= List of aircraft (M–Ma) =

This is a list of aircraft in numerical order of manufacturer followed by alphabetical order beginning with 'M–Ma'.

== M-Squared Aircraft ==
M-Squared Aircraft Inc. St. Elmo, Alabama, United States

- M-Squared Sport 1000
- M-Squared Sprint 1000 FP
- M-Squared Sprint 1000
- M-Squared Sprint 1000 FP
- M-Squared Breese XL
- M-Squared Breese 2 SS
- M-Squared Breese 2 DS
- M-Squared Breese DS
- M-Squared Breese SS
- M-Squared Ultra-X
- M-Squared American Tugz

== M&D ==
(M&D Flugzeugbau, Germany)

- M&D Flugzeugbau JS-MD Single
- M&D Flugzeugbau Samburo

== Ma ==
=== Mabley ===
(J.Mabley, Rexdale, Ontario)

- Mabley White Monoplane

=== MAC ===
(Melbourne Aircraft Corporation)

- MAC Mamba

=== Mac Para Technology ===
(Rožnov pod Radhoštěm, Czech Republic)

- Mac Bitch
- Mac Blaze
- Mac Charger
- Mac Eden
- Mac Elan
- Mac Icon
- Mac Intox
- Mac Magus
- Mac Muse
- Mac Paradox
- Mac Pasha
- Mac Progress
- Mac T-Ride
- Mac Whistler
- Mac Yukon

=== Macair ===
(Macair Industries)

- Macair Merlin

=== Macchi ===
(Giulio Macchi / Nieuport-Macchi / Aeronautica Macchi S.p.A.)

- Nieuport-Macchi N.VI
- Nieuport-Macchi Parasol
- Nieuport-Macchi N.10
- Nieuport-Macchi N.11
- Nieuport-Macchi N.17
- Macchi C.3
- Macchi L.1
- Macchi L.2
- Macchi L.3
- Macchi M.3
- Macchi M.4
- Macchi M.5
- Macchi M.6
- Macchi M.7
- Macchi M.8
- Macchi M.9
- Macchi M.9bis
- Macchi M.12
- Macchi M.12bis
- Macchi M.14
- Macchi M.15
- Macchi M.15bis
- Macchi M.16
- Macchi M.17
- Macchi M.18
- Macchi M.19
- Macchi M.20
- Macchi M.24
- Macchi M.26
- Macchi M.29
- Macchi M.33
- Macchi M.39
- Macchi M.40
- Macchi M.41
- Macchi M.52
- Macchi M.53
- Macchi M.67
- Macchi M.70
- Macchi M.71
- Macchi MC.72
- Macchi MC.73
- Macchi MC.73 Idro
- Macchi MC.77
- Macchi MC.94
- Macchi MC.99
- Macchi MC.100
- Macchi MC.200
- Macchi MC.201
- Macchi MC.202
- Macchi MC.205
- Macchi MC.206
- Macchi MC.207
- Macchi MB.307
- Macchi MB.308
- Macchi MB.320
- Macchi MB.323
- Macchi MB.326
- Macchi M.416
- Macchi-Lockheed AL.60

=== MacCready ===
- Gossamer Condor
- Gossamer Albatross
- Gossamer Owl
- Gossamer Penguin
- MacCready Bionic Bat

=== MacDonald ===
- MacDonald Sportflight A

=== MacDonald ===
((Robert A) MacDonald Aircraft Co, Sonoma, CA)

- MacDonald S-20
- MacDonald S-21

=== Mace-Trefethen ===
(Harvey Mace & Alfred Trefethen, Sacramento, CA)

- Mace-Trefethen M-101 Macerschmitt
- Mace-Trefethen M-102 Scorchy
- Mace-Trefethen R-1 Mr B
- Mace-Trefethen R-2 Shark
- Mace-Trefethen Seamaster

=== Macera ===
(Silvano Macera)

- Macera Sparviero

=== Macfam ===
(Macfam World Traders)

- Macfam SA 102.5 Cavalier
- Macfam SA 103 Cavalier
- Macfam SA 104 Cavalier
- Macfam SA 105 Super Cavalier

=== Mack ===
(Mack-Craft Amphibian Corp Inc (Fdr: R U McIntosh), Plymouth, MI)

- Mack Dolphin

=== MacManaman ===
(James E MacManaman, Springfield, OR)

- MacManaman 1930 Monoplane
- MacManaman Baby Fleet

=== Madison ===
(Madison Airport Company Inc, Madison, WI)

- Madison Super Ace

=== Maeda ===
- Maeda Ku-1
- Maeda Ku-6

=== Maestranza Central de Aviación ===
- Maestranza Central de Aviación Triciclo-Experimental
- Maestranza Central de Aviación XX-01
- Maestranza Central de Aviación HF XX-02

=== MAG ===
(Magyar Altalános Gepgyár RT – MAG – {Ungarische Allgemaine Mascinenfabrik AG})

- MAG-Fokker Triplane 90.01 (Fokker V 6?)
- MAG-Fokker Triplane 90.02 (Fokker V 4)
- MAG-Fokker 90.03 (Fokker V 7)
- MAG-Fokker 90.04 (Fokker V 12)
- MAG-Fokker 90.05 (Fokker V 22)

=== Magal ===
(Magal Holdings Ltd.)

- Magal Cuby I
- Magal Cuby II
- Magal Copy Cub

=== Magni ===
(Laboratorio Costruzioni Aeronautiche Piero Magni / Piero Magni Aviazione S.A.I.)

- Magni Vale
- Magni Supervale
- Magni PM.1 Vittoria
- Magni PM.2
- Magni PM.3

=== Magni ===
(Magni Gyro s.r.l.)

- Magni-Tervamäki MT-5
- Magni-Tervamäki MT-7
- Magni M-14 Scout
- Magni M-16 Tandem Trainer
- Magni M-18 Spartan
- Magni M-22 Voyager
- Magni XM-23 Orion
- Magni M-24 Orion
- Magni M-26
- Magni VPM S-2

=== Magnum ===
(Terrence O'Neill, President OAC, Magnum)

- Magnum Pickup

=== Mahoney ===
(Lee Mahoney)

- Mahoney Sorceress

=== Mahoney-Ryan ===
( B F Mahoney-Ryan Aircraft Co, San Diego, CA)

- Mahoney-Ryan X-1 Special a.k.a. Sportster
- Mahoney-Ryan B-1
- Mahoney-Ryan B-2
- Mahoney-Ryan B-3 Brougham

=== MAI ===
(Moscow Aviation Institute)

- MAI E-2
- MAI E-3
- MAI Boldrev
- MAI Elf
- MAI EMAI
- MAI Foton
- MAI Kvant (Quantum)
- MAI Semburg
- MAI-SKB-3PM
- MAI Junior
- MAI-62
- MAI-89
- OSKBES MAI-208
- Oskbes Aviatika Mai 920 – Oskbes MAI Moskau Aviation Institut
- MAI-223 Kityonok
- MAI-890
- MAI-890U
- Aviatika-MAI-890SKh Farmer
- Aviatika-MAI-890USKh
- Aviatika-MAI-890S
- MAI-900 Acrobat
- OSKBES MAI-920
- MAI-980U
- MAI-980CSH
- MAI Marathon
- MAI-03
- MAI-53
- MAI-56
- MAI-60 Snezhinka
- MAI-63
- MAI-68
- MAI-890
- MAI-920

=== Maillet Nennig ===
- Maillet Nennig MN-A

=== Mainair Sports ===
- Mainair Blade
- Mainair Blade 582
- Mainair Blade 912
- Mainair Rapier

=== Mair ===
(E Mair, 3106 W Fullerton Ave, Chicago, IL)

- Mair 1910 Biplane

=== Makelan ===
(Makelan Corporation, New Braunfels, TX)

- Hatz Bantam
- Hatz CB-1
- Hatz Classic

=== Makhonine ===
(Ivan Makhonine)

- Makhonine Mak-10
- Makhonine Mak-101
- Makhonine Mak-123

=== Makino ===
(T. Makino with Mr Hirano and Mr Oki)

- Makino MHO.235

=== Malcolm ===
(Malcolm Aircraft)

- Malcolm Merlin

=== Malev ===
- Malev ILL-62M

=== Malinowski ===
(Stefan Malinowski)

- Stemal III
- Malinowski Dziaba

=== Man Planes ===
(Man Planes Inc, Manitowoc, WI)

- Man Planes MP-1

=== Manfred Weiss ===
Data from:

- Manfred Weiss Hungária
- Manfred Weiss WM-9 Budapest Foker C.V-E
- Manfred Weiss EM-10 Siemens Sh.12 engine
- Manfred Weiss WM-10 Ölyv (Buzzard/Hawk)
- Manfred Weiss WM-11 Budapest FokKer C.V
- Manfred Weiss WM-13 (WM-10a re-engined with a 130hp Sport III)
- Manfred Weiss WM-14 Budapest Fokker C.V-D
- Manfred Weiss WM-16 Budapest
  - WM-16A with 410 kW (550 hp) Gnome-Rhône 9K Mistral, 9 built
  - WM-16B with 641.3 kW (860 hp) Gnome-Rhône 14K Mistral Major, 9 built
- Manfred Weiss WM-17 – [Project] single-seat fighter aircraft
- Manfred Weiss WM-18 – [Project] single-seat fighter aircraft
- Manfred Weiss WM-20 Heinkel HD.22 deriv.
- Manfred Weiss WM-21 Sólyom development of WM-16
- Manfred Weiss WM-23 Ezüst Nyíl – prototype, 1 built, crashed on 21 April 1942 during a test flight after losing an aileron
  - WM-23B – [Project], 2-seater reconnaissance*** WM-23 with rear defence.
  - WM-23G – [Project], Gyakorlo (Advanced Trainer) based on WM-23 fighter
- Manfred Weiss WM-24 – [Project] possible desig. for Daimler- Benz DB603-powered WM-23/WM-123 fighter
- Manfred Weiss WM-123 Ezüst Nyíl II – [Project] alt desig for DB603-powered WM-23 fighter

=== Mangin ===
(Guy Mangin)

- Mangin MRC.1

=== Manhattan ===
(Manhattan Aeroplane Co, consortium of former Brooklyn Aero Club members, New York, NY)

- Manhattan 1913 Biplane

=== Manko / Man-pi ===
(Manshu Koku KK / Manshu Hikoki Seizo KK – Manchurian Airways Co. Ltd / Manchurian Aeroplane Manufacturing Co. Ltd.)

- Manko MT-1 Hayabusa Passenger Transport
- Manko MT-2 Light Passenger Transport

=== Manley-Stewart ===
(B B Stewart & F E Manley, Salem, OR)

- Manley-Stewart H-200

=== Mann Egerton ===
- Mann Egerton Type B
- Mann Egerton Type H

=== Mann & Grimmer ===
- Mann & Grimmer M.1

=== Manorplane ===
(Florian F Manor, Fon du Lac, WI)

- Manorplane T-1

=== Mannesmann ===
- Mannesmann Giant Triplane

=== Mansyū ===
- Mansyū Ki-79
- Mansyū Army Type 2 Advanced Trainer
- Mansyū Ki-98

=== Manta ===
(Manta Aircraft Corp (John P & David R Davis), 540 N LaBrea Ave, Los Angeles, CA)

- Manta 1940 Monoplane
- Manta long-range fighter

=== Manta ===
(Manta Products Inc)

- Manta Foxbat

=== Mantelli ===
- Mantelli AM-6
- Mantelli AM-8
- Mantelli AM-9
- Mantelli AM-10 Triete
- Mantelli AM-11 Albatros
- Mantelli AM-12

=== Mantz ===
(United Air Services (Paul Mantz), Burbank, CA)

- Mantz 1938 Pusher
- Mantz 1950 Pusher

=== Manzolini ===
(Conte Ettore Manzolini di Campoleone)

- Manzolini Libellula

=== Marais ===
(Charles Marais)

- Marais Avionette

=== Maranda ===
(Maranda Aircraft Company)

- Maranda BM1 Loisir
- Maranda BM1-A Super Loisir
- Maranda BM3
- Maranda BM4 Hawk
- Maranda BM5

=== Marawing ===
(Kolin, Czech Republic)

- Marawing 1-L Malamut

=== Marbella Parapente ===
(Málaga, Spain)

- Marbella Parapente Paramotor PAP

=== Marchaudon ===
- Marchaudon Scarabee 01

=== Marchetti ===
(Ing. Alessandro Marchetti)

- Marchetti La Chimera sport biplane of 1910

=== Marchetti-Vickers-Terni ===
- M.V.T. Scout (SIAI S.50)

=== Marchetti ===
((Paul) Marchetti Motor Patents Inc, Mills Field, San Bruno, CA)

- Marchetti M-1
- Marchetti M-2 Arrow

=== Marchetti ===
(Emerino Marchetti, Tuckahoe NY )

- Marchetti Sport

=== Marchetti ===
(Frank Marchetti, Chicago)

- Marchetti Avenger

=== Marcotte ===
(Kenneth Marcotte, Bedford Park, IL)

- Marcotte Rich Mixture II

=== Marcoux-Bromberg ===
(Hal W Marcoux-Jack Bromberg, Venice, CA.)

- Marcoux-Bromberg 1938 Monoplane a.k.a. Elmendorf Special
- Marcoux-Bromberg Special

=== Marenco Swiss helicopter ===
- Marenco SwissHelicopter SKYe SH09

=== Marendez ===
(Marendaz Aircraft Ltd / D. M. K. Marendaz)

- Wickner-Marendaz Mk I
- Marendaz Mk III
- Marendaz Mk IV
- Marendaz Trainer

=== Margański ===
(Edward Margański)

- Margański EM-5A Dudus Kudlacz

=== Margański & Mysłowski ===
(Margański & Mysłowski Zakłady Lotnicze – Margański & Mysłowski Aviation Works)

- EM-10 Bielik
- EM-11 Orka
- MDM MDM-1 Fox
- Swift S-1

=== Marie ===
(Jean-Pierre Marie)

- Marie JPM.01 Médoc

=== Marinac ===
(J G Marinac)

- Marinac Flying Mercury

=== Marinavia ===
( Marinavia Farina SRL)

- Marinavia QR-2
- Marinavia QR-2bis
- Marinavia QR.14 Levriero
- Marinavia QR-22

=== Marine ===
(Marine Aircraft Co, Sausalito, CA)

- Marine Water Sprite

=== Marine Corps Warfighting Laboratory ===
- Dragon Eye

=== Marinens Flyvebaatfabrikk ===
- Marinens Flyvebaatfabrikk M.F.1
- Marinens Flyvebaatfabrikk M.F.2
- Marinens Flyvebaatfabrikk M.F.3
- Marinens Flyvebaatfabrikk M.F.4
- Marinens Flyvebaatfabrikk M.F.5
- Marinens Flyvebaatfabrikk M.F.6
- Marinens Flyvebaatfabrikk M.F.7
- Marinens Flyvebaatfabrikk M.F.8
- Marinens Flyvebaatfabrikk M.F.9
- Marinens Flyvebaatfabrikk M.F.10
- Marinens Flyvebaatfabrikk M.F.11
- Marinens Flyvebaatfabrikk M.F.12
- Marinens Flyvebaatfabrikk W.33

=== Mariner Aircraft ===
- Mariner Aircraft Mariner

=== Marinosyan ===
(Alexander Marinosyan)

- Marinosyan M-235

=== Marion ===
(George Whysall & Assoc a.k.a. Marion Aircraft Co, 280 N Main, Marion, OH)

- Marion 1929 Monoplane
- Marion Whysall

=== Mark ===
(Mark Flugzeugbau)

- Mark Shark

=== Märkische ===
(Märkische Flugzeug-Werke)

- Märkische D.I

=== Markwalder ===
( Ing. A. Markwalder of Räterschen, Switzerland)

- Markwalder Marabu

=== Marlman ===
(William Marland, CO)

- Marlman Flying Girder

=== Marquardt ===
(Marquardt Aircraft Co, Venice and Van Nuys, CA)

- Marquardt M-14 a.k.a. Whirlajet

=== Marquart ===
(Edward Marquart, Riverside, CA)

- Marquart MA-3 Maverick
- Marquart MA-4 Lancer
- Marquart MA-5 Charger

=== Marquian ===
(Roger Marquian)

- Marquian RM.01

=== Marrone ===
(Vincent Marrone, Roosevelt, NY)

- Marrone VM-1

=== Mars ===
(James C "Bud" Mars)

- Mars Skylark

=== Mars ===
(Mars Mfg Co, LeMars, IA)

- Mars M-1-80 Skycoupe

=== Marsh ===
(Marsh Aviation Co, Mesa, AZ)

- Marsh G-164 C-T Turbo Cat
- Marsh S2R-T Turbo Thrush
- Marsh TS-2E Turbo-Tracker
- Marsh Turbo Mentor

=== Marsh ===
(Marsh Aircraft Co, Oak Park, IL)

- Marsh 1930 Monoplane

=== Marshall ===
(Marshall Aircraft Co )

- Marshall E-1

=== Marshall ===
(Marshall Aircraft Laboratories (Nicholas-Beazley employees' group), Marshall, MO)

- Marshall Phantom

=== Marshalls ===
(Marshall Aerospace / Marshalls of Cambridge)

- Marshalls MA.4

=== Marston & Ordway ===
(C J Marston & P W Ordway, Concord, NH)

- Marston & Ordway 1930 Biplane

=== Martens ===
(Arthur Martens)

- Martens Windhund

=== Martin ===
(Glenn L. Martin Company, Santa Ana, CA)

- Martin 57 MO
- Martin 60 M2O
- Martin 63 MS
- Martin 64 monoplane glider project
- Martin 66 XNBL-2, night mailplane
- Martin 67 N2M
- Martin 68 Liberty mail plane, Postal Air Service
- Martin 69 SC
- Martin 70 Commercial, mailplanes converted from XNBL-2
- Martin 71 XO-4
- Martin 72 Liberty mailplane project
- Martin 73 T3M
- Martin 74 T4M
- Martin 75 XLB-4
- Martin 76 Army biplane bomber project
- Martin 77 BM
- Martin 79 twin-engine airliner project
- Martin 80 USN trainer project
- Martin 81 Army high-speed bomber project
- Martin 83 XO2M
- Martin 84 commercial flying boat project
- Martin 85 XO-27
- Martin 115 2 passenger touring plane with open cockpit
- Martin 116 2 passenger sport coupe aircraft
- Martin 117 PM-1
- Martin 118 XT6M
- Martin 119 XP2M
- Martin 120 P3M
- Martin 121 PM-2
- Martin 122 PM
- Martin 123 XB-907/XB-10
- Martin 124 Army general-purpose bomber
- Martin 125 BM-1
- Martin 126 sesquiplane patrol flying boat
- Martin 127 XFM-1
- Martin 128 passenger flying boat with four diesel engines
- Martin 129 BM-2
- Martin 130 M-130, passenger flying boat
- Martin 131 USAAC sea observation aircraft
- Martin 132 B2M-1
- Martin 133 12-passenger airliner
- Martin 134 twin-engine commercial flying boat (P3M-2 type)
- Martin 135 USN bomber/scout aircraft (BM type)
- Martin 136 USN long-range patrol flying boat
- Martin 137 Army ground attack aircraft
- Martin 138 USN amphibian scout aircraft
- Martin 139 B-10B, YB-13, A-15, YO-45
- Martin 139A YB-10, YB-10A
- Martin 139B YB-12, YB-12A, XB-14
- Martin 139W export version of B-10
- Martin 140 Army bomber
- Martin 141 USN flying boat
- Martin 142 USN catamaran flying boat
- Martin 143 20-passenger Pan Am "Streamliner"
- Martin 144 USN torpedo bomber
- Martin 145A XB-16, four-engine version; USAAC "Project A" competitor
- Martin 145B XB-16, six-engine version
- Martin 146 high-speed bomber demonstrator developed from the B-10
- Martin 147 USN monoplane flying boat
- Martin 148 Pan Am monoplane flying boat
- Martin 149 export bomber
- Martin 150 40 passenger "Streamliner" commercial flying boat
- Martin 151 twin-engine long-range bomber
- Martin 152 commercial flying boat, 63000 lb for Pan Am
- Martin 153 transatlantic commercial flying boat, 100000 lb for Pan Am
- Martin 154 54000 lb flying boat for Pan Am
- Martin 155 55000 lb flying boat for Pan Am
- Martin 156 "Russian Clipper", passenger flying boat developed from the M-130
- Martin 157 four-engine ocean transport
- Martin 158 land-based transport for TWA, 70000 lb
- Martin 159 USN observation scout biplane; Martin's last biplane design
- Martin 160A USN four-engine long-range patrol flying boat
- Martin 160B USN long-range patrol boat; became the M-170
- Martin 161 Army high-speed, twin-engine bomber
- Martin 162 PBM-1, XPBM-2
- Martin 162A "Tadpole Clipper", 3/8 scale flying boat to test water takeoffs and landings
- Martin 162B PBM-3, XPBM-3E, PBM-3R
- Martin 162C PBM-3C, XPBM-3D, XPBM-3S
- Martin 162D PBM-3D
- Martin 162E PBM-4
- Martin 162F PBM-5
- Martin 162G PBM-5A
- Martin 162Com twin-engine transatlantic transport
- Martin 162W twin-engine 45000 lb Navy patrol bomber
- Martin 163 four-engine long-range commercial ocean transport
- Martin 164 four-engine, 27500 lb bomber
- Martin 165 twin-engine bomber
- Martin 166 export version of B-10/B-12 for the Netherlands
- Martin 167: X-22, experimental twin-engine attack bomber; competitor to the Douglas DB-7 and Stearman X-100
- Martin 167F/167B Maryland
- Martin 168 USN high-speed, single seat fighter, class VF
- Martin 169 twin-engine heavy attack bomber
- Martin 170 XPB2M-1, XPB2M-1R; former M-160B
- Martin 170A JRM Mars
- Martin 170B JRM-2, JRM-3
- Martin 170C 165000 lb four-engine commercial flying boat
- Martin 171 long-range, high-speed patrol bomber, class VPB
- Martin 172 export bomber
- Martin 173A 24 passenger airliner
- Martin 173B 27 passenger airliner
- Martin 173C twin-engine high-speed Army bomber
- Martin 174 Army attack bomber
- Martin 175 Army attack bomber
- Martin 176 Army attack bomber; resembled a Maryland but with blended wings
- Martin 177 lightweight twin-engine attack proposal
- Martin 178 twin-engine bomber with blended wings
- Martin 179 B-26 Marauder
- Martin 179A B-26A, Marauder Mk. I
- Martin 179B B-26B, AT-23A, Marauder Mk. IA
- Martin 179C B-26C, AT-23B, JM-1, Marauder Mk. II
- Martin 179D XB-26D
- Martin 179E B-26E
- Martin 179F B-26F, Marauder Mk. III
- Martin 179G B-26G, TB-26G
- Martin 180 USN twin-engine, long-range patrol bomber
- Martin 181 USN twin-engine, long-range patrol bomber
- Martin 182 XB-27; medium bomber to USAAC specification XC-214
- Martin 183 twin-engine long-range patrol bomber, class VPB
- Martin 183D medium-range patrol bomber, class VPB
- Martin 184 USN patrol utility (one or two engines), class VPJ
- Martin 185 USN patrol utility (one or two engines), class VPJ
- Martin 186 USN amphibian patrol utility (one or two engines), class VPJ
- Martin 187 twin-engine light bomber for USAAC, derived from the M-167
- Martin 187-B Baltimore
- Martin 187-F 187-B for France
- Martin 187-H 187-B for Holland
- Martin 188 M-186 for export
- Martin 189 XB-33, twin-engine
- Martin 190 XB-33A, four-engine
- Martin 191 twin-engine bomber
- Martin 192 twin-engine torpedo bomber
- Martin 193 large cargo transport seaplane (modified JRM)
- Martin 194 "Lone Ranger", four-engine heavy bomber
- Martin 195 twin-engine, high-speed medium bomber
- Martin 196 twin-engine, multipurpose medium bomber
- Martin 197 twin-engine medium bomber
- Martin 198 twin-engine, high-speed patrol bomber
- Martin 199 145000 lb cargo land transport (modified JRM)
- Martin 200 100000 lb four-engine airliner
- Martin 201 twin-engine, high-speed bomber
- Martin 202 2-0-2 "Martinliner", airliner
- Martin 202-7 military version of 2-0-2
- Martin 202-12 Mercury, 30 passenger variant of 2-0-2
- Martin 203 "Tokyo Express", four-engine transport (later heavy bomber)
- Martin 204 high-performance, low-altitude bomber
- Martin 205 "Flying Wing"; Martin-built B-35 flying wing bomber (cancelled)
- Martin 206 USN twin-engine patrol bomber
- Martin 207 twin-engine fighter
- Martin 208 PBB-1 Ranger twin-engine patrol bomber (cancelled)
- Martin 209 four-engine, long-range bomber
- Martin 210 AM Mauler
- Martin 210A AM-1
- Martin 210B AM-1Q
- Martin 210 XAM-2
- Martin 210 Mercury JR2M-1 carrier onboard delivery (COD) version of the Mauler
- Martin 211 USN land-based patrol aircraft
- Martin 212 twin-engine, long-range patrol boat
- Martin 213 light transport
- Martin 214 six-engine, long-range airliner
- Martin 215 twin-engine refrigerated cargo transport
- Martin 216 eight-engine, 500000 lb flying aircraft carrier
- Martin 217 flying-wing fighter
- Martin 218 twin jet, high-altitude fighter
- Martin 219 P4M Mercator
- Martin 220 four-engine/twin jet USN patrol bomber
- Martin 221 twin-engine, 15000 lb aircraft
- Martin 222 twin-engine land transport
- Martin 223 XB-48
- Martin 224 twin-engine military transport (modified 2-0-2)
- Martin 225 four-engine long-range patrol bomber
- Martin 226 four-engine patrol bomber
- Martin 227 high-performance jet dive bomber, USN
- Martin 228 twin-engine, 26 passenger airliner; 2-0-2 derivative
- Martin 229 four-engine 150000 lb transport (modified JRM)
- Martin 230 four-engine patrol boat
- Martin 231 four-engine patrol land plane
- Martin 232 twin-engine, carrier-based bomber
- Martin 234 XB-51
- Martin 235 high-performance USN fighter
- Martin 236 USAF heavy bomber (B-52 competition)
- Martin 237 P5M Marlin
- Martin 238 ASW aircraft, USN
- Martin 239 trijet Army low-level attack aircraft (modified XB-51)
- Martin 240 four-engine heavy cargo/troop transport
- Martin 241 twin-engine cargo transport
- Martin 242 assault transport seaplane
- Martin 243 four-engine medium jet bomber
- Martin 244 two-place basic trainer, Army
- Martin 245 two-place long-range special attack monoplane
- Martin 246 carrier-based jet bomber (A2F/A-6 competition)
- Martin 247 turboprop version of XB-48 for XB-55 competition
- Martin 251 high-performance four-engine jet bomber
- Martin 254 ASW seaplane, USN
- Martin 255 CVE-105 class carrier-based ASW aircraft (S2F/S-2 Tracker competition)
- Martin 259 sea-based version of XB-51
- Martin 261 twinjet land-based minelayer aircraft, USN
- Martin 262 single turboprop VTOL convoy fighter (XFY-1/XFV-1 competitor)
- Martin 263 ground support attack aircraft, USAF
- Martin 265 flying infantry ship, USAF
- Martin 267 P5M modified to ASW patrol seaplane
- Martin 268 twin-engine trainer, USAF
- Martin 269 medium bomber, USAF
- Martin 270 XP5M-1
- Martin 271 P5M-2, uprated P5M-1; cancelled
- Martin 272 B-57
- Martin 274 P5M-1
- Martin 275 P6M SeaMaster
- Martin 276 fighter-bomber, USAF
- Martin 278 swept-wing fighter-bomber, USAF
- Martin 279 high-performance land-based minelayer, USN
- Martin 280 land-based ASW aircraft, USN
- Martin 281 short-range bomber/reconnaissance, USAF
- Martin 282 advanced night intruder, USAF
- Martin 283 carrier-based attack aircraft, USN
- Martin 284 ZELMAL (Zero Launch Mat Landing), carrier-based
- Martin 286 Strategic Air Command bomber, USAF (WS-110 competitor)
- Martin 287 ZELMAL (F-84G), USAF
- Martin 288 fighter-bomber, USAF
- Martin 289 night intruder, USAF
- Martin 290 P5M-3, BLC version of P5M; redesignated P7M SubMaster
- Martin 291 ASW aircraft, USN
- Martin 294 reconnaissance version of B-57B
- Martin 297 P5M-Y, sea-based ASW intrusion patrol aircraft, USN
- Martin 298 P5M-X, modified P5M-2 to ASW role, USN
- Martin 299 lightweight fighter
- Martin 302 long-range interceptor, USAF
- Martin 303 3-0-3, prototype airliner; improved version of 2-0-2
- Martin 304 cargo version of 3-0-3
- Martin 305 unsupercharged version of 3-0-3
- Martin 306 twinjet (GE TG-180) version of 3-0-3
- Martin 307 SeaMistress; enlarged version of P6M
- Martin 308 long-range interceptor, USAF (first alternative for M-302)
- Martin 313
- Martin 314 long-range interceptor, USAF (second alternative for M-302)
- Martin 315 fighter-bomber (unconventional takeoff), USAF
- Martin 316 XB-68, supersonic Tactical Air Command (TAC) medium tactical bomber
- Martin 317 refueling tanker version of P6M, USN
- Martin 318 extended-range counter-surveillance (ERCS) version of P6M, USN
- Martin 319 TAC interceptor-bomber, USAF
- Martin 321 air/sea rescue version of P5M
- Martin 326 utility target-towing version of B-57
- Martin 327 Titan ICBM
- Martin 328 fighter-bomber, USAF
- Martin 329 four jet engine, supersonic patrol flying boat
- Martin 331 ASP (Advanced Seaplane), nuclear-powered derivative of P6M
- Martin 333 cargo transport, USAF
- Martin 337 seaplane water base study, USAF
- Martin 343 cargo transport, Army
- Martin 344 long-range interceptor
- Martin 345 attack aircraft, USN
- Martin 346 attack aircraft, USN
- Martin 347 land-based ASW aircraft, USN
- Martin 350 SAC bomber, USAF
- Martin 351 TAC bomber, USAF
- Martin 354 short-range hovering aircraft, Army
- Martin 358 supersonic attack bomber (similar to M-329), USN
- Martin 363 four-ton payload STOL transport, Army
- Martin 365 rotoprop aircraft, Army
- Martin 367 ASW seaplane, USN
- Martin 371 STOL cargo transport, Army
- Martin 377 nuclear-powered ASW seaplane study
- Martin 380 advanced VTOL studies
- Martin 382 electronic countermeasures (ECM) trainer
- Martin 404 4-0-4, airliner
- Martin A-15
- Martin A-22 Maryland
- Martin A-23 Baltimore
- Martin A-30 Baltimore
- Martin A-45
- Martin AT-23
- Martin B-10
- Martin B-12
- Martin B-13
- Martin B-14
- Martin B-16
- Martin B-26 Marauder
- Martin B-27
- Martin B-33 Super Marauder
- Martin B-48
- Martin B-51
- Martin B-57 Canberra
- Martin B-68
- Martin XB-907
- Martin C-3
- Martin XLB-4
- Martin XO-4
- Martin X-23 PRIME
- Martin P-5 Marlin
- Martin AM Mauler
- Martin BM
- Martin BTM
- Martin T-1
- Martin JM
- Martin JRM Mars
- Martin M12P
- Martin MO
- Martin M2O
- Martin MS
- Martin NBS-1
- Martin N2M
- Martin PM
- Martin P2M
- Martin P3M
- Martin P4M Mercator
- Martin P5M Marlin
- Martin P6M SeaMaster
- Martin P7M SubMaster
- Martin PBM Mariner
- Martin PB2M Mars
- Martin RM
- Martin SC
- Martin T2M
- Martin T3M
- Martin T4M
- Martin T5M
- Martin No.1 1909 Biplane
- Martin 1909-1910 Monoplane
- Martin 1911 Biplane
- Martin 1912 Landplane
- Martin 1912 Tractor1
- Martin 1913 Hydroaeroplane
- Martin 1913 Pusher
- Martin 1913 Special
- Martin-Willard 1914 Biplane
- Martin 2-0-2
- Martin 3-0-3
- Martin 4-0-4
- Martin Aerial Freighter
- Martin Baltimore
- Martin GMB
- Martin GMC
- Martin GMP
- Martin GMT
- Martin Great lakes Tourer
- Martin K-3 Scout
- Martin Maryland
- Martin MB-1
- Martin MB-2
- Martin MBT
- Martin MT
- Martin R
- Martin R-Land
- Martin S Hydro
- Martin T
- Martin TT
- Glenn Martin Twin Tractor

=== Martin ===
(Martin Aircraft Company, Christchurch, New Zealand)

- Martin Jetpack

=== Martin ===
(James Vernon, Martin Aeroplane Co, Elyra, OH)

- Martin Bomber
- Martin Harvard I
- Martin K-III Kitten a.k.a. Blue Bird
- Martin K-IV
- Martin KF-1

=== Martin ===
(Arthur Martin, Santa Ana, CA)

- Martin Dart

=== Martin ===
()

- Martin Paraplane
- Martin Roadstar

=== Martin ===
(Ray Martin, Smithville, OH)

- Martin 1957 Monoplane

=== Martin-Boyd ===
(Edward Martin & Millard Boyd, Santa Ana, CA)

- Martin-Boyd 1927 Monoplane

=== Martin-Baker ===
- Martin-Baker MB 1
- Martin-Baker MB 2
- Martin-Baker MB 3
- Martin-Baker MB 4
- Martin-Baker MB 5

=== Martin-Marietta ===
- Martin-Marietta X-23 PRIME
- Martin-Marietta X-24
- Martin-Marietta X-24A PILOT
- Martin-Marietta X-24B
- Martin-Marietta X-24C
- Martin-Marietta SV-5J
- Martin-Marietta SV-5P

=== Martinsyde ===
- Martin-Handasyde No. 3
- Martin-Handasyde No.4B Dragonfly
- Martinsyde A1
- Martinsyde F1
- Martinsyde F2
- Martinsyde F3
- Martinsyde F.4 Buzzard
- Martinsyde F6
- Martinsyde Elephant
- Martinsyde G102
- Martinsyde G100
- Martinsyde S1
- Martinsyde Semiquaver
- Martinsyde Raymor

=== Maruoka ===
(Katsura Maruoka)

- Maruoka Man-Powered Screw-Wing Machine (Human powered helicopter)

=== Maschelin ===
- Maschelin M58 Masquito

=== Maslov ===
(E. Maslov)

- Маslov Accord

=== Mason ===
(Joe J Mason, Woodland Hills, CA)

- Mason DH-2 4/5 replica

=== Mason ===
(Monty G Mason, Long Beach, CA)

- Mason Greater Meteor
- Mason Meteor M

=== Mason ===
(Dave Mason, Houston, TX)

- Mason DM-1 Skyblazer

=== Mason ===
(Dave Mason, Houston, TX)

- Mason DM-1 Skyblazer

=== Masquito ===
(Masquito Aircraft)

- Masquito M58
- Masquito M80

=== Master ===
(Master Aircraft, 315 Passaic St, Rochelle Park, NJ)

- Master Greyhound

=== Mathews ===
(Lyle Mathews)

- Mathews Mr Easy
- Mathews Petit Breezy
- Mathews PUP
- Mathews Turnerkraft

=== Mathewson ===
(Mathewson Automobile Co, Denver, CO)

- Mathewson#1
- Mathewson#2
- Mathewson#3
- Mathewson#4
- Mathewson#5
- Mathewson#6

=== MATRA ===
(Mécanique Aviation TRAction)

- MATRA-Cantinieau Bamby
- MATRA-Cantinieau MC-101
- MATRA-Cantinieau Faon
- MATRA R.75
- MATRA R.100
- MATRA R.110
- MATRA 360.4 Jupiter
- MATRA 360.6 Jupiter

=== Matthews ===
(Clark B Matthews, 317 Second St Marietta, OH)

- Matthews 2-B a.k.a. CBM Special

=== Matthieu-Russel ===
((---) Mathieu-Charles Russel, Chicago, IL)

- Matthieu-Russel 1929 Monoplane

=== Mattioni ===
- Mattioni Botte Volante (Flying barrel) second version

=== Mattley ===
((Henry) Mattley Airplane & Motor Co, San Bruno, CA)

- Mattley FP-1 a.k.a. Fliver #1

=== Mauboussin ===
(Pierre Mauboussin / Avions Mauboussin)

- Mauboussin H.10
- Mauboussin M.10
- Mauboussin M.10bis floatplane
- Mauboussin M.40 Hémiptère
- Mauboussin M.110 'Peyret-Mauboussin PM 110'
- Mauboussin M.111 Peyret-Mauboussin PM XI/M.11 design
- Mauboussin M.112
- Mauboussin M.120 Corsaire
- Mauboussin M.120/32
- Mauboussin M.120/34
- Mauboussin M.120/37 (Project)
- Mauboussin M.121 Corsaire Major
- Mauboussin M.122 Corsaire Major
- Mauboussin M.123 Corsaire
- Mauboussin M.123C
- Mauboussin M.123M (Project)
- Mauboussin M.123R (Project)
- Mauboussin M.123T (Project)
- Mauboussin M.124
- Mauboussin M.125
- Mauboussin M.126
- Mauboussin M.127
- Mauboussin M.128
- Mauboussin M.129
- Mauboussin M.129/48
- Mauboussin M.130 (Project)
- Mauboussin M.160 (Project)
- Mauboussin M.190 (Project)
- Mauboussin MH.190 (Project)
- Mauboussin M.200
- Mauboussin M.201
- Mauboussin M.202
- Mauboussin M.260 (Project)
- Mauboussin FM.260
- Mauboussin M.300
- Mauboussin M.400
- Mauboussin-Zodiac 17

=== Maule ===
(Maule Aircraft Corp.)

- Maule 1931 aeroplane
- Maule M-1 Mid-wing
- Maule M-2 Ornithopter
- Maule M-3 Ornithopter
- Maule M-4
- Maule M-5 Lunar Rocket
- Maule M-6 Super Rocket
- Maule M-7 Super Rocket / Orion / Comet / Star rocket
- Maule M-8
- Maule M-9
- Maule MT-7
- Maule MX-7
- Maule MXT-7
- Maule Bee Dee M-4

=== Maurice Farman ===
- See : Farman Aviation Works

=== Mauro ===
(Larry Mauro)

- Mauro Solar Riser

=== MÁVAG ===
(Magyar Királyi Állami Vas-, Acél- és Gépgyárak – Royal Hungarian State Iron, Steel and Machine Works)

- MÁVAG Héja

=== Maverick ===
(Maverick Air Inc, Penrose, CO)

- Maverick 1200 TwinJet
- Maverick 1500 TwinJet
- Maverick CruiserJet
- Maverick SmartJet

=== Max Holste ===
(Avions Max Holste)

- Max Holste MH.20
- Max Holste MH.52
- Max Holste MH.53 Cadet
- Max Holste M.H.152
- Max Holste MH.1521 Broussard
- Max Holste MH.1522 Broussard
- Max Holste M.H.153
- Max Holste MH.250 Super Broussard
- Max Holste MH.260 Super Broussard

=== Max Plan ===
- Max Plan PF.204 Busard
- Max Plan PF.205 Busard
- Max Plan PF.207
- Max Plan PF.214
- Max Plan PF.215

=== Maximum Safety ===
(Maximum Safety Airplane Co (Fdr: Fred L Bronson), 5111 Santa Fe Ave, Los Angeles, CA)

- Maximum Safety M-1
- Maximum Safety M-2
- Maximum Safety M-3
- Maximum Safety M-4L

=== Maxson ===
(W L Maxson Corp. / Maxson-Brewster.)

- Maxson NR

=== Mayberry ===
(Oakland CA.)

- Mayberry T-1

=== Mayer ===
(Robert Mayer)

- Mayer 1951 Monoplane

=== Mayo ===
((William Benson) Mayo Radiator Co, New Haven, CT)

- Mayo 1914 Biplane
- Mayo 1916 Biplane
- Mayo Type A

=== Mayo-Vought-Simplex ===
(Simplex Automobile Co, New Brunswick, NJ)

- Simplex 1914 Biplane

=== Mazel ===
- Mazel Acrolaram
