= JPM 03 Loiret =

French homebuilt aircraft

General information
- Type: Amateur-built aircraft
- National origin: France
- Manufacturer: Avions Jean-Pierre Marie (JPM)
- Designer: Jean-Pierre Marie
- Status: Plans available (2015)

History
- Developed from: JPM 01 Médoc

The JPM 03 Loiret is a French amateur-built aircraft that was designed by Jean-Pierre Marie and produced by Avions Jean-Pierre Marie (JPM) of Le Mesnil-Esnard. The aircraft is a development of the JPM 01 Médoc and is supplied as plans for amateur construction.

The aircraft is named for the French community of Loiret.

== Design and development ==
The Loiret features a cantilever low wing, a two-seats-in-side-by-side configuration enclosed cockpit under a bubble canopy, fixed tricycle landing gear with wheel pants and a single engine in tractor configuration.

The aircraft is made from wood with its flying surfaces covered in doped aircraft fabric. Its 7.72 m (25.3 ft) span wing has an area of 8.49 m^{2} (91.4 sq ft) and mounts flaps. The Loiret was designed specifically to use only the 85 hp (63 kW) Jabiru 2200 four-stroke powerplant.

The aircraft can be built with a single-piece wing or a three-piece folding wing. With the wings folded the resulting width is 2.36 m (7.7 ft), permitting ground transport or storage.

== Specifications (JPM 03 Loiret) ==
Data from Bayerl, Tacke and JPM

General characteristics

- Crew: one
- Capacity: one passenger
- Length: 7 m (23 ft 0 in)
- Wingspan: 7.72 m (25 ft 4 in)
- Wing area: 8.49 m^{2} (91.4 sq ft)
- Empty weight: 250 kg (551 lb)
- Gross weight: 450 kg (992 lb)
- Fuel capacity: 60 litres (13 imp gal; 16 US gal)
- Powerplant: 1 × Jabiru 2200 four cylinder, air-cooled, four stroke aircraft engine, 60 kW (80 hp)
- Propellers: 2-bladed wooden

Performance

- Maximum speed: 221 km/h (137 mph, 119 kn)
- Cruise speed: 198 km/h (123 mph, 107 kn)
- Stall speed: 64 km/h (40 mph, 35 kn)
- Never exceed speed: 275 km/h (171 mph, 148 kn)with no reserve
- Endurance: 3 hours, plus 50 minute reserve
- Service ceiling: 4,500 m (14,800 ft)
- g limits: +3.5/–1.5
- Rate of climb: 5 m/s (980 ft/min)
- Rate of sink: 2.5 m/s (490 ft/min) at 90 km/h (55.9 mph)
- Wing loading: 53.0 kg/m^{2} (10.9 lb/sq ft)
