= B68 =

B68 or B-68 may refer to:

- Barnard 68, a molecular cloud and likely star-formation site
- B68 (New York City bus) in Brooklyn
- B68 Toftir, a Faroese football club
- Sicilian Defence in the Encyclopaedia of Chess Openings
- Bundesstraße 68, a GErman road
- Martin XB-68 (none built), an experimental American aircraft
- B-68 Titan
