= N2M =

N2M may refer to:

- Martin N2M, a prototype biplane
- N2M, a Canadian post code assigned to Kitchener, Ontario
- n̅2m, a Hermann–Mauguin notation symbol
