= M200 =

M200 may stand for:

- CheyTac Intervention, an American bolt-action sniper rifle manufactured by Randy Kobzeff
- Armscor M200 A revolver manufactured by Armscor in the Philippines
- M-200 (Michigan highway), a state highway that served as a spur route from US 41 into Stephenson in Menominee County
- Saber M200, a Brazilian Radar unit by Saber Radar
- Mauboussin M.200, a French racing monoplane
- CVT M-200, a two-seat glider designed and built in Italy
- Soviet submarine M-200, a short-range, diesel attack submarine of the Soviet Navy
- Volociximab, a.k.a. M200, a chimeric monoclonal antibody
- Canon EOS M200, an mirrorless camera from Canon
- HKL Class M200, a metro train of Helsinki Metro
- DJI Matrice 200, a Chinese industrial drone
