= Avions Jean-Pierre Marie =

French aircraft manufacturer

- Company type: Privately held company
- Industry: Aerospace
- Headquarters: Le Mesnil-Esnard, France
- Key people: Jean-Pierre Marie
- Products: Homebuilt aircraft plans
- Website: avionsjeanpierremarie.fr

Avions Jean-Pierre Marie (English: Jean-Pierre Marie Aircraft), often just referred to as JPM, is a French aircraft manufacturer based in Le Mesnil-Esnard and founded by Jean-Pierre Marie. The company specializes in the design of light aircraft in the form of plans for amateur construction.

The designs focus on simple construction using rectangular wings and the employment of conventional materials such as wood and fabric that can be built without special knowledge or special tools. The early designs were originally intended to be equipped with the Volkswagen air-cooled engine to reduce completion cost.

The company offers a wide range of wood and fabric construction light and ultralight aircraft, including the two-seat JPM 01 Médoc first completed in 1977, the three-seat JPM 02 Anjou, the two-seat JPM 03 Loiret ultralight, the two seat JPM 03-7 Calva, the single-seat JPM 04 Castor ultralight, the 2007 two seats in tandem JPM 05 Trucanou, the JPM 05 Layon tandem ultralight. Future projects under development include the JPM 06 two-seat ultralight and JPM 07 three-seater.

== Aircraft ==
Summary of aircraft built by JPM
Model name	First flight	Number built	Type
JPM 01 Médoc	1977		Two seat wood and fabric homebuilt design
JPM 02 Anjou			Three seat wood and fabric homebuilt design
JPM 03 Loiret			Two seat wood and fabric ultralight design
JPM 03-7 Calva			Two seat wood and fabric homebuilt design
JPM 04 Castor			Single seat wood and fabric ultralight design
JPM 05 Trucanou	2007		Two seat wood and fabric homebuilt design
JPM 05 Layon			Two seat wood and fabric ultralight design
JPM 06			Two seat wood and fabric ultralight design
JPM 07			Three seat wood and fabric homebuilt design
