= Manzolini Libellula =

Libellula

General information
- Type: Light experimental helicopter
- Manufacturer: Manzolini
- Designer: Ettore Manzolini
- Number built: 3

History
- First flight: 7 January 1952

The Manzolini Libellula was a 1950s Italian co-axial twin-rotor helicopter designed by Ettore Manzolini. "Libellula" is the Italian word for "Dragonfly".

== Design and development ==
Ettore Manzolini established a company in Rome, Italy to develop a helicopter he had designed. The design was the Manzolini Libellula an unusual co-axial helicopter. The co-axial arrangement eliminating the need for an anti-torque rotor allowed the helicopter to have a twin fin arrangement. The Libellula (Registered I-MANZ) first flew on 7 January 1952. An improved version was the single-seat Libellula II which went on to gain Italian certification on 15 October 1962. A three-seater version (the Libellula III) was built and a four-seat Libellula IV was planned but Manzolini stopped development in the late 1960s.

== Variants ==
Libellula
Prototype, one built.
Libellula II
Prototype single-seat version powered by a 75kW (101hp) Walter Minor 4-III engine, one built.
Libellula III
Prototype two-seat version powered by a 104kW (140hp) Walter M 332 engine, one built but not flown.
Libellula IV
Proposed four-seat version powered by a 236kW (317shp) Allison 250-CT18 turboshaft, not built.

== Specifications (Libellula II) ==
Data from Jane's All The World's Aircraft 1965–66

General characteristics

- Crew: 1
- Length: 4.85 m (15 ft 11 in)
- Height: 3.06 m (10 ft 0 in)
- Empty weight: 498 kg (1,098 lb)
- Max takeoff weight: 650 kg (1,433 lb)
- Powerplant: 1 × Walter Minor 4-III air-cooled 4-cylinder inline engine, 75 kW (101 hp)
- Main rotor diameter: 2 × 9.00 m (29 ft 6 in)
- Main rotor area: 127.2 m^{2} (1,369 sq ft)

Performance

- Maximum speed: 110 km/h (68 mph, 59 kn)
- Cruise speed: 90 km/h (56 mph, 49 kn) (econ cruise)
- Range: 200 km (120 mi, 110 nmi) max fuel, 10 min reserve
- Service ceiling: 2,900 m (9,500 ft)
- Rate of climb: 4.0 m/s (780 ft/min)
