= Marquart MA-4 Lancer =

MA-4 Lancer

General information
- Type: Homebuilt aircraft
- Designer: Ed Marquart

The Marquart MA-4 Lancer is a single place, homebuilt biplane.

== Design and development ==
The MA-4 is a single engine, single place biplane with conventional landing gear designed by Ed Marquart. The aircraft uses a constant-chord wing.

== Operational history ==
In 1966 pilot Chuck Wickliffe, won first place flying the Clark Dollar Bill Special in the biplane category at the Reno Air Races with a speed of 147 mph (237 km/h).

== Specifications (MA-4 Lancer) ==
Data from Air Trails

General characteristics

- Crew: 1
- Length: 16 ft 4 in (4.98 m)
- Wingspan: 20 ft (6.1 m)
- Wing area: 116 sq ft (10.8 m^{2})
- Empty weight: 650 lb (295 kg)
- Gross weight: 1,000 lb (454 kg)
- Fuel capacity: 16 gal
- Powerplant: 1 × Continental Horizontally opposed piston, 65 hp (48 kW)
- Propellers: 2-bladed

Performance

- Maximum speed: 128 kn (147 mph, 237 km/h)
- Cruise speed: 96 kn (110 mph, 180 km/h)
- Stall speed: 39 kn (45 mph, 72 km/h)
- Range: 300 nmi (350 mi, 560 km)
- Rate of climb: 800 ft/min (4.1 m/s)

== See also ==
Related development

- Marquart MA-5 Charger

Aircraft of comparable role, configuration, and era

- Baby Great Lakes
