= Oskbes Aviatika MAI-920 =

Russian glider

MAI-920

General information
- Type: Glider
- National origin: Russia
- Manufacturer: Oskbes MAI Moskau Aviation Institut
- Status: In production

History
- Manufactured: 1992-present
- First flight: 1992
- Developed from: Oskbes Aviatika MAI 890

The Oskbes Aviatika MAI-920 is a Russian high-wing, cable-braced, single-seat, training glider that was designed and produced by Oskbes MAI Moskau Aviation Institut, first flying in 1992.

== Design and development ==
The MAI-920 was developed from the powered Oskbes Aviatika MAI-890 ultralight, which can also be used to aerotow the MAI-920 glider. The MAI-920 has a 90% parts commonality with the MAI-890. The glider design uses a higher aspect ratio monoplane wing in place of the MAI-890's biplane wing. It is intended to be a simple and robust student solo glider.

The MAI-920 glider is made from aluminium tube and fabric, with the nose cone built from fibreglass. Its 10 m (32.8 ft) span wing is cable-braced from a kingpost. The landing gear is a fixed monowheel gear, with a nose skid or caster and a tail skid.

== Specifications (MAI-920) ==
Data from Bertrand and company website

General characteristics

- Crew: one
- Wingspan: 10.0 m (32 ft 10 in)
- Aspect ratio: 10:1
- Empty weight: 103 kg (227 lb)

Performance

- Stall speed: 50 km/h (31 mph, 27 kn)
- Never exceed speed: 120 km/h (75 mph, 65 kn)
- Maximum glide ratio: 15:1 at 55 km/h (34 mph)

== See also ==
Related lists

- List of gliders
