= Martin MO =

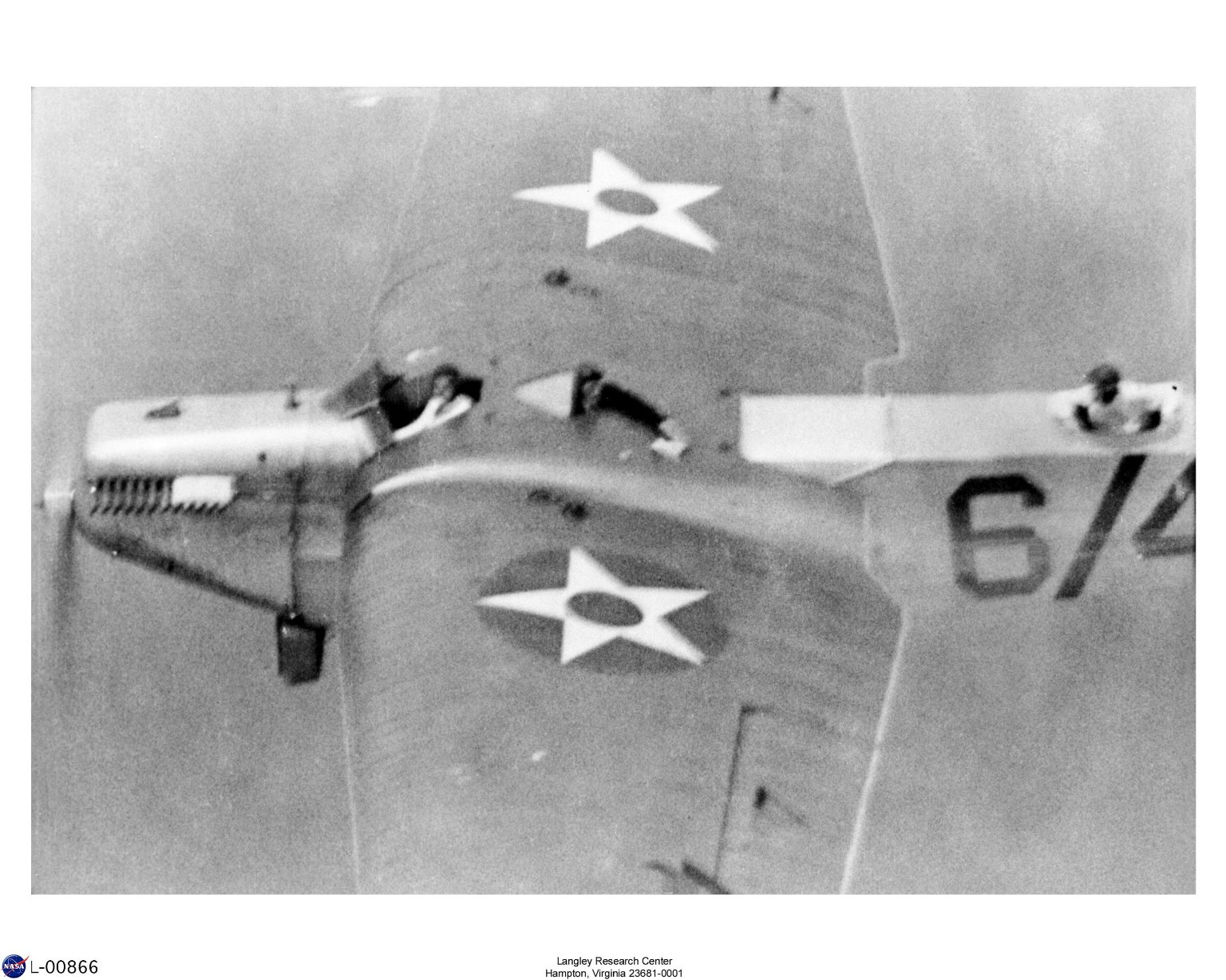
- Martin MO-1 at Langley

General information
- Type: Observation monoplane
- Manufacturer: Martin
- Primary user: United States Navy
- Number built: 36

History
- First flight: December 1922

The Martin MO was an American observation monoplane built by the Glenn L. Martin Company of Cleveland, Ohio for the United States Navy.

In the early 1920s the United States Navy became interested in a thick airfoil section, cantilever wing, United States military observation aircraft, developed by the Dutch company Fokker. The Navy's Bureau of Aeronautics designed a three-seat observation monoplane to use a similar wing. Production of the aircraft, designated the MO-1, was contracted to the Glenn L. Martin Company with an order for 36 aircraft. The MO-1 was a shoulder-wing cantilever monoplane with a slab-sided fuselage and a fixed tailwheel landing gear. It had an all-metal structure with a fabric covering, and was powered by a Curtiss D-12 engine. In 1924 one aircraft was fitted with float landing gear for evaluation.

== Variants ==
MO-1
Production version for the United States Navy, 36 built.

== Operators ==
United States

- United States Navy

== Specifications (MO-1) ==
Data from The Illustrated Encyclopedia of Aircraft (Part Work 1982-1985), 1985, Orbis Publishing, Page 2419

General characteristics

- Crew: three
- Wingspan: 53 ft 1 in (16.18 m)
- Powerplant: 1 × Curtiss D-12 , 435 hp (324 kW)

Performance

- Maximum speed: 105 mph (169 km/h, 91 kn)

Related lists

- List of United States Navy aircraft designations (pre-1962)
