= MAI-223 =

MAI-223 Kityonok
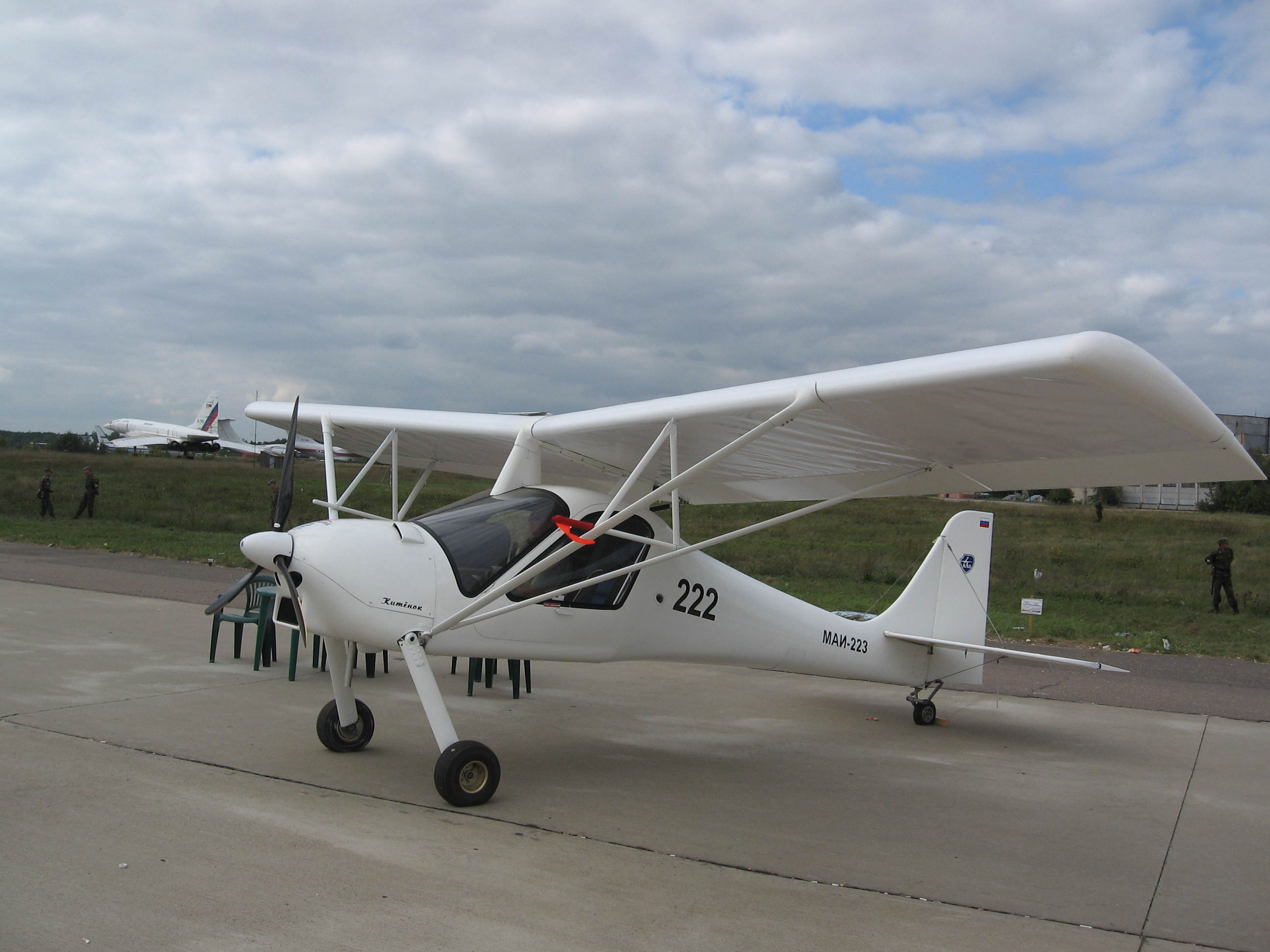
- MAI-223 at the 2007 MAKS Airshow

General information
- Type: Two seat ultralight.
- National origin: Russia
- Manufacturer: OSKBEC MAI
- Number built: 4 by 2009

History
- First flight: 20 October 2004

The MAI-223 Kityonok (Russian: МАИ-223 «Китенок», English: MAI-223 Whale Calf) is a single-engine STOL ultralight aircraft developed by the Moscow Aviation Institute's special design bureau (OSKBEC) from 2002. The first production aircraft was delivered in 2008. A crop spraying version is under development. The aircraft is supplied as a kit for amateur construction or complete and ready-to-fly.

== Design and development ==
The Kityonok is a parasol winged, conventionally laid-out ultralight which seats two side by side. The parasol configuration was used to increase wing lifting area to improve STOL performance. Though the prototype had a partly fabric-covered fuselage, later Kityonoks have glass fibre skins everywhere except for control surfaces. The fuselage has an aluminium frame, and the wings have aluminium alloy ribs. The constant-chord wings are swept forward at about 4°, with 3° of dihedral and mount electrically operated flaps. The wings are braced with a V-form pair of lift struts on each side, fixed to the lower fuselage close to the engine mounting and assisted by jury struts. The centre section loads are carried by a centre-line pair of faired cabane struts. The wings can be folded for storage. The tailplane is trapezoidal and set at the top of the fuselage; there is an electrically operated trim tab on the port elevator. The rudder has a ground-adjustable tab.

The Kityonok is normally powered by a 73.5 kW (98.6 hp) Rotax 912 ULS flat-four engine driving a three-bladed propeller, though the lower-powered Rotax 503UL or 582 UL are options. Access to the cabin is via two deep, glazed doors. The Kityonok has a conventional undercarriage with main wheels on backward-leaning cantilever legs mounted on torsion bars in the lower fuselage. The mainwheels have hydraulic brakes, and the tailwheel casters. Alternatively it can be equipped with skis or floats.

Two production batches of 10 were begun in 2006, on by MAI and one by PRAD. Plans were announced that year for production of the MAI-223SKh crop sprayer version at UZGA (The Ural Works of Civil Aviation) at Ekaterinburg. 4 Kityonoks had been completed by 2009. Though it was intended to produce kits for home building as well as ready-to-fly aircraft, it is not known if any have been made.

== Operational history ==
The third prototype/first production aircraft was delivered to the Tomsk Aero Club in 2008.

== Variants ==
Data from Jane's all the World's Aircraft 2011/12

MAI-223
Base version
MAI-223SKh
Crop sprayer, announced 2006, first flight 31 August 2007. Can carry up to 160 L (42.2 US gal; 35.2 Imp gal) of chemicals distributed via an 8.56 m (28 ft 1 in) spray bar extending beyond the wings.
MAI-208
Autogyro based on MAI-223 fuselage.

== Specifications ==
Data from Jane's All the World's Aircraft 2011/12

General characteristics

- Crew: 2
- Length: 6.00 m (19 ft 8 in)
- Wingspan: 8.19 m (26 ft 10 in)
- Height: 2.10 m (6 ft 11 in)
- Wing area: 11.40 m^{2} (122.7 sq ft) gross
- Airfoil: DFS
- Empty weight: 320 kg (705 lb)
- Max takeoff weight: 495 kg (1,091 lb) UL; 600 kg (1,322 lb JAR VLA)
- Fuel capacity: 70 L (18.5 US gal;15.4 Imp gal)
- Powerplant: 1 × Rotax 912 ULS air- and water-cooled flat-four, 73.5 kW (98.6 hp)
- Propellers: 3-bladed

Performance

- Maximum speed: 190 km/h (120 mph, 100 kn) all performance figures at 610 kg (1,344 lb)
- Cruise speed: 160 km/h (99 mph, 86 kn) economical
- Stall speed: 73 km/h (45 mph, 39 kn) flaps down
- Range: 530 km (330 mi, 290 nmi)
- Service ceiling: 5,500 m (18,000 ft)
- g limits: +2/-4
- Take-off run: 170 m (560 ft)
- Landing run: 120 m (395 ft)

== See also ==
Aircraft of comparable role, configuration, and era

- Ikarus C42
- 3Xtrim 3X55 Trener
- Flight Design CTSW
