= Marbella Parapente =

Spanish aircraft manufacturer

Marbella Parapente SL
- Company type: Privately held company
- Industry: Aerospace
- Founded: before 1998
- Defunct: March 2005
- Headquarters: Málaga, Spain
- Key people: Pierre Aubert
- Products: Paramotors

Marbella Parapente SL (English: Marbella Paragliders) was a Spanish aircraft manufacturer based in Málaga and founded by Pierre Aubert. The company specialized in the design and manufacture of paramotors in the form of ready-to-fly aircraft for the US FAR 103 Ultralight Vehicles rules and the European microlight category.

The company seems to have been founded before 1998 and gone out of business in March 2005.

The company was a Sociedad de Responsabilidad Limitada, a Spanish limited liability company.

Marbella Parapente produced the PAP family of paramotors that were noted for such details as incorporating the reserve parachute within the frame structure.

PAP series paramotors were flown to first-place finishes in the world championships in 2001, 2002, 2003 and 2004.

Pilot Ramon Morillas set a world record in June 1998, flying a PAP paramotor across Spain from the southwest to the northeast over a distance of 644 km (400 mi) covered in about 11.5 hours.

== Aircraft ==
Summary of aircraft built by Marbella Parapente
| Model name | First flight | Number built | Type |
|---|---|---|---|
| Marbella Parapente Paramotor PAP | mid-2000s | | Paramotor |
