= MacDonald S-20 =

S-20

General information
- Type: Sport aircraft
- National origin: United States
- Manufacturer: Homebuilt
- Designer: Robert A. MacDonald
- Number built: 100 sets of plans sold by 1976

History
- First flight: 9 March 1972

The MacDonald S-20 is a single-seat sport aircraft that was designed in the United States in the early 1970s and marketed for home building.

The aircraft is a conventional, low-wing cantilever monoplane with fixed tailwheel undercarriage and an open cockpit. Construction is of metal throughout, with a forward fuselage of welded steel tube construction, with the rear fuselage built up of aluminium bulkheads and longerons. The wings and tail are also of aluminium construction, and the entire aircraft is skinned in the same material. Pop rivets are used extensively to simplify construction.

The S-20 designation was applied to the prototype (registration N106AB), while aircraft built from the plans were designated S-21.

In 2009 and 2010 changes were made to the original design to add a cockpit canopy, engine cowling and electrical system, including an avionics bus and starter motor. Aircraft with these changes are designated S-22.

== Specifications (S-20) ==
Data from Jane's All the World's Aircraft 1977–78, 547

General characteristics

- Crew: One pilot
- Length: 18 ft 6 in (5.64 m)
- Wingspan: 25 ft 0 in (7.62 m)
- Height: 5 ft 3 in (1.60 m)
- Wing area: 94 sq ft (8.7 m^{2})
- Empty weight: 456 lb (206 kg)
- Gross weight: 720 lb (326 kg)
- Powerplant: 1 × converted Volkswagen automotive engine , 53 hp (40 kW)

Performance

- Maximum speed: 110 mph (177 km/h, 96 kn)
- Range: 251 mi (404 km, 218 nmi)
- Rate of climb: 850 ft/min (4.3 m/s)
