= Martin-Handasyde No. 3 =

Martin Handasyde No.3
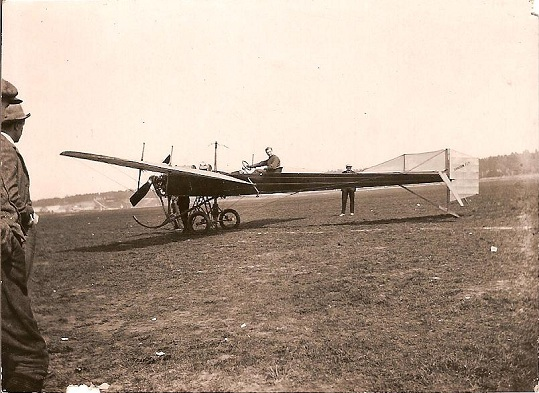
- The Martin-Handasyde 4B Dragonfly, two seater version of the Martin-Handasyde 3

General information
- Type: Sports aircraft
- National origin: United Kingdom
- Manufacturer: Martin-Handasyde
- Number built: One

History
- First flight: 1910

The Martin Handasyde No.3 was an early British single-seat monoplane design, built in partnership by H.P. Martin and George Handasyde. Only one was built.

== Design and development ==
The Martin-Handasyde No.3 bore a strong resemblance to the Antoinette monoplanes, with a slender wood-covered triangular fuselage, and tapered wings which were braced by mid-span kingposts. Lateral control was by wing-warping and the angle of incidence of the wings varied from 5° at the wing root to zero at the tip. The undercarriage consisted of a pair of wheels on a cross-axle supplemented by a forward-projecting curved skid. It was initially powered by a 60 hp (45 kW) Antoinette V-8 engine. This was later changed for a 40 hp (30 kW) J.A.P.

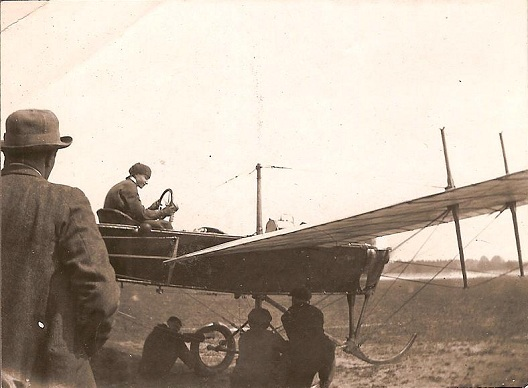
The Martin-Handasyde No.4B Dragonfly possibly at Brooklands in the summer of 1911

It was first flown at Brooklands by H.P. Martin during November 1910, and was flown throughout 1912 by Graham Gilmour, who was eventually killed in the aircraft when it suffered a mid-air structural failure over Richmond Park on 17 February 1912.

A two-seater version of the aircraft, the Martin Handasyde 4B, also called the Dragonfly, with a wingspan of 37 ft (11 m) was built for Thomas Sopwith and was displayed at the 1911 Aero Show at Olympia.

== Specifications ==
Data from Lewis

General characteristics

- Crew: 1
- Length: 28 ft 0 in (8.53 m)
- Wingspan: 32 ft 0 in (9.75 m)
- Wing area: 175 sq ft (16.3 m^{2})
- Empty weight: 560 lb (254 kg)
- Powerplant: 1 × J.A.P. , 40 hp (30 kW)
- Propellers: 2-bladed, 7 ft 0 in (2.13 m) diameter

Performance

- Maximum speed: 60 mph (97 km/h, 52 kn)
