= Mac Para Technology =

Czech paraglider manufacturer

Mac Para Technology s.r.o.
- Company type: Společnost s ručením omezeným
- Industry: Aerospace
- Founder: Peter Recek
- Headquarters: Rožnov pod Radhoštěm, Czech Republic
- Products: Paragliders
- Website: www.macpara.com

Mac Para Technology s.r.o. is a Czech aircraft manufacturer based in Rožnov pod Radhoštěm and founded by Peter Recek. The company specializes in the design and manufacture of paragliders and paramotor wings, in the form of ready-to-fly aircraft, as well as paragliding harnesses, rescue parachutes and glider bags.

The company is a společnost s ručením omezeným, a Czech private limited company.

By the mid-2000s the company offered a full range of paragliders, including the intermediate Eden, Intox and Muse, the competition Magus and the two-pace tandem Pasha paragliders.

== Aircraft ==
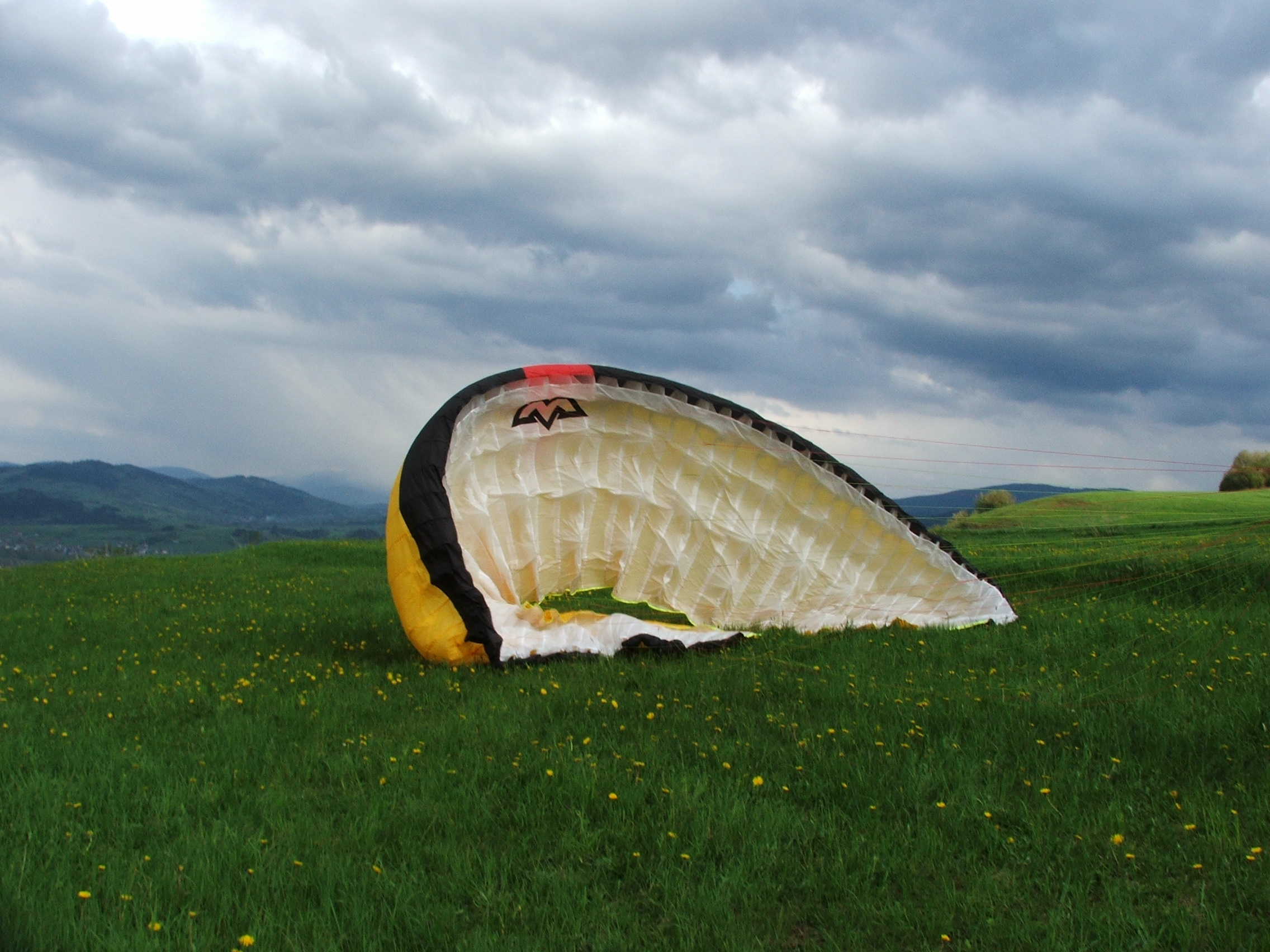
Mac Intox

Summary of aircraft built by Mac Para Technology:

- Mac Bitch
- Mac Blaze
- Mac Charger
- Mac Eden
- Mac Elan
- Mac Icon
- Mac Intox
- Mac Magus
- Mac Muse
- Mac Paradox
- Mac Pasha
- Mac Progress
- Mac T-Ride
- Mac Whistler
- Mac Yukon
