= Martin XO-4 =

American observation aircraft proposal

XO-4

General information
- Type: Observation
- National origin: United States
- Manufacturer: Glenn L. Martin Company
- Status: Canceled
- Number built: 0

The Martin XO-4 (Model 71) was a proposed observation aircraft designed by the Glenn L. Martin Company. It was designed to compete with the Curtiss XO-1, Douglas XO-2, and Dayton-Wright XO-3, and was to be powered by a Wright T-3 Tornado or a Liberty V-1650. Although it failed to receive a contract from the United States Navy, a single prototype (allocated the serial number 23-1255) was ordered by the United States Army Air Service, but this contract was canceled before the prototype could be built.
