= Mathews Turnerkraft =

American ultralight aircraft

Turnerkraft

General information
- Type: Ultralight aircraft
- National origin: United States
- Designer: Lyle Mathews
- Status: Production completed

The Mathews Turnerkraft, also called the Turnercraft, is an American ultralight aircraft that was designed by Lyle Mathews in conjunction with his partners Al Petit and Kindall and Wink Turner. It was made available in the form of plans for amateur construction.

== Design and development ==
The aircraft was designed to comply with US FAR 103 Ultralight Vehicles rules, including the category's maximum empty weight of 254 lb (115 kg). It features a biplane wing configuration, a single-seat, open cockpit and a single engine.

The aircraft is made from aluminum tubing, riveted together using gussets. Its top wing features full-span ailerons. The wings and tail are covered with aircraft fabric that is glued into place, heat shrunk and then finished with latex house paint, with two coats of paint on bottom surfaces and three on top to provide extra UV protection. The conventional landing gear includes a steerable tailwheel.

== Specifications (Turnerkraft) ==
General characteristics Performance
