= Mace-Trefethen M-101 Macerschmitt =

M-101 Macerschmitt

General information
- Type: Homebuilt aircraft
- National origin: United States
- Designer: Harvey Mace

History
- First flight: 15 July 1959

The Mace-Trefethen M-101 Macerschmitt, also called the Could-Bee, is a single place homebuilt aircraft design built in the late 1950s.

== Design ==
The M-101 is a single-place, strut-braced, tapered mid-wing, conventional landing gear equipped aircraft. Entrance is through a sliding canopy. Brake components were adapted from a Cessna 310 and a Piper Cub.

== Operational history ==
The M-101 was test flown on 15, July 1959 at Sacramento Municipal Airport.

== Specifications (Mace-Trefethen M-101 Macerschmitt) ==
Data from Sport Aviation

General characteristics

- Crew: 1
- Length: 17 ft 9 in (5.41 m)
- Wingspan: 16 ft 6 in (5.03 m)
- Wing area: 65.5 sq ft (6.09 m^{2})
- Airfoil: NACA 0009
- Empty weight: 685 lb (311 kg)
- Gross weight: 2,205 lb (1,000 kg)
- Powerplant: 1 × Lycoming O-290 , 125 hp (93 kW)
- Propellers: 2-bladed

Performance

- Maximum speed: 170 kn (200 mph, 320 km/h)
- Cruise speed: 150 kn (170 mph, 270 km/h)
- Stall speed: 65 kn (75 mph, 121 km/h)
- Rate of climb: 2,000 ft/min (10 m/s)
