= Marais avionette =

General information
- Type: Ultralight aircraft
- National origin: France
- Designer: Charles Marais
- Number built: 1

History
- First flight: First semester 1923

The Marais avionette (Note: avionette was not a name but its type; it was the way the nameless Marais aircraft was often described at the time.) was a single seat, low-powered cantilever monoplane built in France in 1923 to compete in a newspaper-sponsored tour contest. Engine selection problems prevented it from taking part. It was modified into a glider for a later competition but crashed during qualification. It was one of the first aircraft to have a retractable undercarriage.

== Design ==
The Marais was a mid wing cantilever monoplane with wing of rectangular plan out to blunted tips, thick in section with a maximum thickness to chord ratio of 17% and mounted without dihedral. It was built around two spruce box spars, with its leading edges and tips covered in plywood and the rest with fabric. 3 m (9 ft 10 in) long broad ailerons were mounted on the rear spar.

Its fuselage was very simple and based on four longerons, rectangular in section and ply-covered, tapering strongly in profile from the square section over the fuselage to a horizontal knife-edge at the tail. The corresponding taper in plan was only slight. The Marais was initially powered by a small Anzani 5.2–7.5 kW (7–10 hp) flat twin mounted uncowled in the nose and the open, wide cockpit was just ahead of the wing trailing edge. Its high aspect ratio, rectangular plan tailplane was mounted at the top of the fuselage with the hinge line of its rectangular elevators over the knife-edge. The elevators had a cut-out for movement of a rhombodedral rudder. There was no fixed fin.

The Marais had retractable landing gear, most unusual in its day for any aircraft but particularly so for a lightplane; Marais was aware that the drag of a fixed undercarriage would be particularly detrimental to the performance of a very low-powered aircraft. Each mainwheel was mounted on a single duralumin box-tube leg which slid on rollers inside another box-tube fixed inside the fuselage on two dural strengthening plates. The legs could be raised or lowered by the pilot via a crank-driven chain and an automatic locking device fixed the gear up or down. When raised, the wheels were completely enclosed under shaped fairings. The legs had no shock absorbers; instead, large pneumatic tyres softened landing shocks.

== Operational history ==
Charles Marais designed and built his avionette to compete in the July 1923 Grand-Prix du "Petit Parisien", a contest for low-powered aircraft organised by the French newspaper of that name. The date of its first flight is not known exactly but the aircraft was being refined at Buc during June 1923. Rather late in the day, Marais realised that the Anzani engine did not meet the competition's all-French requirement and he was unable to find a French aircraft engine supplier with an available replacement. He was a registered contestant in the Grand-Prix and was reported before it began to be using a French motor-cycle engine, but there was no further mention of him at the event.

Instead, he modified the aircraft into a glider, with some adjustment of the pilot's position to return the centre of gravity to its proper position after removing the engine. It then went to the Congrès de Vauville in August, a contest including both gliders and low-powered aircraft. His usual pilot, Collangettes, had been seriously hurt in an accident while flying another aircraft, so Marais had to fly it himself. He took off on 24 August 1923, the last day of qualification, but almost immediately the wind caught him and the glider stalled and crashed. Happily he walked away and his aircraft was not too badly damaged but it failed to qualify. At the end of the contest the jury presented him with two special awards for his efforts.

== Specifications ==
Data from Les Ailes, January 1924

General characteristics

- Crew: One
- Length: 5.50 m (18 ft 1 in)
- Wingspan: 10.40 m (34 ft 1 in)
- Height: 1.30 m (4 ft 3 in)
- Wing area: 12 m^{2} (130 sq ft)
- Empty weight: 135 kg (298 lb)
- Gross weight: 230 kg (507 lb)
- Powerplant: 1 × Anzani flat twin, 7.5 kW (10 hp)
- Propellers: 2-bladed
