= JPM 01 Médoc =

French homebuilt aircraft

General information
- Type: Amateur-built aircraft
- National origin: France
- Manufacturer: Avions Jean-Pierre Marie (JPM)
- Designer: Jean-Pierre Marie
- Status: Plans available (2015)

History
- Introduction date: 1987

The JPM 01 Médoc is a French amateur-built aircraft that was designed by Jean-Pierre Marie in 1987 and produced by Avions Jean-Pierre Marie (JPM) of Le Mesnil-Esnard. The aircraft is supplied as plans for amateur construction.

The aircraft is named for the French community of Médoc.

== Design and development ==
The Médoc features a cantilever low wing, a two-seats-in-side-by-side configuration enclosed cockpit under a bubble canopy, fixed tricycle landing gear and a single engine in tractor configuration.

The aircraft is made from wood with its flying surfaces covered in doped aircraft fabric. Its 7.50 m (24.6 ft) span wing has an area of 9.30 m^{2} (100.1 sq ft) and mounts flaps. Standard engines recommended are 60 kW (80 hp)-class Volkswagen air-cooled engines, including the 60 kW (80 hp) Limbach L2000 four-stroke powerplant.

Almost thirty years after its introduction the aircraft was redesigned and lightened, gaining slotted flaps to reduce stall speed.

== Specifications (JPM 01 Médoc) ==
Data from Bayerl, Tacke and JPM

General characteristics

- Crew: one
- Capacity: one passenger
- Length: 6 m (19 ft 8 in)
- Wingspan: 7.50 m (24 ft 7 in)
- Wing area: 9.30 m^{2} (100.1 sq ft)
- Empty weight: 286 kg (631 lb)
- Gross weight: 496 kg (1,093 lb)
- Fuel capacity: 60 litres (13 imp gal; 16 US gal)
- Powerplant: 1 × Limbach L2000 four cylinder, air-cooled, four stroke aircraft engine, 60 kW (80 hp)

Performance

- Maximum speed: 210 km/h (130 mph, 110 kn)
- Cruise speed: 175 km/h (109 mph, 94 kn)
- Stall speed: 70 km/h (43 mph, 38 kn)
- Never exceed speed: 247 km/h (153 mph, 133 kn)
- Range: 700 km (430 mi, 380 nmi) with no reserve
- Endurance: 4 hours plus 0.5 hour reserve
- Service ceiling: 4,100 m (13,500 ft)
- g limits: +3.5/–1.5
- Rate of climb: 4 m/s (790 ft/min)
- Wing loading: 53.3 kg/m^{2} (10.9 lb/sq ft)
