= Mattioni =

Mattioni is a surname. Notable people with the surname include:

- Eszter Mattioni (1902–1993), Hungarian painter
- Felipe Mattioni (born 1988), Brazilian footballer
- Patrick Mattioni (born 1966), French gymnast

== See also ==
- Mattoni
