= Marrone VM-1 =

American aircraft

General information
- Type: Homebuilt aircraft
- National origin: United States of America
- Designer: Vinnie Marrone
- Number built: 1

History
- First flight: August 1957
- Developed from: J-3 Cub

The Marrone VM-1 is a low wing, single place taildragger from designer Vinnie Marrone.

== Design and development ==
The design goals for the aircraft were to have an economical, high-speed, maneuverable sport aircraft.

The aircraft rear fuselage section is modified from a J-3 Cub. The wings are built in two piece removable panels with spruce wood spars.

The aircraft was first flown and tested by the owner/builder in 1957. Ground testing and initial flights were made at Islip long island NY. Originally designed and flown as a single seater. It was modified to a 2-seat design in the late 60s or early 70s.

== Operational history ==
The prototype flew regularly until 1987, when it was flown into trees on a high speed fly-by into the sun at an airshow at Jobstown, New Jersey.

== Specifications (Marrone VM-1) ==
Data from Sport Aviation

General characteristics

- Length: 17 ft (5.2 m)
- Wingspan: 20 ft (6.1 m)
- Wing area: 80 sq ft (7.4 m^{2})
- Airfoil: NACA 23015
- Empty weight: 600 lb (272 kg)
- Gross weight: 850 lb (386 kg)
- Powerplant: 1 × Continental A-65 , 65 hp (48 kW)

Performance

- Maximum speed: 117 kn (135 mph, 217 km/h)
- Stall speed: 43 kn (50 mph, 80 km/h)
