= Marlman Flying Girder =

American agricultural airplane

Flying Girder
- Front quarter view of the Marlman Flying Girder

General information
- Type: Agricultural airplane
- National origin: United States
- Manufacturer: William A. Marlman
- Number built: 1

History
- Introduction date: 1957

The Marlman Flying Girder was a low-cost American cropduster developed in the 1950s.

== Design and development ==
The Flying Girder was the project of William A. Marlman, who was based in Las Animas, Colorado. A 1955 newspaper report detailed that Marlman had designed an agricultural aircraft, referred to the "Pack Air", and that it was currently under construction. If the aircraft proved successful, Marlman planned to establish a factory at Las Animas in order to produce them.

Two aluminum channels, 20 ft (6.1 m) in length, were bolted together to form a single box-section beam that formed the basis of the design. A 260 hp (190 kW) Lycoming engine, driving a tractor propeller, was fitted to the foremost point of the box beam. Positioned behind the engine was a simple slab-sided enclosed fuselage. The aircraft had a constant chord rectangular wing planform, with no dihedral. The wings featured full-span flaps, and endplates fitted to the wingtips. A conventional tailplane and tailfin were located at the aftmost point of the box beam. The Flying Girder was fitted with a fixed conventional undercarriage.

To cater to its intended function as an agricultural aircraft, it was designed to spread both dust and sprays. A 20 cu ft (0.57 m^{3}) hopper was incorporated into the rear of the fuselage, and 50 US gal (190 L) tanks were built into the wings.

== Operational history ==
By early 1957 the aircraft had been approved by the CAA. Its operational history is not known.

== Specifications ==
Data from Popular Mechanics

General characteristics

- Crew: 1
- Powerplant: 1 × Lycoming piston engine, 260 hp (190 kW)

Performance

- Cruise speed: 120 mph (190 km/h, 100 kn)
- Landing speed: 70–90 mph (110–140 km/h; 61–78 kn)
- Stall speed: 40 mph (64 km/h, 35 kn)

== See also ==
Aircraft of comparable role, configuration, and era

- Grumman Ag Cat
- Larson D-1
