= M-Squared Breese =

Type of aircraft

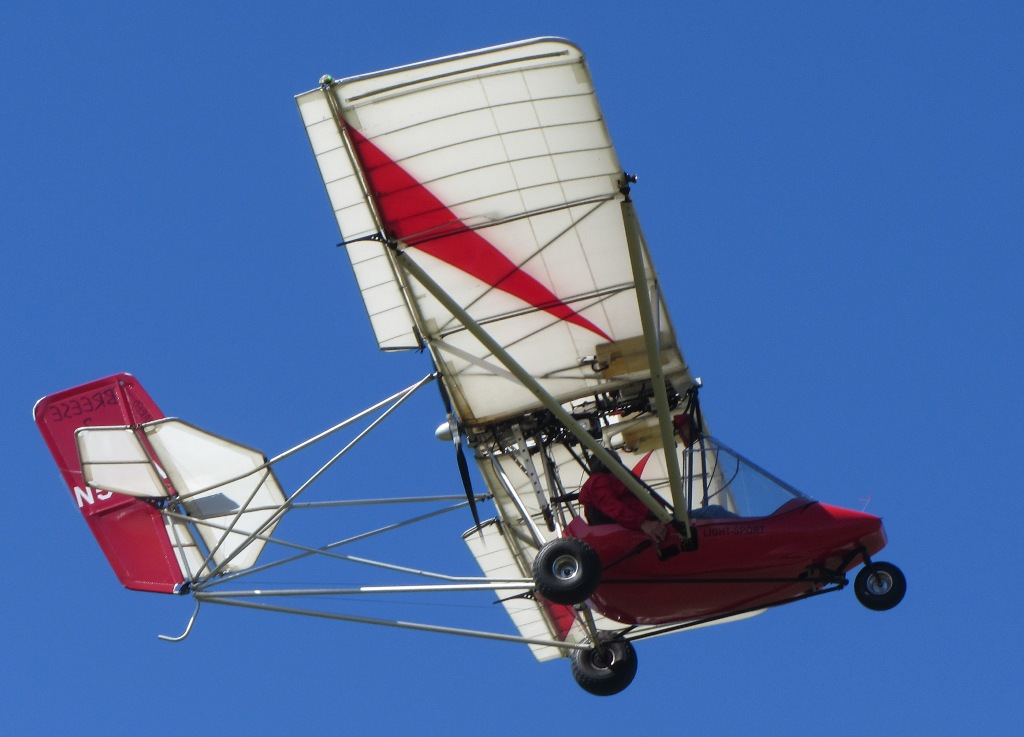
- Breese 2

General information
- Type: Kit aircraft
- National origin: United States
- Manufacturer: M-Squared Aircraft
- Designer: Paul Mather
- Status: In production

History
- Introduction date: 1996
- First flight: 1996
- Developed from: Eipper Quicksilver

The M-Squared Breese is a large family of high-wing, strut-braced, pusher configuration, tricycle gear, ultralight aircraft produced by M-Squared Aircraft of St. Elmo, Alabama in kit form, for amateur construction.

== Design and development ==
The M-Squared line of aircraft was started in 1996 when a former Quicksilver Manufacturing employee, Paul Mather, decided to offer retrofit kits to convert the Quicksilver II from cable-braced wings to a strut-braced configuration with jury struts. The kits proved popular and Mather expanded to market complete aircraft based on the basic Quicksilver layout. The first two aircraft in the series were the two-seat double surface wing Sport 1000 and the two-seat single surface wing Sprint 1000.

The series all share similar construction featuring a bolted aluminium tube structure with the flying surfaces covered in pre-sewn Dacron sailcloth envelopes. All models are open-cockpit, but some have optional streamlined pods available. All models use tricycle landing gear and steerable nosewheels.

The Breese 2 DS and SS have been accepted by the US Federal Aviation Administration as approved special light-sport aircraft.

== Variants ==
Sport 1000
Two seats in side-by-side configuration, double surface sailcloth wing, based on the Quicksilver MX Sport II. The construction time from the assembly kit is reported as 75 hours. Standard engine is the 64 hp (48 kW) Rotax 582, with the 80 hp (60 kW) Rotax 912 optional. The now out-of-production 74 hp (55 kW) Rotax 618 was at one time an optional engine, as well. Other options include streamlined cockpit pod, wheel pants and extra fuel tankage. In production.
Sprint 1000
Two seats in side-by-side configuration, designed for the US experimental amateur-built category, 64 hp (48 kW) Rotax 582 two-stroke powerplant, 1,400 lb (635 kg) gross weight, single surface sailcloth wing. In production.
Sprint 1000 FP
Two-seat amphibious floatplane designed for the US experimental amateur-built category, 100 hp (75 kW) Rotax 912ULS four-stroke powerplant, 1,400 lb (635 kg) gross weight, single surface sailcloth wing, 1650 Full Lotus floats. In production.
Breese XL
Single-seat aircraft designed for the US FAR 103 Ultralight Vehicles category, 28 hp (21 kW) Hirth F33 two-stroke or the 35 hp (26 kW) Revolution Rotary 301 powerplant, 550 lb (249 kg) gross weight, single surface sailcloth wing. In production.

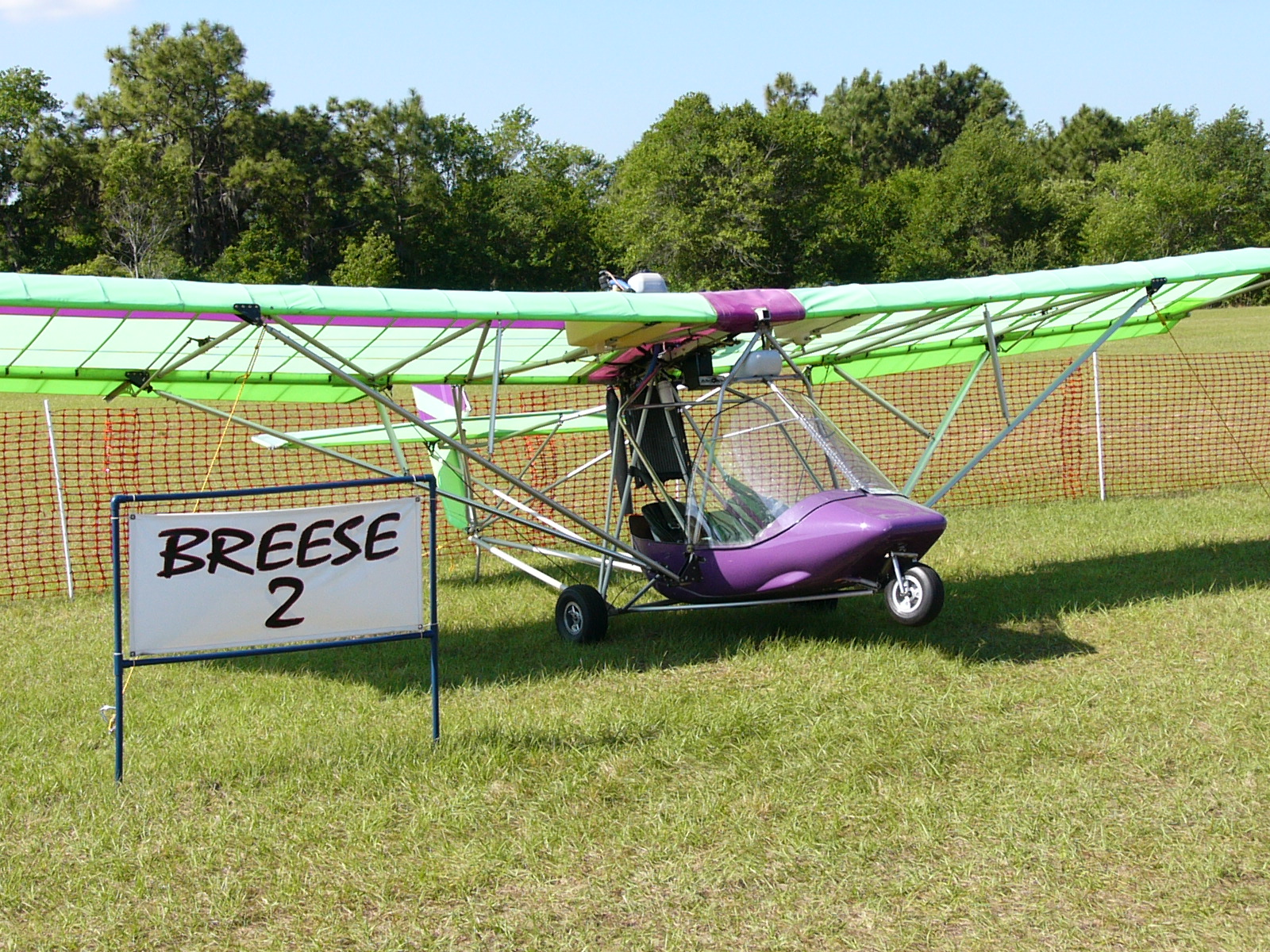
Breese 2 SS, with single surface wing

Breese 2 SS
Two-seat aircraft designed for the US light-sport aircraft category, 64 hp (48 kW) Rotax 582 two-stroke powerplant, 1,320 lb (599 kg) gross weight, single surface sailcloth wing. In production.

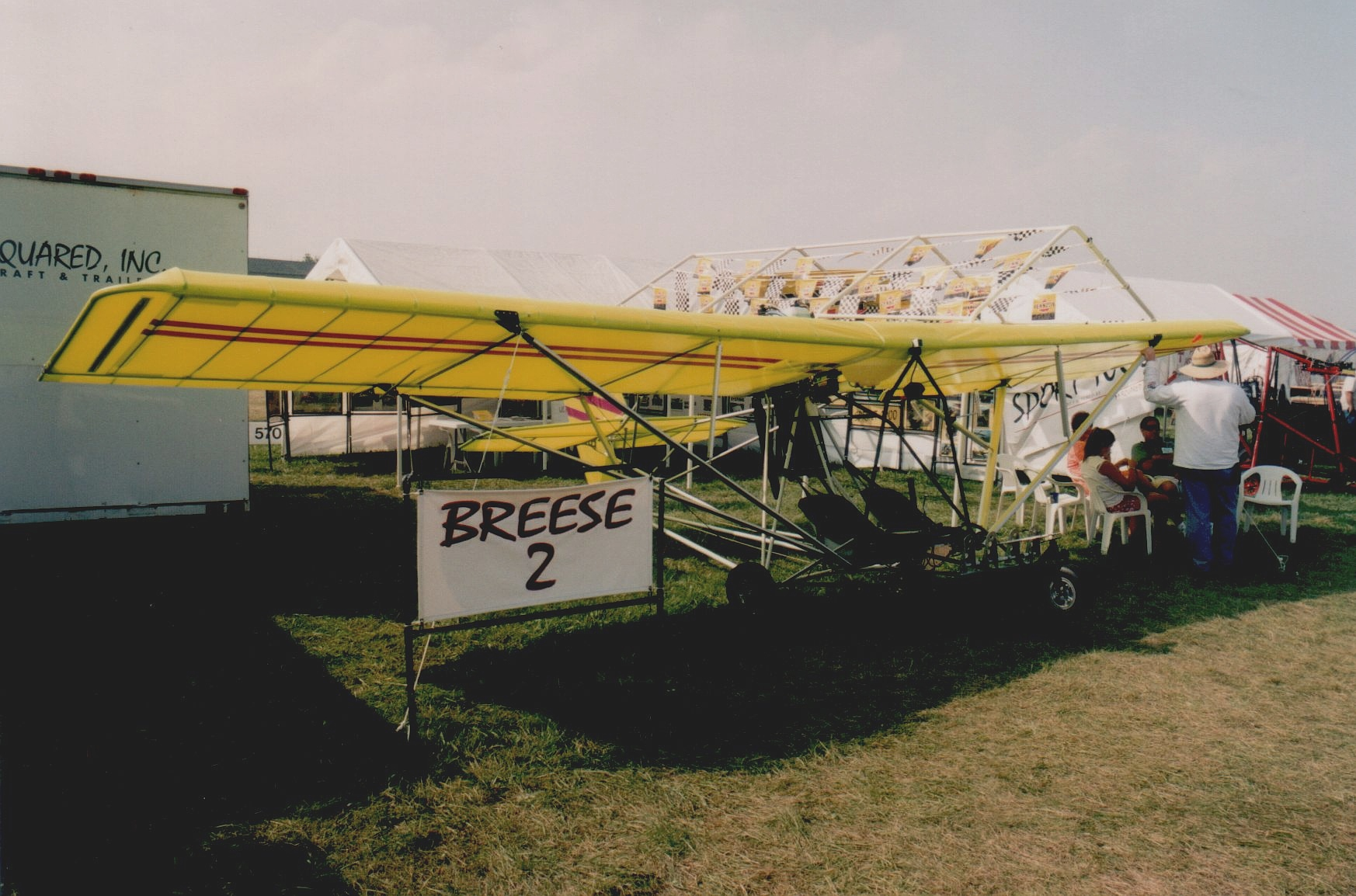
M-Squared Breese 2 DS

Breese 2 DS
Two-seat aircraft designed for the US light-sport aircraft category, 64 hp (48 kW) Rotax 582 two-stroke powerplant, 1,320 lb (599 kg) gross weight, double surface sailcloth wing. In production.
Breese DS
Single-seat aircraft designed for the US experimental amateur-built aircraft category, 40 hp (30 kW) Rotax 447 or 50 hp (37 kW) Rotax 503 two-stroke powerplant, 650 lb (295 kg) gross weight, double surface sailcloth wing. In production.
Breese SS
Single-seat aircraft designed for the US experimental amateur-built aircraft category, 40 hp (30 kW) Rotax 447 or 50 hp (37 kW) Rotax 503 two-stroke powerplant, 650 lb (295 kg) gross weight, double surface sailcloth wing. In production.
Ultra-X
Single-seat aircraft designed for the US experimental amateur-built aircraft category, 80 hp (60 kW) Rotax 680 two-stroke powerplant, 900 lb (408 kg) gross weight, double surface sailcloth wing, with a symmetrical airfoil. In production.
American Tugz
Single-seat aircraft designed for the US experimental amateur-built aircraft category, 80 hp (60 kW) Rotax 680 two-stroke powerplant, 900 lb (408 kg) gross weight, single surface sailcloth wing, designed for towing hang gliders aloft. In production.

== Specifications (Sport 1000) ==
Data from Cliche and M-Squared

General characteristics

- Crew: one
- Capacity: one passenger
- Length: 19 ft 0 in (5.79 m)
- Wingspan: 32 ft 9 in (9.98 m)
- Height: 7 ft 10 in (2.39 m)
- Wing area: 180 sq ft (17 m^{2})
- Empty weight: 475 lb (215 kg)
- Gross weight: 1,400 lb (635 kg)
- Fuel capacity: 8 US gallons (30 litres)
- Powerplant: 1 × Rotax 582 , 64 hp (48 kW)
- Propellers: 2-bladed, 5 ft 8 in (1.73 m) diameter

Performance

- Maximum speed: 77 mph (124 km/h, 67 kn)
- Cruise speed: 63 mph (101 km/h, 55 kn)
- Stall speed: 34 mph (55 km/h, 30 kn) power off
- Never exceed speed: 100 mph (160 km/h, 87 kn)
- Range: 90 mi (140 km, 78 nmi) at 75% power
- g limits: +6/-4
- Maximum glide ratio: 5.75:1
- Wing loading: 7.8 lb/sq ft (38 kg/m^{2})

Avionics

- none
