= Maestranza Central de Aviación Triciclo-Experimental =

Triciclo-Experimental

General information
- Type: Light aircraft
- National origin: Chile
- Manufacturer: Maestranza Central de Aviación
- Status: Prototype
- Number built: 1

History
- First flight: 1947

The Maestranza Central de Aviación Triciclo-Experimental (also designated XX-01) was a prototype Chilean light aircraft of the 1940s.

== Design and development ==
In 1947, the Maestranza Central de Aviación, the Central Workshops of the Chilean Air Force designed and built the first Chilean-designed aircraft, the Triciclo-Experimental, unveiled in May 1947. The Triciclo, designed by Alfredo D. Ferrer, was a low-winged monoplane of wooden construction with a fixed tricycle landing gear and a twin tail. The crew of two sat side by side in an enclosed cockpit, and were provided with dual flight controls. A single Franklin air-cooled horizontally opposed piston engine drove a two-bladed propeller.

== Specifications ==
Data from Jane's All The World's Aircraft 1951–52

General characteristics

- Crew: 2
- Length: 6.50 m (21 ft 4 in)
- Wingspan: 11.0 m (36 ft 1 in)
- Height: 1.80 m (5 ft 11 in)
- Wing area: 13 m^{2} (140 sq ft)
- Empty weight: 355 kg (783 lb)
- Gross weight: 600 kg (1,323 lb)
- Powerplant: 1 × Franklin four-cylinder air-cooled horizontally-opposed piston engine, 75 kW (100 hp)

Performance

- Maximum speed: 180 km/h (110 mph, 97 kn)
- Cruise speed: 160 km/h (99 mph, 86 kn)
- Range: 1,000 km (620 mi, 540 nmi)
- Service ceiling: 5,500 m (18,000 ft)
