= Mathewson =

Mathewson is a surname. Notable people with the surname include:

- Christy Mathewson (1880–1925), baseball player
- Courtney Mathewson (born 1986), water polo player
- Elisha Mathewson (1767–1853), US senator
- George Mathewson (born 1940), Chairman of the Royal Bank of Scotland
- Henry Mathewson (1886–1917), baseball pitcher
- Rhys Mathewson, New Zealand comedian
- Ron Mathewson (1944–2020), jazz musician

== See also ==
- Christy Mathewson–Memorial Stadium
- Mathewson Farm
