= OSKBES MAI-208 =

MAI-208

General information
- Type: Ultralight autogyro
- National origin: Russia
- Manufacturer: OSKBES Moscow Aviation Institute (MAI)

History
- First flight: remaining unflown in May 2010

The OSKBES MAI-208 is a single-engine, two-seat autogyro, designed and built in Russia, which utilises the fuselage of the MAI-223 ultralight. It had been completed but not flown by spring 2010.

== Design and development ==
Work on the MAI208 began in 2006. It first appeared in public at HeliRussia 2009 and was also seen at MAKS-09 and HeliRussia in May 2010, though it was still unflown. It retains many of the features of the fixed wing MAI-223, having a three-blade tractor propeller driven by a Rotax 912 flat-four piston engine. The two aircraft share most of the fuselage, including its cabin, side by side seating and large, glazed side doors as well as the conventional undercarriage with its fuselage-mounted, rear leaning legs. The autogyro's two-blade rotor is mounted on a mast largely within a wide chord fairing, though with a significant part exposed below the rotor head. The other differences are in the empennage; the MAI-208 has a straight edged, slightly tapered tailplane and elevators with a cutout for rudder movement but the swept vertical surface of the MAI-223 was replaced by a small triangular fin carrying an almost semicircular rudder. By HeliRussia 2010 this had been reworked, with a wider chord, round topped rudder and a long fin/fillet with an almost horizontal upper edge.

The first flight was originally scheduled for 2009, then revised to 2010, though it remained unannounced at HeliRussia 2010.

== Specifications ==
Data from Jane's All the World's Aircraft 2011/12

General characteristics

- Capacity: two
- Length: 5.30 m (17 ft 5 in) fuselage
- Height: 2.90 m (9 ft 6 in) overall, flight configuration
- Empty weight: 220 kg (485 lb)
- Max takeoff weight: 550 kg (1,213 lb)
- Powerplant: 1 × Rotax 912S , 73.5 kW (98.6 hp)
- Main rotor diameter: 10.0 m (32 ft 10 in)
- Main rotor area: 78.54 m^{2} (845.4 sq ft) 2-blade
- Propellers: 3-bladed

Performance

- Maximum speed: 160 km/h (99 mph, 86 kn)
- Stall speed: 50 km/h (31 mph, 27 kn) minimum speed in level flight
- Take-off run: 100 m (330 ft)
- All performance figures are estimates
