= MAI Foton =

Czech-Soviet experimental aircraft

Foton

General information
- Other name(s): Photon
- Role: Research
- National origin: Czech Republic/Soviet Union
- Designer: Moscow Aviation Institute
- Number built: 1

History
- Manufactured: 1987

The MAI Foton was an experimental Czech research aircraft created to test a blown flap system. The aircraft featured no ailerons, instead using two small engines under the wing roots for roll control.

== Specifications ==
General characteristics

- Crew: 1
- Length: 27 ft 2 in (8.27 m)
- Wingspan: 24 ft 0 in (7.32 m)
- Height: 13 ft 0 in (3.97 m)
- Gross weight: 30,000 lb (13,608 kg)
- Powerplant: 1 × Tumansky RU-19-300

Performance

- Maximum speed: 400 kn (460 mph, 740 km/h) calculated estimate
- Service ceiling: 25,000–30,000 ft (7,600–9,100 m) operating altitude
- Thrust/weight: 0.36
