= Max Holste MH.20 =

MH.20
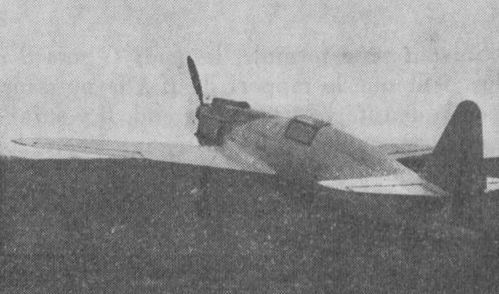

General information
- Type: Racing aircraft
- National origin: France
- Manufacturer: Avions Max Holste
- Designer: Max Holste
- Number built: 1

History
- First flight: 25 July 1941

The Max Holste MH.20 was a French single-engined racing aircraft built to compete in the 1939 Coupe Deutsch de la Meurthe air race but not flying until 1941. A single example was built.

== Design and development ==
In January 1939, the 26-year-old aircraft designer Max Holste began work at l'École de Réèducation Professionnelle, a Paris technical school for training the unemployed for work in the aviation industry, to design an all-metal single-engined racing aircraft. The design, intended to compete in the 1939 Coupe Deutsch de la Meurthe air race, was a mid-winged monoplane with a fixed tailwheel undercarriage. An enclosed cockpit was provided for the aircraft's pilot, situated behind the wing. The planned power-plant was a Béarn vertically-opposed air-cooled twelve-cylinder engine.

The airframe was effectively complete by June 1939, with only the engine awaited, with it being hoped that the aircraft would make its maiden flight by August 1939. This did not occur, however, and the aircraft did not fly until 25 July 1941, powered by a Régnier air-cooled inverted 12Hoo V12 engine.

== Specifications ==
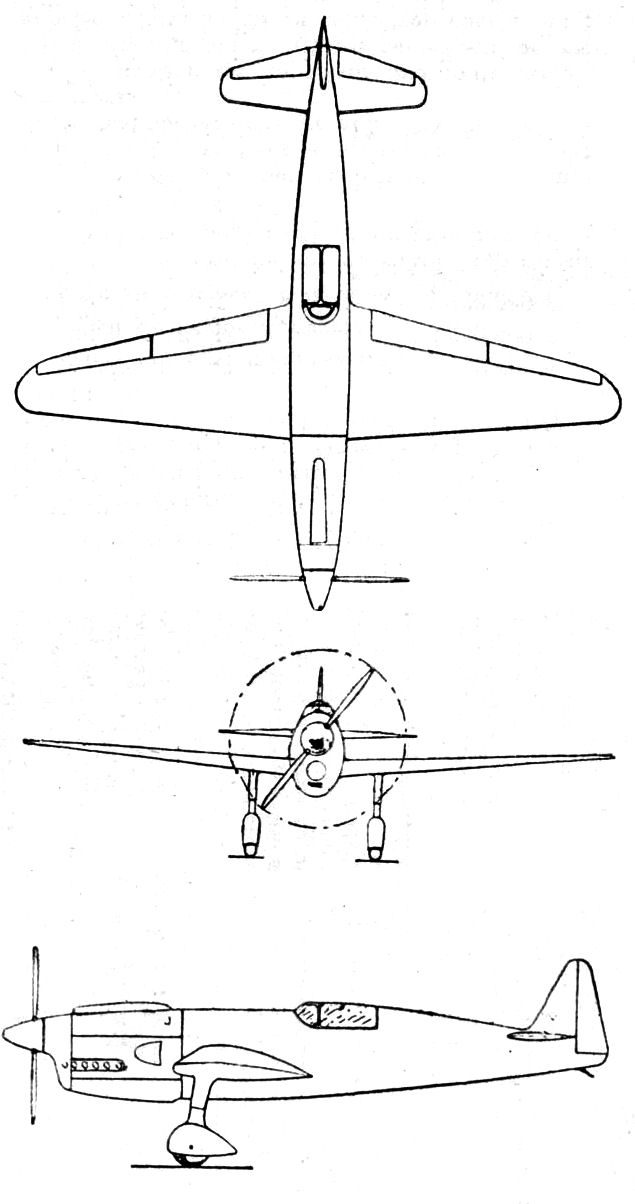
Max Holste MH-20 3-view drawing from L'Aerophile January 1943

Data from L'Avion "Max Holste 20" Coupe Deutsch

General characteristics

- Crew: 1
- Length: 6.64 m (21 ft 9 in)
- Wingspan: 6.68 m (21 ft 11 in)
- Height: 2.10 m (6 ft 11 in)
- Wing area: 6.9 m^{2} (74 sq ft)
- Empty weight: 585 kg (1,290 lb)
- Gross weight: 834 kg (1,839 lb)
- Fuel capacity: 200 L (44 imp gal; 53 US gal)
- Powerplant: 1 × Régnier 12HOO air-cooled inverted V12 engine, 310 kW (420 hp)

Performance

- Maximum speed: 496 km/h (308 mph, 268 kn)
- Cruise speed: 477 km/h (296 mph, 258 kn)
- Range: 500 km (310 mi, 270 nmi)
