= MAI Kvant =

Kvant
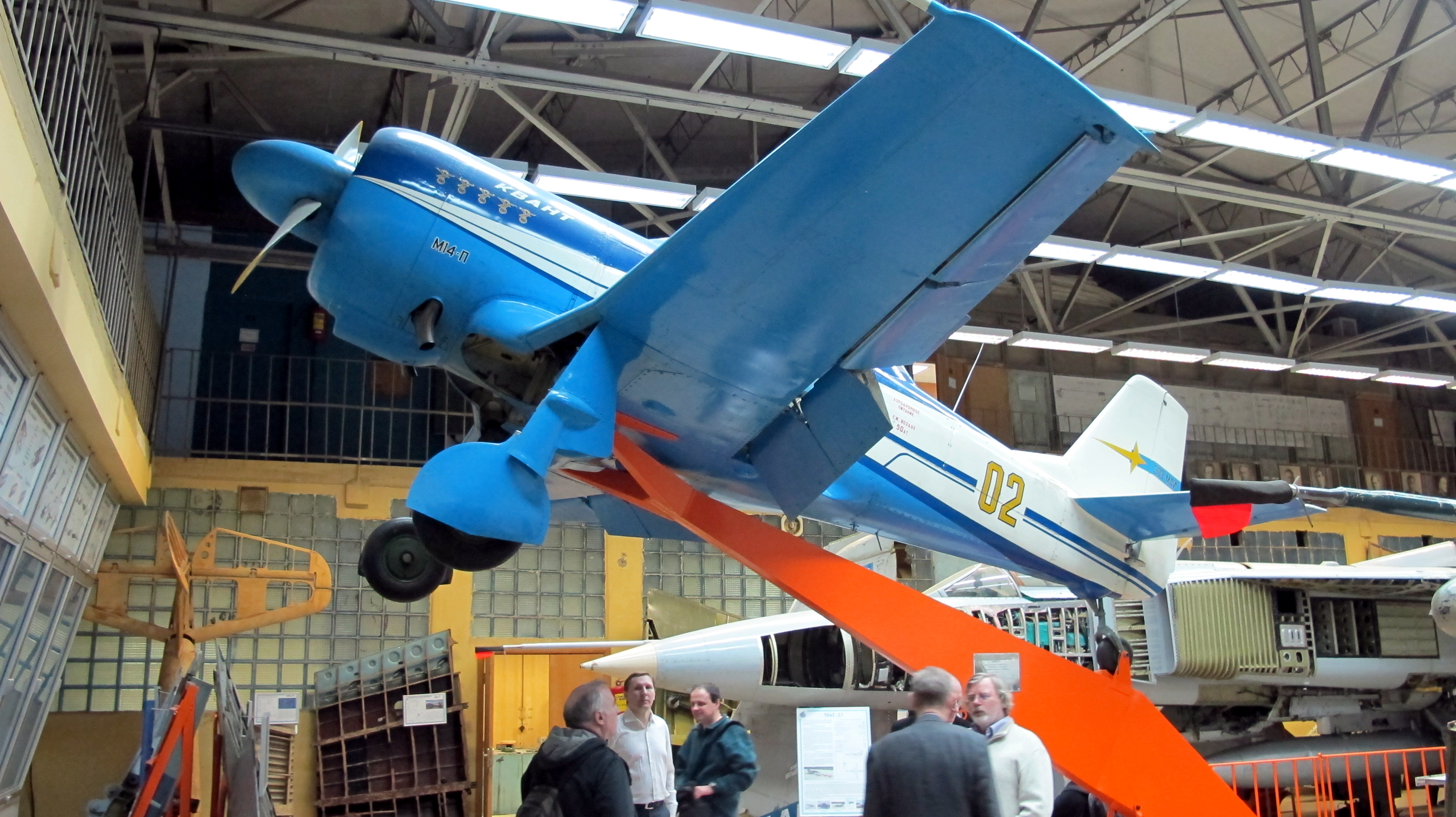
- Kvant in the MAI

General information
- Type: Aerobatic trainer
- National origin: Soviet Union
- Designer: Moscow Aviation Institute
- Number built: 2

History
- First flight: 1967

The MAI Kvant (also known as the MAI-SKB-3PM) was a Soviet aerobatic trainer designed by students at the Moscow Aviation Institute. In October 1967 the aircraft was displayed at the Economic Achievement Exhibition in Moscow. The Kvant was a single-seat low-wing monoplane with a retractable main landing gear and a fixed tailwheel. It was powered by a 360 hp (268 kW) Vedeneyev M14P radial engine. The aircraft held five official FAI world records.

== Specifications ==
Data from

General characteristics

- Crew: 1
- Length: 5.7 m (18 ft 8 in)
- Wingspan: 7.5 m (24 ft 7 in)
- Wing area: 8.56 m^{2} (92.1 sq ft)
- Empty weight: 676 kg (1,490 lb)
- Max takeoff weight: 920 kg (2,028 lb)
- Powerplant: × Vedeneyev M14P nine-cylinder air-cooled radial, 270 kW (360 hp)
- Propellers: 2-bladed

Performance

- Maximum speed: 380 km/h (240 mph, 210 kn)
- Rate of climb: 16 m/s (3,100 ft/min)
