= MAI-60 Snezhinka =

General information
- Type: FAI Standard Class, single seat sailplane
- National origin: USSR
- Manufacturer: Moscow Aviation Institute (MAI)
- Designer: MAI team led by V.P.Makharov

History
- First flight: 1961

The MAI-60 (Russian: Снежинка; English: Snowflake) was an FAI Standard Class, single seat sailplane designed and built in the USSR in the early 1960s. It suffered from both aerodynamic and structural problems and did not reach production.

== Design and development ==
The Snezhinka was a prototype single seat, standard class (15 m (49 ft 3 in) wingspan) sailplane with a largely traditional wooden structure but with PVC foam filler strengthening.

Its high aspect ratio, mid-set, straight tapered wings had a laminar aerofoil and were built around a single, wide box spar. This formed the central part of the wing between 25% and 65% of the chord. Its leading and trailing edges, covered with 1 mm (0.04 in) plywood skin, were supported internally with PVC foam. The tips had end plates. Narrow-chord ailerons occupied about 45% of the trailing edges and there were also airbrakes.

The MAI-60's wooden fuselage was ply-skinned over stringers supported by bulkheads. Its cockpit was ahead of and over the wing leading edge, with its pilot in a semi-reclined seat under a single-piece, jettisonable canopy which ran smoothly into the raised rear fuselage. Aft, the fuselage tapered from below to a 90° butterfly tail with tetragonal fixed and control surfaces.

There were tanks for 51 L (11 imp gal; 13 US gal) of water ballast.

It landed on a central, semi-retractable monowheel aided by forward and tail skids.

Testing over 1961-2 showed that the flight characteristics were poor, with directional instabilities and a need for large pitch inputs, and that its spin behaviour was unusual. There was also a structural problem caused by low strength glue, so the MAI-60 did not reach production.

== Specifications ==
Data from j2mcPlaneurs except where noted

General characteristics

- Crew: one
- Length: 5.0 m (16 ft 5 in)
- Wingspan: 15.0 m (49 ft 3 in)
- Height: 1.2 m (3 ft 11 in)
- Wing area: 10.7 m^{2} (115 sq ft)
- Aspect ratio: 21
- Airfoil: NASA 663-618
- Empty weight: 210 kg (463 lb)
- Gross weight: 300 kg (661 lb) , without ballast

Performance

- Maximum glide ratio: 33 best
- Rate of sink: 0.7 m/s (140 ft/min) minimum
