= Martin N2M =

N2M
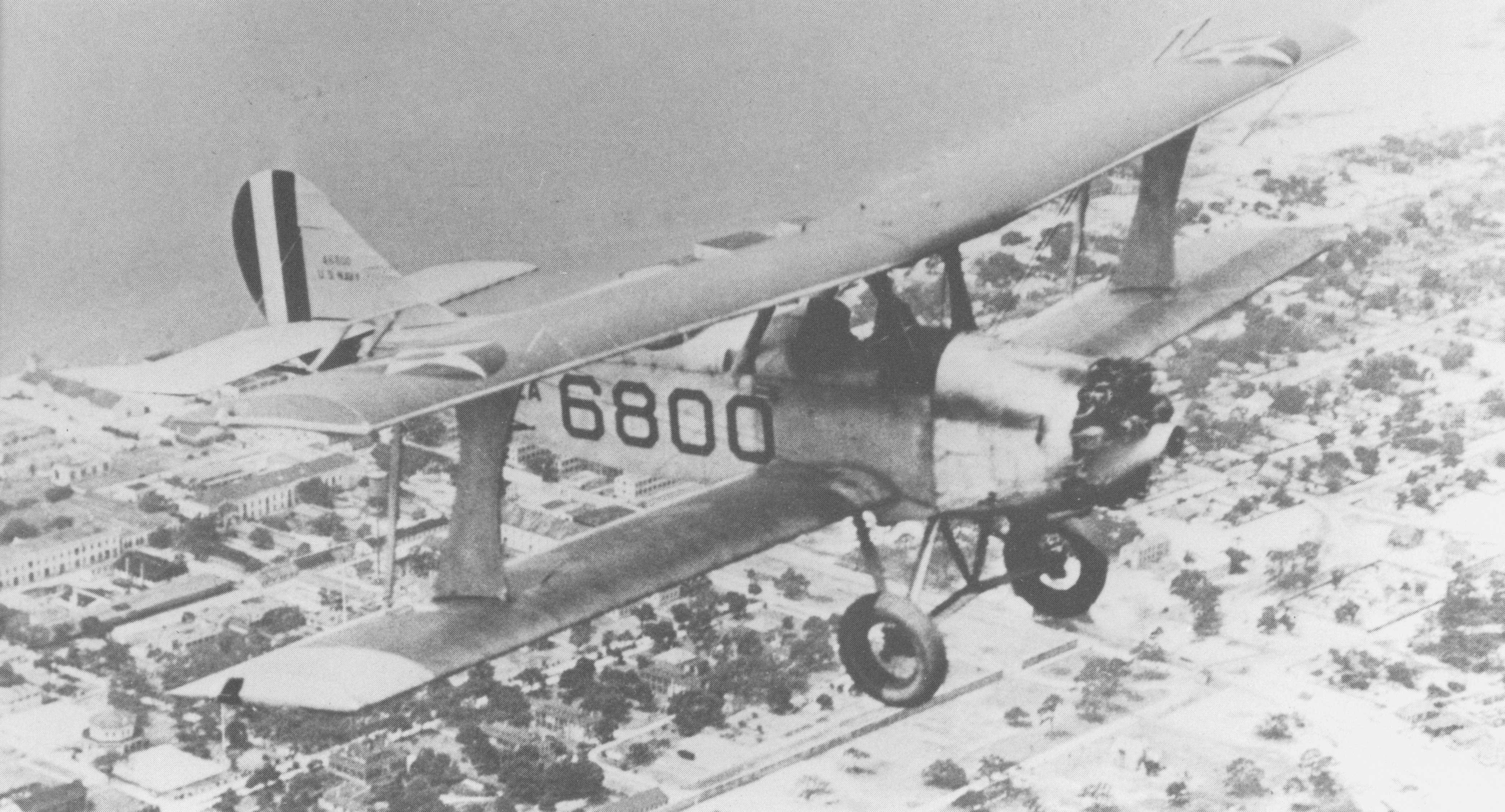

General information
- Type: Military training biplane
- National origin: United States
- Manufacturer: Martin
- Number built: 1

History
- First flight: 1924

The Martin N2M was a prototype American primary training biplane, built for the United States Navy by the Glenn L. Martin Company. It was never accepted by the Navy and only the prototype was built.

The prototype was designated N2M-1 by the United States Navy, and it first flew in 1924. The N2M-1 was based on the Martin 66 Night Mail and was a biplane powered by a 200 hp (149 kW) Wright-Hisso E-4 engine. It had two open cockpits in tandem for a crew of two.

== Specifications ==
Data from

General characteristics

- Crew: two
- Length: 27 ft 10 in (8.48 m)
- Wingspan: 41 ft 0 in (12.50 m)
- Powerplant: 1 × Wright-Hisso E-4 , 200 hp (150 kW)
- Propellers: 2-bladed

Performance

- Maximum speed: 112 mph (180 km/h, 97 kn)
- Service ceiling: 19,000 ft (5,800 m)

== See also ==
Related lists

- List of United States Navy aircraft designations (pre-1962)
