= Manzolini =

Manzolini is a surname. Notable people with the surname include:

- Anna Morandi Manzolini (1714–1774), Italian anatomist, anatomical wax modeler, and lecturer
- Giovanni Manzolini (1700–1755), Italian professor and anatomical wax modeler, husband of the above
