= Marquart MA-5 Charger =

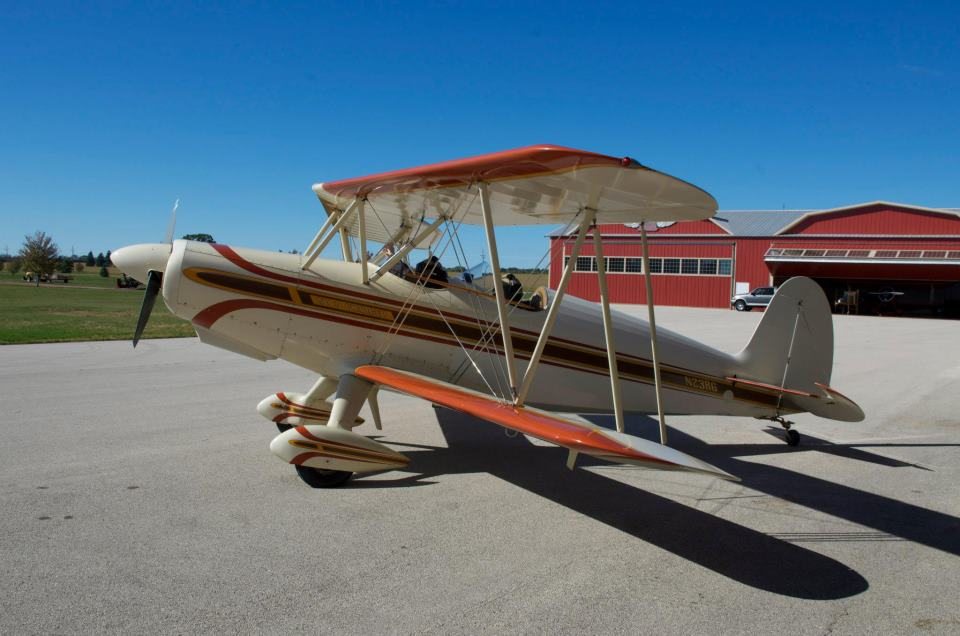
- Remo Galeazzi's Grand Champion Marquart Charger

General information
- Type: Homebuilt aircraft
- National origin: United States of America
- Designer: Ed Marquart

History
- First flight: October 1970
- Developed from: Marquart MA-4

The Marquart MA-5 Charger is a homebuilt two place biplane.

== Design and development ==
The MA-5 Charger was designed and developed by Ed Marquart with the first prototype being built and flown by Daniel W. Fielder Jr. at Flabob Airport. It is an all-new design based around Marquart's single place homebuilt biplane, the MA-4. The aircraft was designed to perform mild aerobatics. Marquart sold plans for scratch building the aircraft, no kits were manufactured. For a number of years, Ken Brock offered kits of the metal brackets utilized in the construction of the Charger's wings and fuselage.

The aircraft uses a welded steel tube fuselage with doped aircraft fabric covering. The wings use wooden spars and ribs. The biplane uses conventional landing gear and has two tandem open cockpits. The wings are constant chord and swept 10 degrees.

The first prototype took seven years to build.

Since Ed Marquart's death in 2007, the plans have been placed in the public domain, and are available as free PDF files via the Marquart Charger MA-5 website, or the Charger groups on either Facebook or groups.io (formerly Yahoo).

== Operational history ==
In 1982, Jim Smith's Marquart Charger won Grand Champion Plans-built Aircraft at the EAA AirVenture Oshkosh airshow.

In 1987, Remo Galeazzi's Marquart Charger won Grand Champion Plans-built Aircraft at the EAA AirVenture Oshkosh airshow.

In 1991, builder and pilot Dave Davidson became the oldest pilot to fly solo across the Atlantic in his Marquart Charger at the age of 70. The aircraft was retrofitted with two drop-tanks mounted between the landing gear.

In 2009, Mark Gilmore's Marquart Charger won Grand Champion Plans-built Aircraft at the EAA AirVenture Oshkosh airshow.

In 2015, Ken Orloff's Marquart Charger won "Grand Champion Plans-built Aircraft" at EAA AirVenture Oshkosh.

== Specifications (Marquart MA-5 Charger) ==
Data from Plane and Pilot

General characteristics

- Crew: 1
- Capacity: 2
- Length: 19 ft 6 in (5.94 m)
- Wingspan: 24 ft (7.3 m)
- Upper wingspan: 24 ft (7.3 m)
- Lower wingspan: 24 ft (7.3 m)
- Height: 7 ft 6 in (2.29 m)
- Wing area: 170 sq ft (16 m^{2})
- Empty weight: 1,000 lb (454 kg)
- Gross weight: 1,550 lb (703 kg)
- Powerplant: 1 × Lycoming O-290 125 HP horizontally opposed gasoline engine

Performance

- Cruise speed: 100 kn (115 mph, 185 km/h)
- Stall speed: 33 kn (38 mph, 61 km/h)
- g limits: +6/-4 G
- Rate of climb: 1,100 ft/min (5.6 m/s)
- Wing loading: 9.4 lb/sq ft (46 kg/m^{2})
