= Aviatika-MAI-890 =

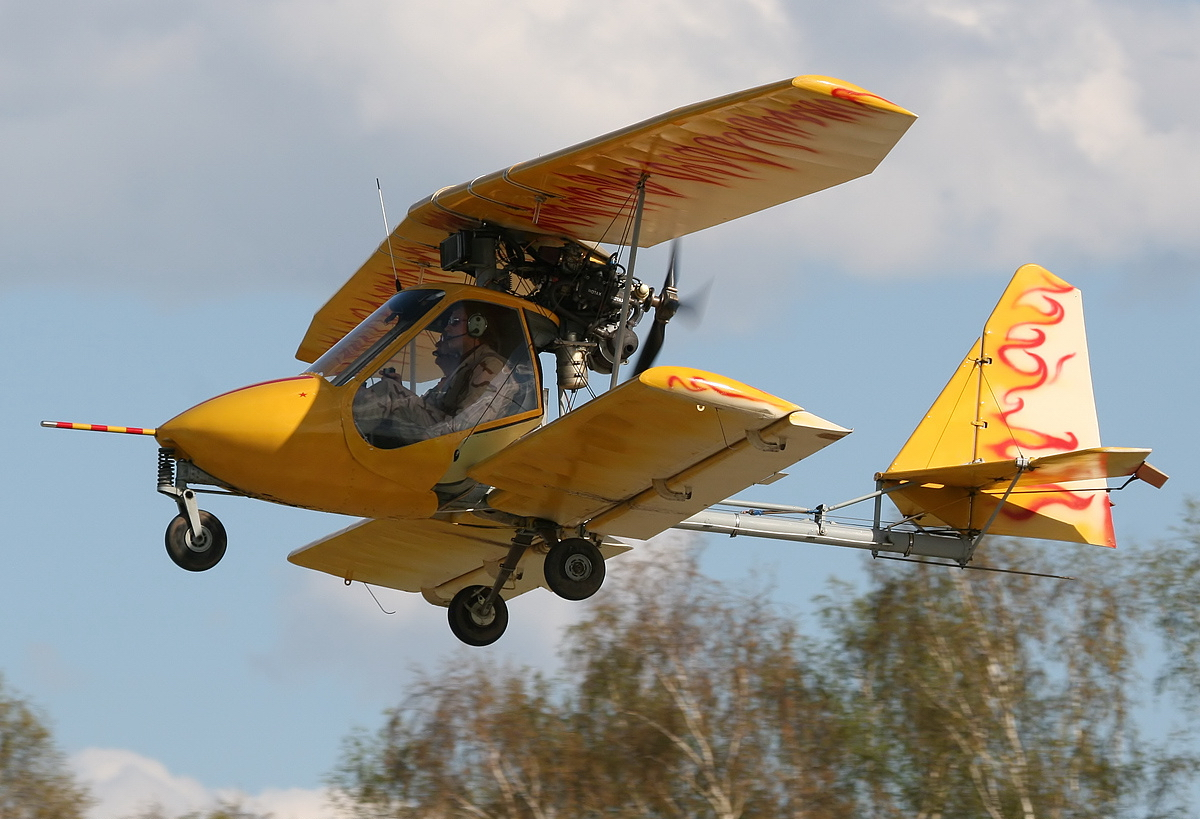
- Aviatika-MAI 890U

General information
- Type: 1 or 2 seat ultralight
- National origin: Russia
- Manufacturer: RSK 'MiG'
- Status: In production (2015)
- Number built: More than 300 by 2006

History
- Introduction date: 1991
- First flight: July 1987

The Aviatika-MAI-890 is a pod-and-boom, pusher configuration biplane ultralight designed and built by the Moscow Aviation Institute (MAI) in Russia in the 1980s. As well as being a sport and training aircraft, significant numbers have been used for agricultural spraying. It remained in production in 2015.

== Design and development ==
The MAI-890 design originated and was developed by the Experimental Aircraft design section, known as OSKBES, of the School of Aeronautics at the MAI. From about 1990 the MAI design bureau became part of the Aviatika joint-stock company to facilitate aircraft production, so that for much of the 1990s the 890 was an Aviatika product. In 1998 MAI acquired the production rights from Aviatika and marketed it as the Aviatika-MAI-890. The starting point was the open cockpit, short span Junior which appeared in 1987 and developed into the full-span, enclosed seat prototype MAI-89 in 1989. The production prototype, designated MAI-890, followed the next year and production began in 1991. Since then two seat and agricultural versions have been produced.

The MAI-890 has a structure of mixed aluminium, titanium and steel alloys and is fabric covered. It is an unequal span biplane with a straight lower wing of constant chord and some dihedral, which carries full span ailerons. The upper wing has greater span, some sweep but no dihedral, with constant chord over much of its span but with taper on the outer panels. It is a single bay biplane with one, slender interplane strut on each side assisted by flying wires; at its centre, the upper wing is fixed to the underwing engine mounting. Enclosed single or side-by-side seating is positioned ahead of the lower wing leading edge. A slender boom from the bottom of the fuselage pod carries the empennage; all tail surfaces are straight edged and strongly tapered and have generous control areas, with ground-adjustable trim tabs on the elevators.

All current MAI-890 are powered by Rotax engines mounted in pusher configuration, the type depending on the aircraft variant and option. It has a short-legged, fixed tricycle undercarriage with cantilever main legs attached the boom behind the cabin.

== Operational history ==
More than 300 aircraft were reported sold by 2006, about 60 of them agricultural variants, about 30 exported to South Africa. 26 MAI-89s and -890s appeared in the civil aircraft registers of European countries outside Russia in mid-2010.

== Variants ==
Data from Jane's All the World's Aircraft 2011/12

Junior
Open cockpit single seater with short span (5.68 m; 18 ft 7.5 in); maximum take-off weight (MTOW) 282 kg (617 lb). First flew July 1987.
MAI-89
longer span (8.11 m; 26 ft 7.5 in); MTOW 340 kg (750 lb). Flown 1989.
MAI-890
Production version, flown 1990 and produced from 1991 with interruption in mid-1990s but with a 2002 statement that production continued. Single seater.
MAI-890U
Two side-by-side seats. First flown August 1991 with 48 kW (64 hp) Rotax 582 UL engine; standard engine, first flown 16 September 1992, is the Rotax 912 UL. MTOW 540 kg (1,190 lb). Floatplane version tested 2000.
Aviatika-MAI-890SKh Farmer
Single seat, MAI-890 based, Rotax 912 ULS or Rotax 582 powered crop-spraying version, with a spraybar aft of the lower wing s fed from a tank below the engine.
Aviatika-MAI-890USKh
Two seat, MAI-890U based crop-spraying version.
Aviatika-MAI-890S
South African designation of prototype converted to Rotax 912 ULS; in Russian terms a MAI-890.
980U Mai
South African name for MAI-890U.
980CSH Mai
South African name for agricultural version.

== Specifications (890USKh crop-sprayer, Rotax 912 ULS engine) ==
Data from Jane's All the World's Aircraft 2011/12

General characteristics

- Crew: 2
- Length: 5.32 m (17 ft 5 in) including long nose mounted pitot
- Upper wingspan: 8.11 m (26 ft 7 in)
- Height: 2.25 m (7 ft 5 in) to fin tip
- Wing area: 14.29 m^{2} (153.8 sq ft) gross
- Empty weight: 350 kg (772 lb)
- Max takeoff weight: 540 kg (1,190 lb)
- Fuel capacity: 50 L (13.2 US gal; 11.0 Imp gal)
- Powerplant: 1 × Rotax 912 ULS air- and liquid-cooled flat-four, 73.5 kW (98.6 hp)
- Propellers: 2-bladed VV-98E-11

Performance

- Maximum speed: 110 km/h (68 mph, 59 kn)
- Cruise speed: 100 km/h (62 mph, 54 kn) maximum
- Endurance: 2 h 53 mim
- g limits: +5/-2.5
- Rate of climb: 2.1 m/s (410 ft/min) maximum at sea level
- Take-off run: 90 m (295 ft)
- Landing run: 150 m (495 ft)
