= Mauboussin M.200 =

Mauboussin M-200
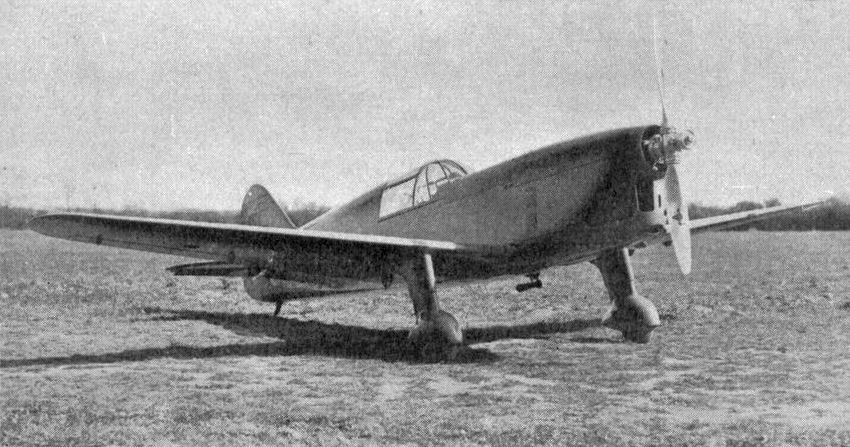

General information
- Type: Racing monoplane
- Manufacturer: Fouga
- Number built: 3

History
- First flight: 21 March 1939

The Mauboussin M.200 was a French racing monoplane built by Fouga. It was a low-wing cantilever monoplane with a fixed tailskid landing gear. It had an enclosed cockpit for a pilot, and was powered by a Régnier 85.8 kW (115 hp) 4E.0 engine. It first flew on 21 March 1939, and in May 1939 established new FAI records for an aircraft of its class.

== Variants ==
M.200
The first prototype of a single-seat training / racing aircraft, powered by a 71 kW (95 hp) Régnier 4E.0 inverted air-cooled in-line piston engine, first flown on 21 March 1939.
M.201
A second airframe produced and supposed to be powered by a 110 kW (150 hp) Régnier 4E.0.
M.202
A second flyable prototype which might use the airframe of M.201 powered by a 71 kW (95 hp) Régnier 4E.0, first flown in June 1941.

== Specifications ==
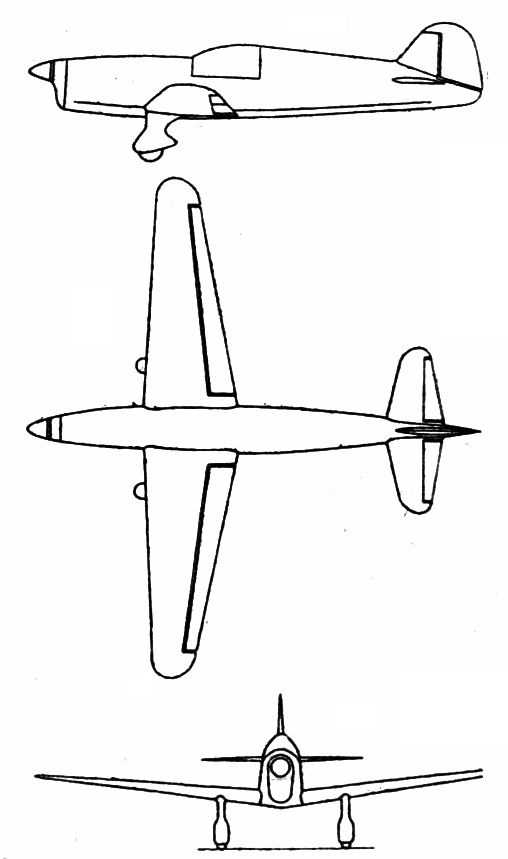
Mauboussin M.202 3-view drawing from L'Aerophile July 1942

Data from

General characteristics

- Length: 6.92 m (22 ft 8 in)
- Wingspan: 7.28 m (23 ft 11 in)
- Height: 2.25 m (7 ft 5 in)
- Wing area: 7.5 m^{2} (81 sq ft)
- Empty weight: 370 kg (816 lb)
- Gross weight: 578 kg (1,274 lb)
- Powerplant: 1 × Régnier 4Eo 4-cyl. air-cooled inverted in-line piston engine, 71 kW (95 hp)

Performance

- Maximum speed: 285 km/h (177 mph, 154 kn)
- Range: 1,000 km (620 mi, 540 nmi)
- Service ceiling: 6,000 m (20,000 ft)

== Bibliography ==
- Parmentier, Bruno. "Mauboussin M-200" (in French).
- Parmentier, Bruno. "Mauboussin M-201" (in French).
- Parmentier, Bruno. "Mauboussin M-202" (in French).
- The Illustrated Encyclopedia of Aircraft (Part Work 1982-1985), 1985, Orbis Publishing, Page 2435
