= Martin XB-68 =

American bomber project

General information
- Type: Tactical bomber
- National origin: United States
- Manufacturer: Glenn L. Martin Company
- Status: Design stage only
- Number built: 0

The Martin XB-68 was a supersonic medium tactical bomber with a crew of two that was proposed in 1954 to the United States Air Force. The project, however, was canceled before any aircraft were built.

== Design and development ==
The Glenn L. Martin Company submitted design studies in response to the Weapon System 302A requirement in 1952 in competition with proposals from Douglas Aircraft Company and North American Aviation, Inc. Revised designs were presented again in 1954. The Boeing Airplane Company also submitted a design after the competition date had passed and was automatically rejected. The Martin 316 was declared the winner in 1956 and received the designation XB-68. Deployment was projected for the 1962-1965 period.

With a conventional layout that somewhat resembled a scaled-up Lockheed F-104, the XB-68 was to have been primarily of steel construction, with the crew of a pilot-radio operator and navigator-bombardier defense systems operator in a pressurized compartment, to be cooled by filtered bleed-air from the engines, and a refrigeration unit for evaporative cooling at high Mach numbers. The B-68 would have had stubby diamond-shaped wings and a raked T-tail empennage. It was intended to be operated at supersonic speeds at medium and high altitudes.

The design immediately ran into serious difficulties over the inertial guidance bombing and navigation system, which, had the bomber been approved for production, would have pushed deployment back to at least 1963. The problems were rendered moot when Air Force headquarters cancelled the project in 1957, citing stringent budget limitations and higher priorities for other weapon systems. Recognizing that the medium tactical bomber design was still years away, plans were carried forward instead to continue using an Air Force version of the Navy's Douglas A3D, which was designated B-66 Destroyer. Two planned XB-68 prototypes and one static test model were cancelled, and none were built.

The chosen power plant was two Pratt & Whitney J75 (JT4B-21) axial-flow turbojets of 27,500 lbf (122 kN) static sea level thrust each with afterburner, providing a maximum speed of 1,588 mph (1,380 kn; 2,556 km/h) at 54,700 ft (16,700 m) altitude at maximum power and a combat speed of 1,534 mph (1,333 kn; 2,469 km/h) at 42,200 ft (12,900 m) altitude at maximum power. Combat range was planned for 1,250 mi (1,090 nmi; 2,010 km) with 3,700 lb (1,700 kg) payload at 526 kn (974 km/h) average speed in 4.15 hours.

== Specifications (as designed) ==
General characteristics

- Crew: two: pilot and bombardier/navigator
- Length: 109 ft 8 in (33.43 m)
- Wingspan: 53 ft 0 in (16.2 m)
- Height: 25 ft 6 in (7.77 m)
- Wing area: 875 sq ft (81.3 m^{2})
- Empty weight: 53,925 lb (24,460 kg)
- Gross weight: 74,180 lb (33,650 kg)
- Max takeoff weight: 102,720 lb (46,590 kg)
- Powerplant: 2 × Pratt & Whitney JT4B-21 turbojet, 27,500 lbf (122 kN) thrust each

Performance

- Maximum speed: 1,593 mph (2,564 km/h, 1,384 kn)
- Range: 3,051 mi (4,910 km, 2,651 nmi)
- Service ceiling: 44,800 ft (13,650 m)
- Rate of climb: 500 ft/min (25 m/s)
- Wing loading: 85 lb/sq ft (414 kg/m^{2})
- Thrust/weight: 0.74

Armament

- Guns: 1× 20 mm (0.79 in) M61 Vulcan rotary cannon with 1,100 rounds in tail
- Bombs:
  - 1× Class C nuclear bomb or
  - 1× Class D nuclear bomb

== See also ==
Related lists

- List of bomber aircraft
- List of military aircraft of the United States
