= Le Mesnil-Esnard =

- Commune
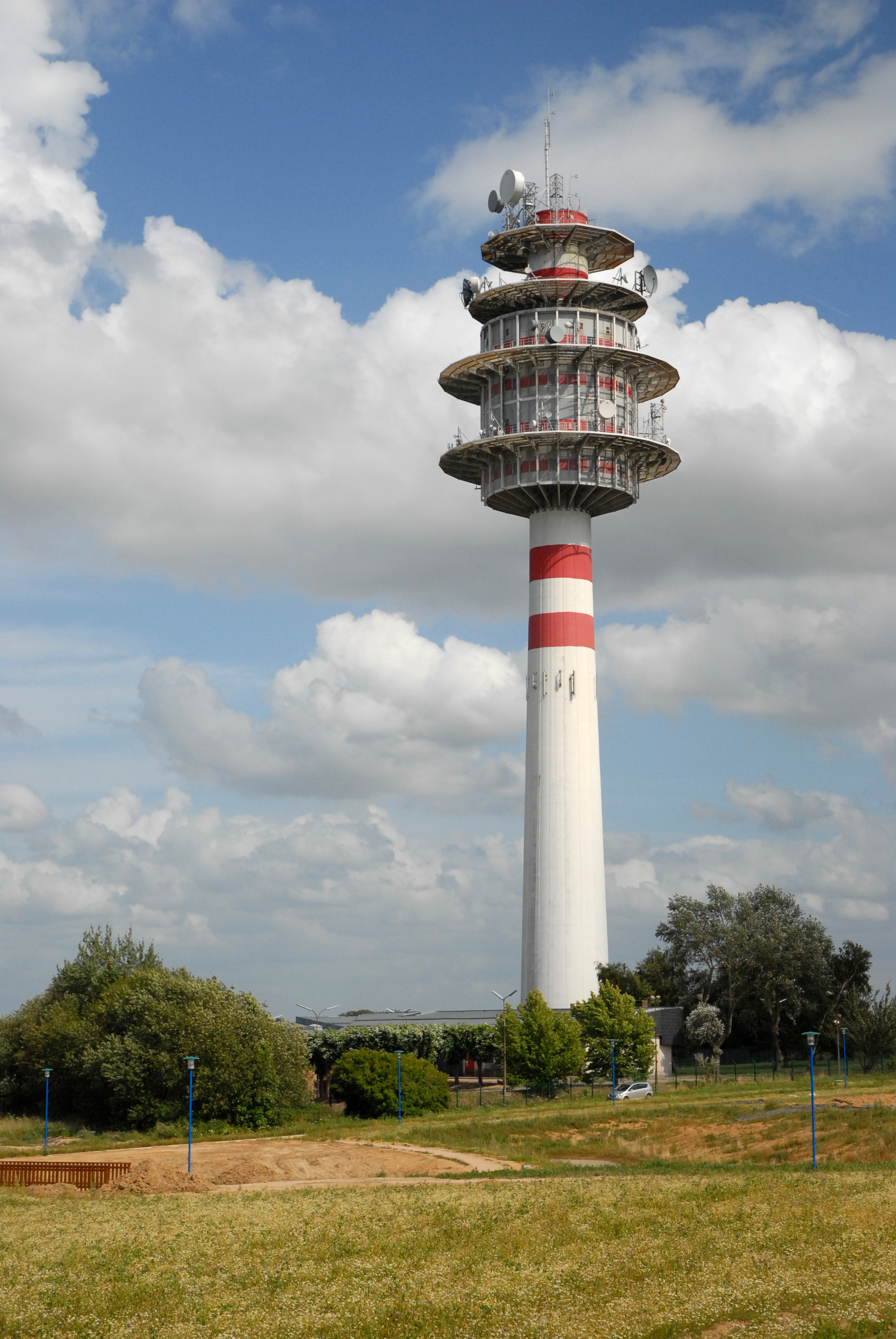
- The radio tower in Le Mesnil-Esnard
- Location of Le Mesnil-Esnard
- Location within France Location within Normandy
- Coordinates: 49°24′42″N 1°08′34″E
- Country: France
- Region: Normandy
- Department: Seine-Maritime
- Arrondissement: Rouen
- Canton: Le Mesnil-Esnard
- Intercommunality: Métropole Rouen Normandie

Government
  - Mayor (2020–2026): Jean-Marc Vennin
- Area^{1}: 5.07 km^{2} (1.96 sq mi)
- Elevation: 150 m (490 ft)
- Highest elevation: 162 m (531 ft)
- Lowest elevation: 65 m (213 ft)
- Population (2023): 8,177
  - Density: 1,610/km^{2} (4,180/sq mi)
- Time zone: UTC+01:00 (CET)
  - Summer (DST): UTC+02:00 (CEST)
- INSEE/Postal code: 76429 /76240
- ^{1} French Land Register data, which excludes lakes, ponds, glaciers > 1 km^{2} (0.386 sq mi or 247 acres) and river estuaries.

Le Mesnil-Esnard (French pronunciation: [lə menil enaʁ]) is a commune in the Seine-Maritime department in the Normandy region in northern France.

== Geography ==
A small suburban town of light industry and farming, situated just 3 miles (4.8 km) southeast of the centre of Rouen at the junction of the D6015 and the D138 roads.

== Population ==
Historical population
Year	Pop.	±% p.a.
1968	2,726	—
1975	3,885	+5.19%
1982	5,076	+3.89%
1990	6,092	+2.31%
1999	6,486	+0.70%
2007	6,692	+0.39%
2012	7,478	+2.25%
2017	7,967	+1.27%
2023	8,177	+0.43%
Source: INSEE

== Places of interest ==
- The church of Notre-Dame, dating from the seventeenth century.

== See also ==
- Communes of the Seine-Maritime department
