= List of aircraft (O) =

This is a list of aircraft in alphabetical order beginning with 'O'.

== O ==
=== O'Bannon ===
(Clyde & Ralph O'Bannon, 510 S Kenilworth Ave, Oak Park, IL)

- O'Bannon 31

=== O'Brien-Hudson ===
- See Hudson & O'Brien

=== O'Hara ===
(Robert O'Hara, San Fernando, CA)

- O'Hara 1977 Biplane

=== O'Malley ===
(Thomas H O'Malley, N E Warren, OH)

- O'Malley 1 Pterodactyl

=== O'Neil ===
(O'Neil Airplane Co, Carlyle, IL)

- O'Neill Magnum

=== O'Neill ===
(Terrence O'Neill, Ft Wayne, IN)

- O'Neill Aristocraft II
- O'Neill Model W
- O'Neill Pea Pod

=== Oakland ===
(Oakland Airmotive Co, Oakland, CA)

- Oakland Centaurus

=== OAW ===
(Ostdeutsche Albatroswerke G.m.b.H.)

- see:Albatros OAW

=== Oaxaca ===
(Oaxaca Aerospace / Raul and Rodrigo Fernandez)

- Oaxaca PE-210A Pegasus

=== Ochoa ===
(V L Ochoa, Arlington, NJ)

- Ochoa Jersey Devil a.k.a. Jersey Mosquito

=== Oberlerchner ===
(Josef Oberlerchner Holzindustrie / Ing. Fritz Birkner)

- Oberlerchner JOB 5
- Oberlerchner JOB 15
- Oberlerchner Mg 23

=== Odesaviaremservice ===
- Odesaviaremservice C-9 Dolphin

=== Odier ===
(Antoine Odier - see: ESTA)

=== Oeffag ===
( Österreichische Flugzeugfabrik AG)

- Note: Öffag were allocated 50 series numbers for experimental and prototype aircraft.
- Oeffag 50.01
- Oeffag 50.02
- Oeffag 50.03 (C.II)
- Oeffag 50.04
- Oeffag 50.05
- Oeffag 50.06 (C.II)
- Oeffag 50.07 (C.II)
- Oeffag 50.08 (AF)
- Oeffag 50.09 (AF)
- Oeffag 50.10 (AF)
- Oeffag 50.11 (AF)
- Oeffag 50.12 (AF)
- Oeffag 50.13 (BF)
- Oeffag 50.14 (CF)
- Oeffag 50.15
- Oeffag series 51 (C.I)
- Oeffag series 52 (C.II)
  - Oeffag series 52.5 (C.II)
- Oeffag series 53 (Albatros D.II(Oef))
- Oeffag series 53.2 (Albatros D.III(Oef))
- Oeffag series 153 (Albatros D.III(Oef))
- Oeffag series 253 (Albatros D.III(Oef))
- Oeffag series 54 (Friedrichshafen G.IIIa(Oef))
- Oeffag Va.53
- Oeffag Va.53.2
- Oeffag Va.153
- Oeffag Va.253
- Oeffag AF
- Oeffag BF
- Oeffag CF
- Oeffag G
- Oeffag H
- Oeffag K (Hansa-Brandenburg W.13 (Oef))
- Oeffag KG
- Oeffag C.I
- Oeffag C.II

=== Offierski ===
(Michael Offierski)

- Offierski O.2

=== Offpiste Limited ===
(Dursley, Gloucestershire, United Kingdom)

- Offpiste Discovery

=== OFW ===
(Österreichische Flugzeugwerke GmbH / Ing. Otto Kauba)

- OFW OK-15

=== Oertz ===
(Max Oertz)

- Oertz 1909 biplane
- 1911 Oertz monoplane
- Oertz Taube IV
- Oertz V 5 Miltär Eindekker
- Oertz W 4
- Oertz W 5
- Oertz W 6 Flugschoner
- Oertz W 8

=== Ogawa ===
(Saburo Ogawa)

- Ogawa No.1
- Ogawa No.2
- Ogawa No.3 Taxi-ing Trainer
- Ogawa No.5

=== Ogden ===
((Henry H & Perry V) Ogden Aeronautical Corp, 1119 S Market St, Inglewood, CA)

- Ogden Osprey C a.k.a. PC
- Ogden Osprey PB a.k.a. Pirate
- Ogden Osprey PC a.k.a. C
- Ogden Pirate a.k.a. PB

=== ÕGL ===
(Õhu- ja Gaasikaitse Liit - Air & Aircraft Workshop) Tallinn, Estonia

- ÕGL-1 Kai
- ÕGL-2
- ÕGL POD-1
- ÕGL PON-1
- ÕGL PON-1A
- LKOD KOD-1 13 PON-1 license-built in Latvia by LKOD - Kara Ostas Darbnica
- ÕGL PON-2
- ÕGL PN-3
- ÕGL PTO-4

=== Oguri ===
(Tsunetaro Oguri)

- Oguri-Curtiss Jenny Trainer
- Oguri No.2

=== Ohio ===
(Ohio Aero Mfg Co (Pres: Judd Yoho), Youngstown, OH)

- Ohio Airmaster Coupe
- Ohio Youngster

=== Ohio ===
(Ohio Aviation Research & Development Foundation)

- Ohio 1950s Monoplane

=== Ohm & Stoppelbein ===
(Richard Ohm and Gordon Stoppelbein, McLean, VA)

- Ohm & Stoppelbei Special

=== OIC ===
(Owj Industrial Complex, Iran)

- OIC Tazarv

=== Okamura ===
(Okamura Seiskujo Kabushiki Kaisha - Okamura Manufacturing Company Limited)

- Okamura N-52

=== Okay ===
(Okay Airplane Co, Okay, OK (Pres: C N Martin))

- Okay SK-1

=== OKB-1 ===
- OKB-1 EF 131
- OKB-1 EF 132
- OKB-1 EF 137
- OKB-1 140
- OKB-1 150

=== Olagnier ===
(Rémy Olagnier)

- Olagnier 01

=== Oldfield ===
(Barney Oldfield Aircraft Co, Cleveland, OH)

- Oldfield Baby Lakes

=== Oldtimer ===
- Oldtimer M-17 Double Decker

=== Oleson ===
(Clifton P "Ole" Oleson, IA)

- Oleson 1921 Biplane

=== Oleson ===
((Tage C and Uffe K) Oleson Aircraft Inc, Wayne, MI)

- Oleson OM-1 Connecticut Yankee

=== Ollivier ===
(Charles Ollivier)

- Ollivier DR.100 Collivier

=== Olsen ===
(Olsen Standard Aeroplane Co (OSACO), Tomahawk, WI)

- Curtiss-OSACO
- Olsen 1927 Monoplane
- OSACO 6

=== Olsen ===
(Gordon L Olsen, Rosamond, CA)

- Olsen Nite Hawk
- Olsen Nite Star

=== Olsen-Jonasson ===
(Olsen-Jonasson)

- Olsen-Jonasson Ognin

=== Olsen-Thomas ===
((Albert & Lars) Olsen-(Ward) Thomas, Middletown, NJ)

- Olsen-Thomas Parasol XP1-40

=== Olson ===
(Olson Aircraft Corp, Wilmington, NC)

- Olson Ambassador

=== Olympic Ultralights ===
(Port Angeles, WA)

- Olympic Desert Eagle

=== OMA SUD ===
(OMA SUD SpA, Capua (CE), Italy)

- OMA SUD Redbird
- OMA SUD Skycar

=== OMAC ===
(Old Man's Aircraft Company - OMAC Inc, Reno, NV)

- OMAC Laser 300
- OMAC-1

=== OMAREAL ===
(Officina de Manutenção e Recuperção de Avioes, Ltda.)

- OMAREAL Casmuniz 52
- OMAREAL W-141

=== Omega ===
(Omega Aircraft Corp)

- Omega BS-12
- Omega BS-12B
- Omega BS-12D-1
- Omega BS-12D-3
- Omega BS-12F
- Omega BS-12J
- Omega BS-14 Falcon
- Omega BS-17A Airliner

=== OMF ===
(Ostmecklenburgische Flugzeugbau)

- OMF-100-160 Symphony

=== Omni Weld ===
(Omni-Weld Company)

- Omni Weld Questor

=== On Mark Engineering ===
- On Mark Executive
- On Mark Marketeer
- On Mark Marksman

=== Onciul ===
(Radu Onciul)

- Onciul R.O.-1
- Onciul R.O.-2

=== OneAircraft ===
(Celje, Slovenia)

- OneAircraft One

=== One Aviation ===
(Albuquerque, NM)

- Eclipse 550
- Eclipse 700
- Kestrel K-350

=== ONERA ===
(Office National d'Études et de Recherches Aérospatiales)

- ONERA Deltaviex

=== Ong ===
((William) Ong Aircraft Corp, 838 Richards Rd, Kansas City, MO)

- Ong M-32-W Continental

=== Onishi ===
- Onishi OSG3

=== Orliński ===
(Roman Orliński)

- Orliński RO-7 Orlik

=== Orta St. Hubert ===
(St.Hubert Aircraft Engineering Works - Mr. Pierre Baudoux and Mr. Jose Orta)

- Orta-St.Hubert G.1
- Orta-St.Hubert SG.1
- Orta-St.Hubert 135BO

=== OOS ===
(Otdel Opytnogo Samolyetostroeniya - section for experimental aircraft construction)

- OOS Stal-2
- OOS Stal-3
- OOS Stal-5
- OOS Stal-11
- OOS Aviatourist
- OOS KhB

=== Opel ===
(Fritz von Opel)

- Opel RAK.1 (a.k.a. Opel-Hatry RAK.1 or Opel-Sander RAK.1)

=== Opener, Inc. ===
(Palo Alto, California, United States)

- Opener BlackFly

=== OpenSky ===
- OpenSky M-02

=== Öppulennuk ===
()

- Öppulennuk PTO-4

=== Optery X ===
(Optery X Engineering Ltd.)

- Optery X MXIII

=== Option Air ===
(Option Air Reno (Pres: Carl O. Barlow), Reno, NV)

- Option Air Acapella 100-L
- Option Air Acapella 200-L
- Option Air Acapella 200-S

=== Oravecz ===
(Béla Oravecz)

- Oravecz-1
- Oravecz-2

=== Orbital Sciences Corporation ===
- Orbital Sciences X-34

=== Orel ===
(Orel Aircraft)

- Orel VH2 Streamline

=== Orenco ===
(Ordnance Engineering Co, Long Island, NY)

- Orenco A
- Orenco B
- Orenco C
- Orenco C-4 Cross Country
- Orenco D
- Orenco D-2
- Orenco E-2
- Orenco F
- Orenco F-4 Tourister
- Orenco H-2
- Orenco H-3 Commercial
- Orenco I Sport Boat
- Orenco IL-1
- Orenco PT
- Orenco PW-1
- Orenco PW-1A
- Orenco PW-3

=== Orlando Helicopter Airways ===
(Orlando Helicopter Airways, Inc, DeLand, FL)

- Orlando Deland Travel Air 2000

=== Orličan ===
(Orlican Národní Podnik)

- Orličan L-40 Meta Sokol
- Orlican VSO 10
- Orlican VT-16 Orlik
- Orlican VT-116 Orlik
- Orličan Ornis M7

=== Orlogsværftet / Flyvetroppernes Værksteder ===
(Orlogsværftet / Flyvetroppernes Værksteder - Naval dockyard / Flying Corps’ workshops)

- Orlogsvaerftet HM.I
- Orlogsvaerftet HM.II
- Orlogsvaerftet H.B.I
- Orlogsvaerftet H.B.II
- Orlogsvaerftet L.B.I
- Orlogsvaerftet L.B.II
- Orlogsvaerftet L.B.IV
- Orlogsvaerftet L.B.V
- Orlogsvaerftet L.M.I
- Orlogsvaerftet Mågen 17
- Orlogsvaerftet F.B.II
- Orlogsvaerftet F.B.III
- Orlogsvaerftet F.B.IV
- Orlogsvaerftet F.B.V
- Tøjhusværkstederne- Orlogsværftet H-Maskine

=== Orme ===
(Harry A Orme, Washington, DC)

- Orme 1908 Biplane

=== Orel Aircraft ===
(Selles-Saint-Denis, France)

- Orel VH2 Streamline

=== Ort ===
(Daniel J Ort, Dearborn/Detroit, MI)

- Ort Sport

=== Orta St.Hubert ===
(José Orta / Ecole d'Aviation de St. Hubert

- Orta St Hubert SG.1
- Orta St.Hubert G.1

=== Ortego ===
(Leo Ortego, Alexandria, LA)

- Ortego Helicopter

=== ORYOL-FESTIP ===
- ORYOL-FESTIP Concept Plane

=== OSA ===
(Officine Sommese Aeronautica)

- O.S.A. 135
- O.S.A. 200

=== OSKBES ===
(Moscow Aviation institute)

- MAI-223
- MAI-208
- MAI-890
- MAI-920

=== Osprey ===
(George Pereira / Osprey Aircraft)

- Osprey GP-4
- Osprey GP-5

=== Ostergaard ===
(Ostergaard Airplane Works, Chicago, IL)

- Ostergaard 1919 Aeroplane

=== OSU ===
(Ohio State University, Columbus, OH)

- OSU PG-I

=== Ott ===
(Delmar Ott, Napa, CA)

- Ott V-2 Special

=== Otto ===
(Gustav Otto Flugmaschinenfabrik (from 1911) / Aeroplanbau Otto-Alberti (1910))

- Otto-Alberti Doppeldecker (based on a Farman biplane 1910)
- Otto Renn-Doppeldecker (1912)
- Otto M 1912 (a.k.a. Pusher Biplane)
- Otto B 1914
- Otto C
- Otto B.I
- Otto C.I 1915
- Otto C.II
- Otto W.II

=== Otto ===
(Otto Aviation Group LLC)

- Otto Celera 500L

=== Oulette ===
(Albert Oulette, Sanford, ME)

- Oulette 1910 Biplane

=== Overcashier ===
((Francis) Overcashier Airplane Co, 3515 Woodward, Detroit, MI)

- Overcashier JN-4
- Overcashier O-12
- Overcashier Special

=== Overland ===
(Overland Airways Inc, Omaha, NE)

- Overland Model L
- Overland Sport 60

=== OWAM ===
(Oscar Wittenstein Aerodrom Milbertshofen - Dr. Otto Wittenstein)

- OWAM 1911 Eindecker

=== Owens ===
(John Sidney Owens, Glenside, PA)

- Owens 1929 Biplane
- Owens 3-B-1

=== Owj Industrial Complex ===
- Owj Tazarve

=== Owl ===
(George Owl, Gardena, CA)

- Owl Racer OR-65-2 Pogo and Yellow peril
- Owl Racer OR-70-1 Fang
- Owl Racer OR-71-1 Li'l Quickie

=== Ozaki ===
(Yukiteru Ozaki)

- Ozaki Tractor Biplane
- Ozaki Soga-go

=== Ozone Gliders ===
(Le Bar-sur-Loup, France)

- Ozone 6907
- Ozone Addict
- Ozone Alpina
- Ozone Atom
- Ozone Buzz
- Ozone Cosmic Rider
- Ozone Delta
- Ozone Element
- Ozone Enzo
- Ozone FLX
- Ozone Geo
- Ozone Groundhog
- Ozone Jomo
- Ozone LM4
- Ozone LM5
- Ozone LM6
- Ozone Mac Daddy Bi
- Ozone Magnum
- Ozone Mag2lite
- Ozone Mantra
- Ozone Mojo
- Ozone Octane
- Ozone Peak
- Ozone Proton
- Ozone Rush
- Ozone Swift
- Ozone Swiftmax
- Ozone Trickster
- Ozone Ultralite
- Ozone Vibe
- Ozone Vulcan
- Ozone XXLite
- Ozone Zeno
