= Putilov =

Putilov may refer to

- Putilov (surname)
- Putilov Stal-2 aircraft
- Putilov Stal-3 aircraft
- Putilov Stal-5 aircraft
- Putilov Stal-11 aircraft
- Garford-Putilov Armoured Car
- The Putilov Strike of 1917 in Petrograd, Russia
- Kirov Plant, previously known as Putilov Plant
