= Putilov (surname) =

Putilov (Russian: Путилов) is a Russian masculine surname, its feminine counterpart is Putilova. It may refer to

- Alexander Putilov (born 1952), Russian businessman
- Aleksei Putilov (1866–1940), Russian banker and industrialist
- Nikolay Putilov (1820-1880), Russian industrialist
