= IL-1 =

IL1 or IL-1 may refer to:

- Interleukin 1, a protein
- Illinois's 1st congressional district
- Illinois Route 1
- IL1, Building 1 of Infinite Loop (street), the headquarters of Apple Inc.
- Orenco IL-1, 1921 American two-seat liaison biplane
- Ilyushin Il-1, a 1944 Soviet fighter prototype
