= Desert Eagle (disambiguation) =

The Desert Eagle is a gas-operated semi-automatic pistol.

Desert Eagle may also refer to:

- Desert Eagle (album), a 2002 album by C-Bo
- Desert Eagle Volume 1, a 2008 album by Sole
- Desert Eagle Observatory, an amateur observatory in Arizona, United States
- Olympic Desert Eagle, an American homebuilt aircraft
- "Desert Eagle", a 2024 song by Beyoncé from her album Cowboy Carter
