= Alexander Djaparidze =

Georgian businessman

- Born: 20 July 1955 (age 71); Dagestan Autonomous Soviet Socialist Republic, Soviet Union
- Education: Gubkin Russian State University of Oil and Gas Doctorate of Science
- Known for: Eurasia Drilling Company Limited; US$1.2 billion(April 2020); US$1 billion(March 2019); US$1.6 billion(March 2018); US$1.3 billion(March 2017); US$1.2 billion(March 2016); US$1.5 billion(March 2015); US$2.1 billion(March 2014); US$1.8 billion(March 2012)
- Spouse: married
- Children: 5

Alexander Dzhaparidze (Georgian: ალექსანდრე ჯაფარიძე) (born 20 July 1955, Makhachkala, Dagestan Autonomous Soviet Socialist Republic, Soviet Union) is a Russian-Georgian businessman based in London.

== Biography ==
Dzhaparidze is former owner of the PetroAlliance Services Company Limited, Russia's largest independent oilfield services company.

Dzhaparidze founded and chaired Eurasia Drilling Company Limited. Schlumberger attempted to acquire EDC in 2015 and in 2018, but the acquisition was blocked by Russian Anti-Monopoly Service (FAS). In 2022, Dzhaparidze exited all Russian assets, including OOO BKE.

In 2020, Forbes estimated Dzhaparidze's net worth to be US$1.2 billion and ranked him, 1730th on the list of world billionaires.

In 2015, his company Soma Oil and Gas was probed by the British government for bribes in the acquisition of oil extraction rights in Somalia. The investigation was closed in 2016.

== Activities ==
- Chairman of the Board of Directors of OOO BKE 2005-March 2022
- CEO of Eurasia Drilling Company.
- President of PetroAlliance Service Company
- Executive BoD Chairman of PetroAlliance Service Company
- Managing Director of JV MD SEIS
