= Alexander Putilov =

Czech businessman

- Born: January 1, 1952 (age 74); Tyumen
- Citizenship: Czech
- Education: B.A. & B.Sc
- Alma mater: Tyumen Industrial Institute
- Occupation: Businessperson
- Organization: Eurasia Drilling Company
- Children: Two

Alexander Putilov (January 1, 1952) is a Czech businessperson and co-owns Eurasia Drilling Company Limited. Eurasia Drilling Company is a provider of offshore in the Caspian Sea and onshore drilling services in Iraq. As of per the Forbes list of 2011, he is the 1,057th richest person in the world and 84th richest person in Russia. Putilov has a net worth of US$1.1 billion. He is a first-generation entrepreneur and his wealth is self-made.

== Education ==
Putilov has obtained Bachelor of Arts and Bachelor of Science degrees from Tyumen Industrial Institute. He graduated in 1974.

== History ==
Putilov, after graduating from Tyumen Industrial Institute in 1974, started working as a repairman. He then became the deputy head of a plant shop and later moved to chief mechanic.

== See also ==
- Forbes list of billionaires (2011)
- Business magnate
- Entrepreneur
- Billionaire
- List of countries by the number of billionaires
