= Ozone Zeno =

French paraglider

Zeno
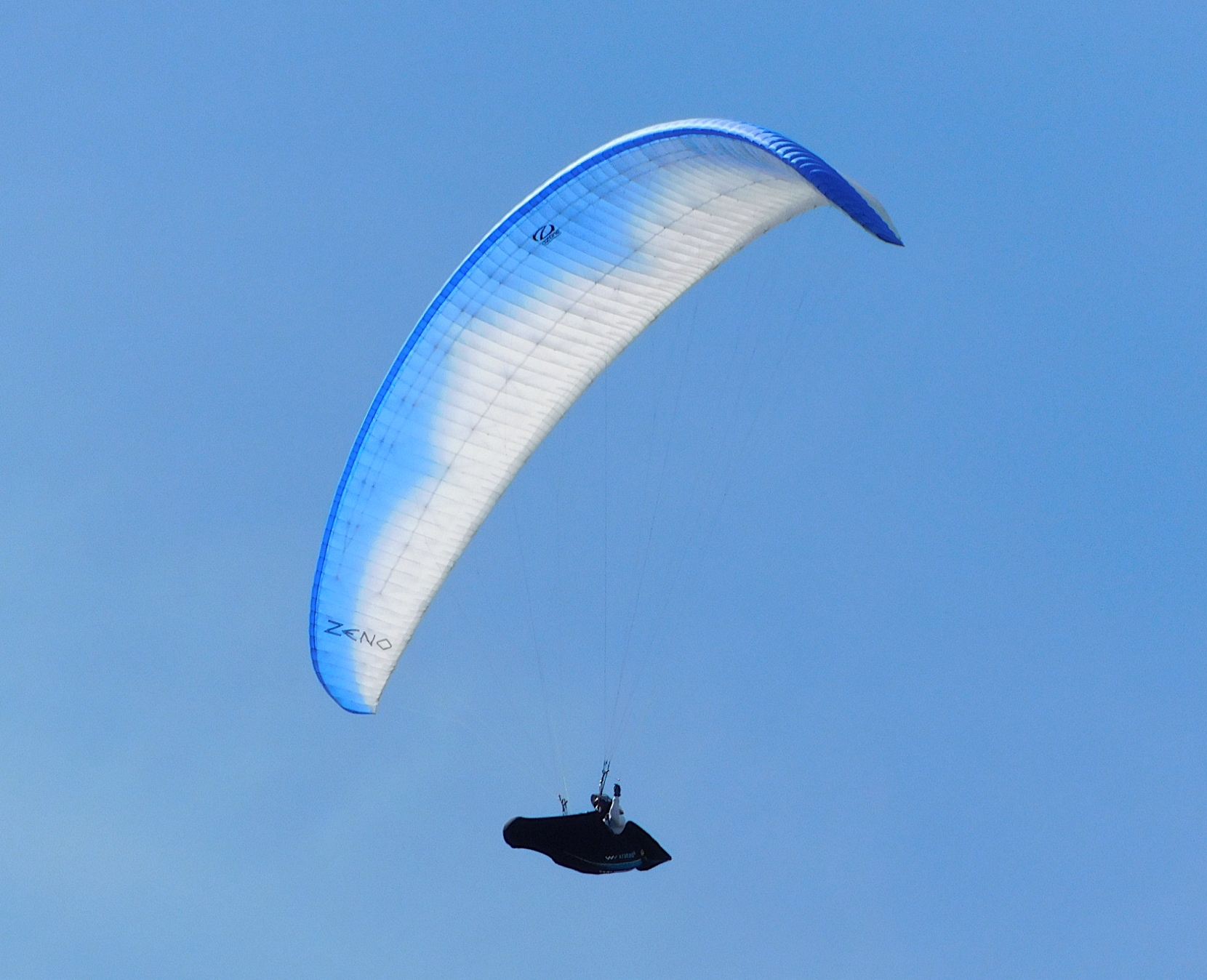

General information
- Type: Paraglider
- National origin: France
- Manufacturer: Ozone Gliders
- Designer: Ozone R&D Team
- Status: In production

History
- Introduction date: 2016

The Ozone Zeno is a French single-place paraglider that was designed by the Ozone R&D Team and has been produced by Ozone Gliders of Le Bar-sur-Loup, France, since 2016.

== Design and development ==
The aircraft was designed as a competition glider for expert-level pilots and is produced in four sizes to match pilot weight ranges. It is a two-line design, with only A and B risers. The B-risers have wooden handles for rear-riser control.

The glider is made from a combination of 27g Porcher Sport Skytex 27 Classic and Dominico 30D fabrics. Of the choice of fabric the company says, "due to the extensive use of light materials in this wing, it is less durable than an M6, for example. These lightweight and high performance materials require care and caution on the ground."

== Operational history ==
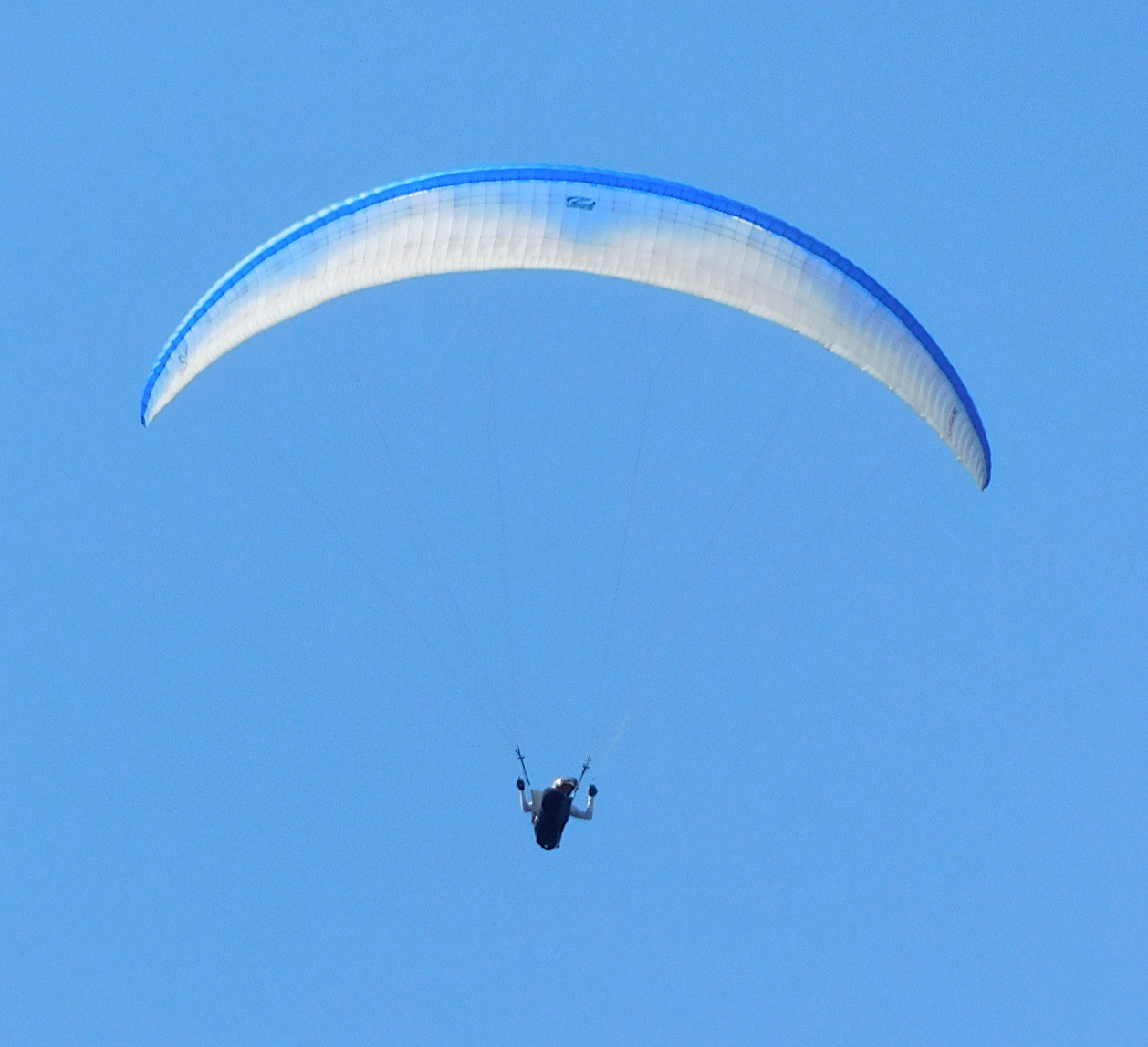
Ozone Zeno paraglider

Reviewer Seb Ospina described the Zeno in a 2017 video review as comparable in performance to the Enzo 2, but more demanding to fly, saying "like all two-liners, it can potentially bite". He termed it "cohesive" and "solid". Hugh Miller described it as taking some time flying it to get used to its different flying characteristics.

Hugh Miller also did a written review for Cross Country magazine in which he advised caution for pilots considering a move up to the Zeno, "in conclusion, I know far more pilots who've changed up wings too quickly and got scared than pilots who’ve got better. My advice would be to think about it seriously before stepping onto a Zeno as your first EN-D, and if you’re worried about it, give yourself an easier entry into EN-D.".

== Variants ==
Zeno S
Small-sized model for lighter pilots. Its 9.6 m (31.5 ft) span wing has a wing area of 17.8 m^{2} (192 sq ft), 78 cells and the aspect ratio is 5.2:1. The flight weight range is 75 to 90 kg (165 to 198 lb). The glider model is EN D certified.
Zeno MS
Medium small-sized model for meid-weight pilots. Its 9.9 m (32.5 ft) span wing has a wing area of 19 m^{2} (200 sq ft), 78 cells and the aspect ratio is 5.2:1. The flight weight range is 85 to 100 kg (187 to 220 lb). The glider model is EN D certified.
Zeno ML
Medium large-sized model for mid-weight pilots. Its 10.3 m (33.8 ft) span wing has a wing area of 20.4 m^{2} (220 sq ft), 78 cells and the aspect ratio is 5.2:1. The flight weight range is 95 to 110 kg (209 to 243 lb). The glider model is EN D certified.
Zeno L
Large-sized model for heavier pilots. Its 10.8 m (35.4 ft) span wing has a wing area of 22.4 m^{2} (241 sq ft), 78 cells and the aspect ratio is 5.2:1. The flight weight range is 105 to 125 kg (231 to 276 lb). The glider model is EN D certified.

== Specifications (Zeno ML) ==
Data from Manufacturer and Cross Country magazine

General characteristics

- Crew: one
- Wingspan: 10.3 m (33 ft 10 in)
- Wing area: 20.4 m^{2} (220 sq ft)
- Aspect ratio: 5.2:1
- Empty weight: 5.3 kg (12 lb) glider weight
- Gross weight: 110 kg (243 lb)
