= OSU PG-I =

1970s United States experimental glider

PG-I

General information
- Type: Glider
- National origin: United States
- Manufacturer: Ohio State University
- Designer: David W. Hall
- Number built: 1

History
- First flight: August 21, 1970

The PG-I was an experimental glider built by a team of Ohio State University undergraduates, and was notable for being constructed entirely of paper and cardboard.

== Background ==
Prompted by a 1970 paper airplane contest jointly sponsored by the Columbus Dispatch newspaper and the Columbus-based Center of Science and Industry, a team of six OSU students, led by David W. Hall, decided to build the world's first piloted paper airplane. It was to be constructed using only paper, cardboard, glue and masking tape.

== Design and construction ==
The design phase of the project commenced in May 1970, with the original design being modelled on the Tupolev ANT-1 low-wing monoplane. The craft was later re-designed to relocate the wing to a mid-fuselage position. Initial engineering calculations determined their design would have a wingspan of 28 ft (8.5 m), a wing area of 80 ft^{2} (7.4 m^{2}), weigh 500 lb (230 kg) and have a take-off speed of 35 mph (56 km/h). During construction, a further re-design occurred, with the wing being raised to a shoulder-wing position. Issues with the structural strength of the tubing used for the wing-spars resulted in the span being reduced to 18 ft (5.5 m).

The wing was constructed from three tubular spars made of rolled cardboard, with wing ribs constructed from plies of corrugated paper, and was covered using two plies of brown wrapping paper. The fuselage was built using four longitudinal tubular spars. Sheets of corrugated cardboard doubled as the nose of the fuselage and as the landing skid. Additionally, string and nylon cords were used to apply tension within the glider's framework.

== Operational history ==
David W. Hall standing next to the PG-I glider

Testing of the PG-I, without a pilot aboard, took place during August 1970 at Don Scott Field, now known as Ohio State University Airport. An initial towed test on August 21 confirmed a take-off speed of 41 mph (66 km/h). A later towed test on August 30 saw the PG-I making a flight that lasted seven seconds, covering a distance of 300 ft (91 m) and climbing up to 30 ft (9.1 m), before stalling and crashing to the ground. That crash caused severe damage to the wing-spars and to the fuselage, and resulted in the end of testing.

Hall designed a second paper glider, the PG-II, which was to have a fully enclosed fuselage. A scale model was tested in a wind-tunnel at OSU, while the full-sized craft was reported to be under construction in 1971.

== Specifications ==
The PG-I glider after its last flight

Data from News In Engineering

General characteristics

- Wingspan: 18 ft (5.5 m)
- Wing area: 54 sq ft (5.0 m^{2})
- Aspect ratio: 6
- Airfoil: Joukowski 579
- Empty weight: 300 lb (136 kg)

Performance

- Cruise speed: 41 mph (66 km/h, 36 kn)
