= O'Neill Aristocraft II =

Aristocraft II

General information
- Type: Homebuilt aircraft
- National origin: United States
- Manufacturer: O'Niell Aircraft Company
- Designer: Terrence O'Neill
- Number built: 1

History
- Developed from: Waco Aristocraft

The Aristocraft II was a six-place homebuilt aircraft designed by Terrence O'Neill.

== Design and development ==
The Aristocraft II was a redesigned aircraft built off the prototype airframe of the WACO Aristocraft. The Franklin-powered Aristocraft pusher was rebuilt using the wings and most of the internal structure of the original. The layout was drastically changed from a twin-tailed, mid-engined, pusher to a conventional tractor arrangement. The intent was to develop a homebuilt aircraft from the design with the flexibility to carry six passengers, or fewer people with extended range. An effort was made to certify the design, under the name Model W Winner but money ran out before completion, with only two orders.

The Aristocraft II was a strut-braced, high-wing, tricycle gear, six-passenger aircraft designed for Franklin or Lycoming 200 hp (149 kW) engines. The fuselage was made of welded steel tubing with aluminum skin. The cowling was split vertically, and could hinge open for maintenance.

== Variants ==
The standard engine was a six-cylinder Lycoming, however plans were drawn for a 245 hp (183 kW) Jacobs L-4MB radial engine installation and also for a Continental R-670 radial installation. This specified that the engine would be mounted closer to the firewall and also incorporated conventional landing gear, a 93 in (236 cm) propeller and the outward appearance of "Mr. Muligan", this evolved into the O'Neill Magnum.

== Specifications (Arisocraft II) ==
Data from Sport Aviation, Air Trails Summer 1971

General characteristics

- Crew: one
- Capacity: five passengers
- Length: 25 ft 10 in (7.87 m)
- Wingspan: 36 ft 10 in (11.23 m)
- Height: 8 ft (2.4 m)
- Wing area: 190 sq ft (18 m^{2})
- Airfoil: NACA 4415
- Empty weight: 1,800 lb (816 kg)
- Gross weight: 3,300 lb (1,497 kg)
- Fuel capacity: 76 gal
- Powerplant: 1 × Lycoming IO-360 four-cylinder, direct-drive, horizontally-opposed, air-cooled, piston aircraft engine, 200 hp (150 kW)
- Propellers: 2-bladed
- Maximum speed: 120 kn (140 mph, 230 km/h)
- Cruise speed: 110 kn (130 mph, 210 km/h)
- Stall speed: 48 kn (55 mph, 89 km/h)
- Range: 700 nmi (800 mi, 1,300 km)
- Service ceiling: 15,000 ft (4,600 m)
- Rate of climb: 500 ft/min (2.5 m/s)

== See also ==
- O'Neill Pea Pod - another aircraft built by Terrence O'Neill

Aircraft of comparable role, configuration, and era

- Waco Aristocraft - The last aircraft built by the WACO company. One model rebuilt and named Aristorcraft II.
