= Japaridze family =

Georgian royal family

Princely Coat of Arms of the House of Japaridze in the Russian Empire (1850)

The House of Japaridze (Georgian: ჯაფარიძე) is an ancient Georgian noble family, originated in the Duchy of Racha, known from c. 1400.

== History ==
A family legend recorded by Prince Ioann of Georgia in his genealogical treatise holds it that the Japaridze family descended from the Mongol ("Chingisid") officer in Racha called Japhar whose scions later converted to Georgian Orthodox Christianity and were ennobled by the Kings of Georgia. They possibly held the Duchy of Racha between the dispossession of the House of Kakhaberidze and the establishment of the Charelidze family. The Japaridze family formed several lines: a princely one in the Kingdom of Imereti, and a petite noble branches in the kingdoms of Kartli, Kakheti, and Imereti.

Under the Russian rule, after annexation of Georgia, the family was incorporated into the Russian nobility and in 1850 received the hereditary title of Knyaz in the Russian Empire. The title can be inherited only by the legitimate male-line descendants. That means that legitimate male members of the family were entitled to the rank of knyaz, while legitimate female born members were also entitled to the rank of knyaginya, but without the right to transmit their title to their offspring when they get married.

Current descendants of the family live in Estonia.

== Notable members ==
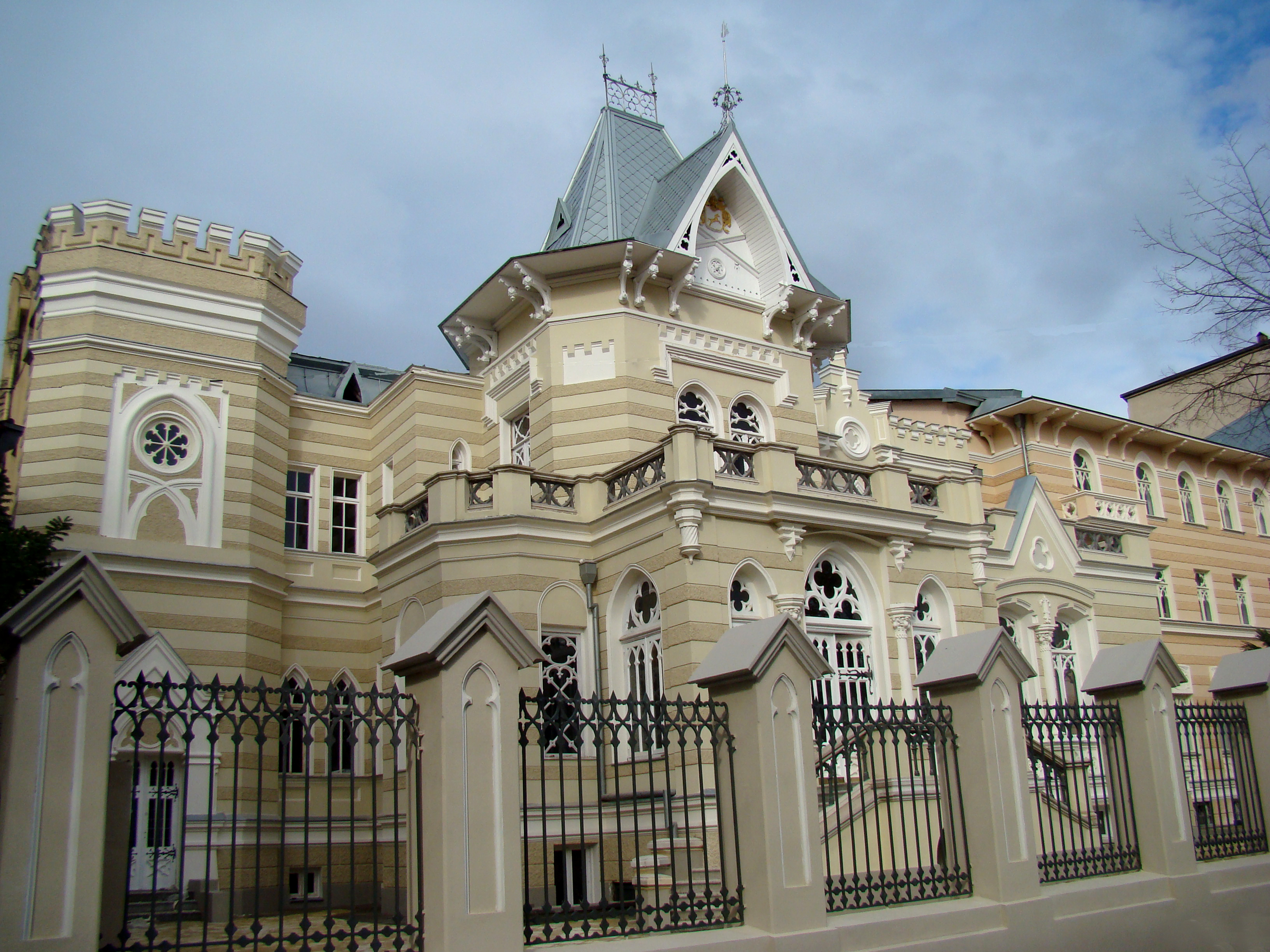
Former residence of Agrippina Japaridze in Tbilisi, currently a museum

- Agrippina Japaridze (1855—1927), former Princess Dadiani married in 1882 Duke Constantine Petrovich of Oldenburg (1850—1906) and received for her and her descendants the title of Count(ess) von Zarnekau. She was deemed ineligible for the title of Duchess of Oldenburg due to the marriage being considered morganatic.
- Prokofy Japaridze (1880-1918), Bolshevik revolutionary, one of the leaders of the Red Army and the Bolshevik Party in Azerbaijan during the Russian Revolution
- Tedo Japaridze (born September 18, 1946), Georgian politician and diplomat, former Minister of Foreign Affairs of Georgia
- Alexander Japaridze (born July 20, 1955), a Russian-Georgian businessman based in London, United Kingdom
