= Aleksei Putilov =

Russian government official, banker and industrialist

Aleksei Ivanovich Putilov
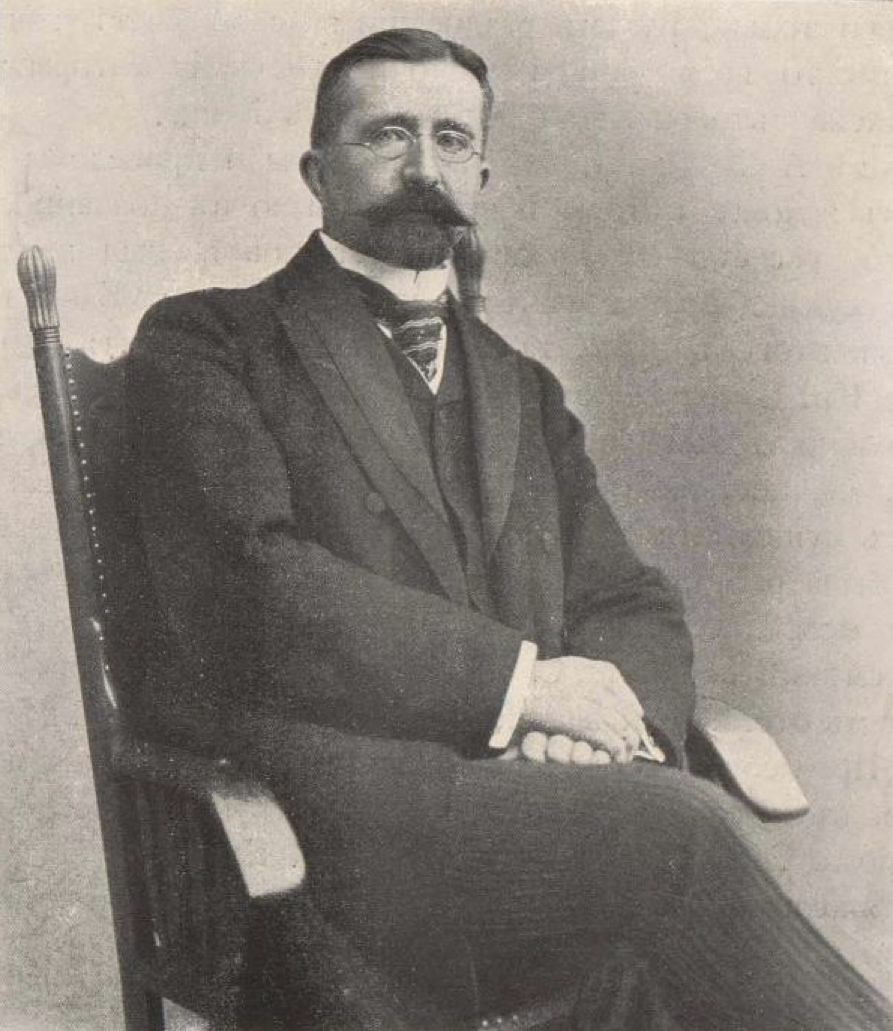
- Putilov in the 1910s
- Born: 6 July 1866 (New Style); Novgorod Governorate, Russian Empire
- Died: 2 June 1940 (aged 73); Paris, France
- Education: St. Petersburg University
- Occupations: Banker, industrialist, and government official
- Known for: Managing Director of the Russo-Chinese Bank
- Spouse: Vera Alexandrovna Zeyfart
- Children: Four
- Father: Ivan Pavlovich Putilov
- Relatives: Nikolay Putilov (granduncle)

Aleksei Ivanovich Putilov (1866–1940) was a Russian government official, banker and industrialist. He became Managing Director and later Chairman of the Russo-Chinese Bank. After the Russian Revolution Putilov and his family escaped to France after having supporting failed opposition groups. He continued to manage the bank in exile from Paris for some time until he was forced to resign in 1926.

== Early life and government service ==
Putilov was born on 24 June (6 July New Style) in Novgorod Governorate, the son of the privy councilor Ivan Pavlovich Putilov (1839-1916) and grandnephew of the entrepreneur Nikolai Ivanovich Putilov (1820-1880). He graduated from St. Petersburg University with a law degree in 1889 and, declining an offer of training to become a professor at the university, he entered the Ministry of Finance in 1890 as an assistant to the Ministry's legal adviser. In 1896 he was initiated as a freemason in the French Cosmos Lodge.

He was appointed a clerk in the General Office of the Ministry of Finance in 1898. Putilov was made Acting Director of the General Office in 1900 and full Director of the General Office in 1902. On 28 October (9 November) 1905 he was named Deputy Minister of Finance, in which capacity he headed the Nobility State Land Bank and the State Peasant's Land Bank.

In 1905 Putilov drew up a plan for the expansion of the peasants' freeholding, under which the landowners would sell a part of their estates. When Tsar Nicholas II rejected this scheme, Putilov resigned from government service on 24 April (7 May) 1906.

Putilov and his family owned Château La Martinette, an estate in Provence, France.

== Banking career ==
In the private sector, Putilov became a member of the board of the Russo-Chinese Bank in 1906 and managing director in 1908. This bank was the largest shareholder of the Chinese Eastern Railway. Upon the merger in 1910 of the Russo-Chinese Bank with the Northern Bank to form the Russo-Asiatic Bank, he was elected chairman of the new institution, which soon became the largest private-sector bank in Russia.

During the 1910-14 period Putilov organized the largest monopolies in Russia, including the Military Industrial Concern ("Russian Society for the Manufacture of Shells and Military Supplies"), the Russian Tobacco Trust, and the Russian General Oil Company, organized in 1912 to control all Russian oil production outside of the Nobel and Shell groups.

Putilov was a member of the Board of Industry and Commerce, and during the First World War he was a member of the Special Supply Meeting of the Ministry of War.

== Directorships ==
Putilov was the chairman or board member of the following companies in the 1910-1917 period:

- Russo-Asiatic Bank
- Putilov Works
- Baltic Works
- Nevsky Works
- Armavir-Tuapse Railway
- Southeastern Railway
- Moscow-Kazan Railway
- Russian Society for the Manufacture of Shells and Military Supplies
- St. Petersburg Carriage Works Partnership
- Zhillovsky Society of Coal Mines
- Gorsko-Ivanovo Coal Society
- G.M. Lianozov & Sons (petroleum)
- Emba-Caspian Joint Stock Company (petroleum)
- Baku Oil Society
- Siemens-Schuckert Russian Company
- Rex Battery Works
- St. Petersburg Power Transmission Society
- Electric Power Joint Stock Company
- Promet Joint Stock Company
- Baranovsky Works
- A.F. Marx Publishing House Partnership

== Revolution and exile ==
Following the abdication of Nicholas II in 1917, Putilov and V.I. Vyshnegradsky organized the Society for the Economic Revival of Russia. Putilov actively supported General Lavr Kornilov, whose coup attempt in September 1917 (N.S.) was a failure.

Putilov was a member of the Provisional Council of the Russian Republic, which convened in Petrograd on 7 (20) October 1917. Following the Bolshevik coup of 25 October (7 November) 1917, the Provisional Council was dissolved. All assets of the Russo-Asiatic Bank within Russia were nationalized by the Bolshevik government. Putilov left for Harbin, in Manchuria, which was the center of the economic base of the Russo-Asiatic Bank. His elder son Sergei had previously left for Paris, while the remainder of the family remained at their home in Petrograd at 11 Mytninskaya Embankment.

In his absence, all of Putilov's properties, movable and unmovable, were confiscated by decree of the Council of People's Commissars on 30 December 1917 (12 January 1918). In the spring of 1918 Putilov's wife Vera, daughter Ekaterina, granddaughter, and younger son Ivan were able to escape to Finland and thence to Paris. In the meantime, in Harbin Putilov collaborated with Leytenant-General (Lieutenant-General) Dmitry Khorvat, the head of the Chinese Eastern Railway, in maintaining "White" Russian control of the railway and providing financial assistance to the anti-Bolshevik "Armed Forces in the South of Russia," led by General Pyotr Wrangel.

Putilov then joined his family in Paris, where he restored the activities of the Russo-Asiatic Bank on the basis of its foreign branches, with its main office in Paris. In 1921 he negotiated with Leonid Krasin about the possibility of creating a Soviet-French issuing bank to help the Soviet government carry out monetary reforms. Nothing came of the discussions, but when they were publicized and misrepresented by the emigre press in 1926, Putilov was forced to resign as chairman of the Russo-Asiatic Bank. He was succeeded by Knyaz (Prince) Sergei Kudashev. The bank failed on 26 September 1926 after losing some five million pounds in speculation in the Paris financial market, and was finally liquidated in 1928.

Putilov died in Paris on 2 June 1940.

== Family ==
Putilov married Vera Alexandrovna Zeyfart (German: Wera Seyfert), daughter of Lieutenant-General Alexander Alexandrovich Zeyfart (1835-1918). They were the parents of four children:

- Ekaterina (married name Rosalion-Soshalskaya)
- Sergei
- Maria (died 12 (25) May 1912, having taken a fatal dose of arsenic after her father disapproved of the man she loved; her beloved shot himself near the home of the Putilov family on Mytninskaya Embankment)
- Ivan (12 (25) December 1902 - 18 May 1977)
