= Franklin O-500 =

O-500/6AL/6A8
- Type: Piston aircraft engine
- National origin: United States
- Manufacturer: Franklin Engine Company
- First run: 1945

The Franklin O-500 (company designation 6AL-500 and 6A8-215) was an American air-cooled aircraft engine that first ran in the mid-1940s. The engine was of six-cylinder, horizontally-opposed layout and displaced 500 cu in (8 L). The power output was 215 hp (160 kW).

== Variants ==
6AL-500
(alternative designation) 215 hp (160 kW) at 2,500 rpm, with crankcase/prop-shaft extension for pusher installation.
6A8-215-B8F
215 hp (160 kW) at 2,500 rpm, with crankcase/prop-shaft extension for pusher installation.
6A8-215-B9F
same as B8F but with different ignition components.

== Applications ==
- Convair 106 Skycoach
- Piaggio P.136
- Republic RC-3 Seabee
- Waco Aristocraft

== Specifications (6AL-500 / 6AB-215-B8F) ==
Data from Aircraft engines of the World 1950.

=== General characteristics ===
- Type: 6-cylinder air-cooled horizontally opposed aircraft piston engine
- Bore: 5 in (127.0 mm)
- Stroke: 4.25 in (108.0 mm)
- Displacement: 500.76 cu in (8.2 L)
- Length: 66.3 in (168.4 cm)
- Width: 33.9 in (86.1 cm)
- Height: 27.4 in (69.6 cm)
- Dry weight: 488 lb (221 kg)

=== Components ===
- Valvetrain: 1x OHV exhaust and inlet per cylinder operated by push-rods and rockers
- Fuel system: 1x Marvel-Schebler MA4-5 updraught carburetor
- Fuel type: 80 octane Gasoline
- Oil system: Pressure feed at 35–45 psi (2.4–3.1 bar)
- Cooling system: Air-cooled with cooling fan and shrouds

=== Performance ===
- Power output: 215 hp (160 kW) at 2,500 rpm
- Specific power: 0.43 hp/cu in (19.6 kW/L)
- B.m.e.p.: 136 psi (9.38 bar)
- Compression ratio: 7:1
- Specific fuel consumption: 0.5 lb/(hp⋅h) (0.30 kg/kWh)
- Power-to-weight ratio: 0.44 hp/lb (0.72 kW/kg)

== See also ==
Comparable engines

- Lycoming O-540

Related lists

- List of aircraft engines
