= Eurasia Drilling Company =

Private company based in Nikosia, Cyprus

Eurasia Drilling Company Limited
- Company type: Private
- Traded as: LSE: EDCL
- Industry: Oil and gas
- Founder: Alexander Dzhaparidze
- Headquarters: Nikosia, Cyprus
- Area served: Caspian Sea, Iraq
- Key people: (CEO) Alexander Dzhaparidze, (CFO) Taleh Aleskerov, (COO) Tom Hardy, (Director) Chryso Pitsilli-Dekatris
- Website: eurasiadrilling.com

Eurasia Drilling Company limited (EDC) is a private company based in Nikosia, Cyprus. Eurasia Drilling Company is an offshore and onshore oil drilling services company. EDC operates the largest jack-up drilling fleet in the Caspian Sea. EDC also provides drilling services in Iraq.

== History ==
EDC was founded in the Cayman Islands.

It was listed on the London Stock Exchange before 2015, when it was taken private.

EDC sold Burovaya Kompaniya Eurasia LLC and all of its Russian assets to Razvitie Drilling Company LLC in 2022.

== Shlumberger acquisition ==
Schlumberger made a bid for EDC in 2015 but Russian Federal Antimonopoly Service (FAS) repeatedly delayed approvals, due to concerns over foreign ownership of a crucial asset in the hydrocarbon industry. As a result, the deal valuing EDC at $3.5 billion fell through.

Shlumberger made another bid for 51% of EDC in 2017. However, the second attempt also failed for same reasons amid deterioration in relations between Russia and the West.

Schlumberger acquired a minority stake in Eurasia Drilling Co. for $1.7 billion.
