= OMA SUD Redbird =

Italian sport aircraft

Redbird
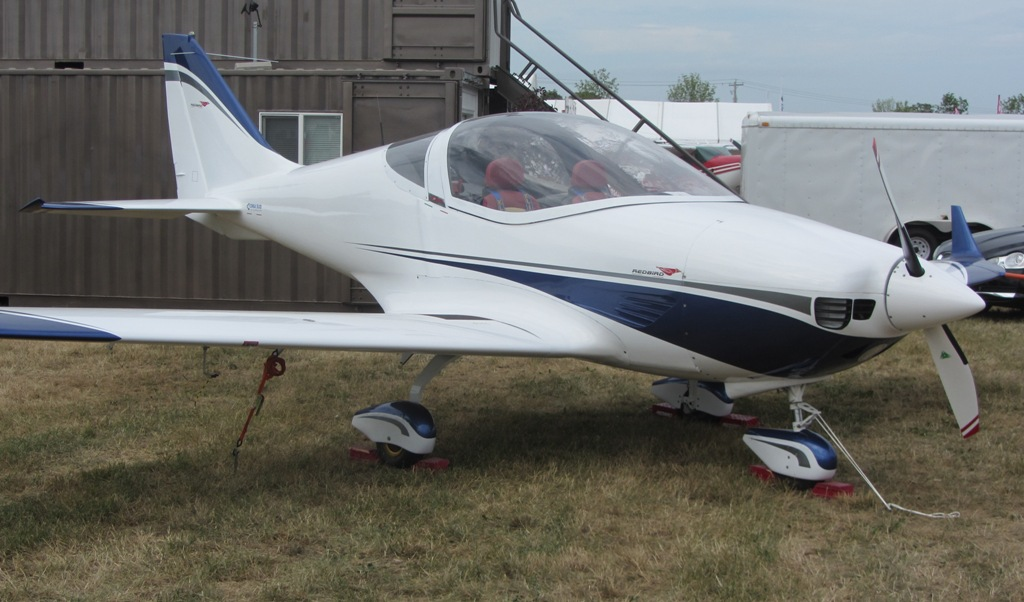

General information
- Type: Ultralight aircraft and Light-sport aircraft
- National origin: Italy
- Manufacturer: OMA Sud

History
- First flight: 2012

The OMA SUD Redbird is an Italian two-seat, composite light-sport aircraft (LSA) from composite maker OMA Sud. Introduced at the AERO Friedrichshafen show in 2012, the aircraft is supplied complete and ready-to-fly.

== Design and development ==
The Redbird is a carbon fiber, low-wing aircraft with side-by-side configuration seating and fixed tricycle landing gear powered by a 100 hp (75 kW) Rotax 912ULS or Rotax 912iS aircraft engine or a Fiat automotive diesel engine. The cockpit width is 135 cm (53 in). The airframe was designed to accommodate retractable gear and the intention is that the European version will offer fixed or retractable gear, while the US LSA version will have fixed landing gear.

The aircraft first flew in early 2012, but by 2015 manufacturing arrangements had not been finalized and production not commenced.

== Operational history ==
Reviewer Marino Boric described the design in a 2015 review as, "elegant and usually roomy" and added that it "belongs to the high end UL/LSA segment".

== Specifications (Redbird) ==
Data from EAA and manufacturer

General characteristics

- Crew: one
- Capacity: one
- Length: 7.3 m (23 ft 11 in)
- Wingspan: 8.53 m (28 ft 0 in)
- Height: 2.4 m (7 ft 10 in)
- Wing area: 10 m^{2} (110 sq ft)
- Gross weight: 600 kg (1,323 lb) 472.5 kg for UL version
- Fuel capacity: 110l
- Powerplant: 1 × Rotax 912S , 75 kW (100 hp)
- Propellers: 2-bladed MT-Propeller MTV-1 electrically controlled variable pitch propeller

Performance

- Maximum speed: 240 km/h (150 mph, 130 kn)
- Cruise speed: 220 km/h (140 mph, 120 kn)
- Stall speed: 78 km/h (48 mph, 42 kn) flaps down
- Service ceiling: 3,000 m (10,000 ft)
- g limits: +4.4/-2.2
- Rate of climb: 5.6 m/s (1,100 ft/min)
