= Tupolev ANT-1 =

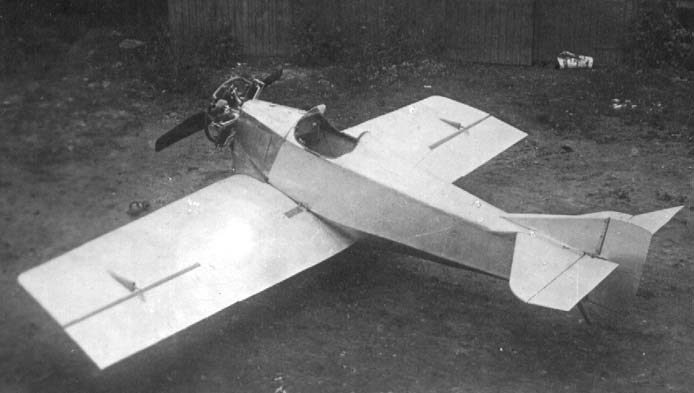

General information
- Type: Experimental aircraft
- Manufacturer: Tupolev
- Number built: 1

History
- First flight: 20 October 1923

The Tupolev ANT-1 was Tupolev OKB's first aircraft, designed by Andrei Tupolev based on his work with aerosleighs and boats. An experimental aircraft, it was expected to be used to examine Tupolev's ideas and to help the Soviets understand the use of metal in aircraft manufacturing.

== Design and development ==
The ANT-1 was Tupolev's first aircraft and was built from metal, wood, and aluminum. Aluminum was used in the wing partitions and ribs, the vertical and horizontal tailplanes, and a few other smaller areas. The other weight carrying elements were made of wood, with linen fabric covering the fuselage and wings.

== Operational history ==
The ANT-1 was first flown at Ekaterininskaya Square, now Krasnokazarmenaya Street. It was flown frequently over the next two years for tests. It was then stored in the assembly workshop – in the late 1930s and early 1940s, it was hung from the ceiling. However, with the disruptions to the bureau caused by World War II, it had disappeared by the time the war ended. The precise fate of the prototype is unknown, though it is likely that it was destroyed by the Germans in their advance to Moscow in the summer of 1941, along with other Tupolev aircraft. Since it was the only one built, there are no remaining ANT-1's today.

== Operators ==
Soviet Union

- Tupolev factory.

== Specifications ==
Data from Tupolev: The Man and His Aircraft

General characteristics

- Crew: one
- Length: 5.4 m (17 ft 8.5 in)
- Wingspan: 7.2 m (23 ft 7.38 in)
- Height: 1.7 m (5 ft 7 in)
- Wing area: 10.0 m^{2} (108 sq ft)
- Empty weight: 229 kg (504 lb)
- Gross weight: 360 kg (792 lb)
- Powerplant: 1 × Anzani radial , 26 kW (35 hp)

Performance

- Maximum speed: 135 km/h (84 mph, 73 kn)
- Range: 540 km (335 mi, 291 nmi)
- Service ceiling: 400 m (1,300 ft)
- Wing loading: 36 kg/m^{2} (7.4 lb/sq ft)

== See also ==
- Andrei Tupolev
- Tupolev
