= Ogden Osprey =

Osprey
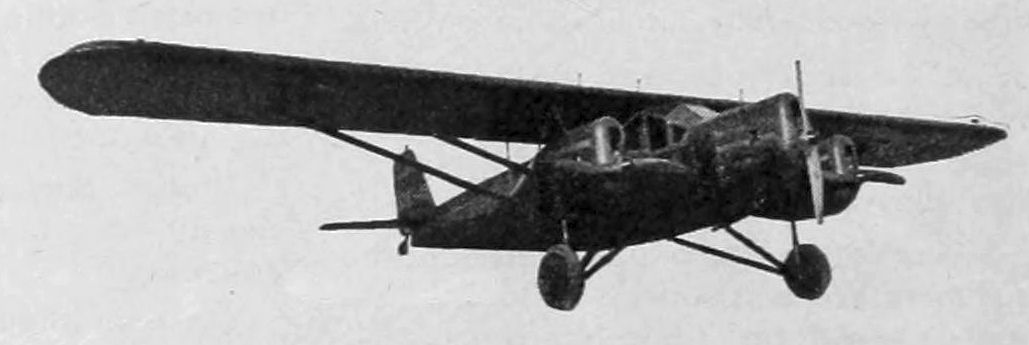
- Osprey C, upright Cirrus powered

General information
- Type: Five passenger, three-engined airliner
- National origin: U.S.
- Manufacturer: Ogden Aeronautical Co.
- Number built: 6

History
- First flight: early 1930

The Ogden Osprey was a three engine, high wing monoplane airliner which seated six. Designed in the United States and first flown in the spring of 1930 or earlier, six were built and some used commercially before Ogden Aeronautical ceased trading in the Great Depression.

== Design and development ==
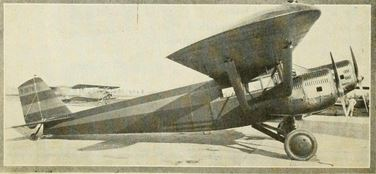
Osprey C, upright Cirrus powered

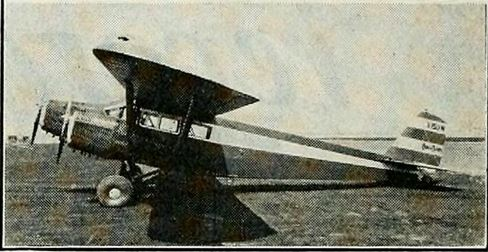
Osprey PB/PC, inverted Menasco Pirate powered

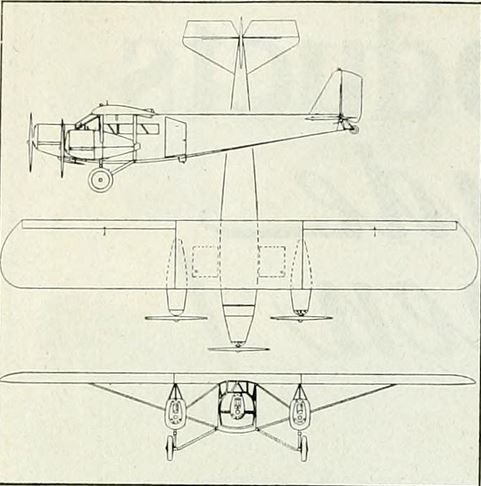

The trimotor Osprey was a monoplane with a high, three-part wing of rectangular plan out to blunted tips. Its centre section contained two 45 US gal (37 imp gal; 170 L) fuel tanks and extended as far as the outer engines. The trailing edges of the outer panels were filled with narrow chord ailerons. The wing was built around twin spruce box spars with spruce ribs and was fabric covered, though its leading edges were spruce plywood. The outer panels were braced from the lower fuselage longerons by parallel pairs of struts to the spars which ran through the outer engine mountings. The engines were further braced with central struts to the upper longerons.

Ospreys were fitted with at least three engine types. The prototype, as well as several later examples, had 90 hp (67 kW) upright, air-cooled four cylinder Cirrus III engines and were designated Osprey Cs. Others had either 95 hp (71 kW) inverted, air-cooled four cylinder Menasco B-4 or its larger capacity, 125 hp (93 kW) development, the Menasco C-4. As all four cylinder Menascos were named Pirate, these two variants were designated Osprey PB and PC respectively. All were enclosed in neat cowlings.

Both the rectangular cross-section fuselage and tail had welded Cr/Mo steel tubes structures and were fabric covered. The 13 ft (4.0 m) cabin accommodated six including a crew of one or two in the front row of side-by-side seats. The control column was of the throw-over type so it could be flown from either side. Alternatively, a fifth passenger could sit beside the pilot. The main landing wheels were equipped with differential brakes; a single settable lever between the front seat applied the required braking resistance but when the rudder pedal were operated the resistance was applied differentially. Cabin entry was by an angular door at the rear, where there was also a toilet. The tail surfaces were conventional with a triangular fin and tailplane, the latter mounted on top of the fuselage. The control surfaces were trapezoidal.

The Osprey's landing gear was of the fixed, split-axle, tailwheel type, with a track of 14 ft (4.3 m). The axles and drag struts were mounted on the lower fuselage longerons and the original Bendix system had short, oleo strut shock-absorbing landing legs to the engine mountings. Alternatively, Goodyear Airwheels, large low pressure balloon tyres more suitable for soft field operations, were offered after the conclusion of successful trials in mid-1930.

== Operational history ==
The date of the Osprey's first flight are not exactly known but was in or before the spring of 1930. By mid-summer its characteristics were well enough known for it to have also completed its programme with the Goodyear Airwheels. The dates of tests with the two later Menasco Pirate engine types are also not known. Before the financial failure of the Great Depression ended Ogden's company in 1933 it had built six Ospreys, including the prototype and at least two Menasco C-5 powered Osprey PCs. At least two Ospreys were operated commercially: photographs show NC-338V, an Osprey C with "SKY SIGN BROADCASTER" and NC150W, an Osprey PB with "CIA. NACIONAL AVIACION" on their fuselages. Compania Nacional de Aviacion (CNA) was a Guatemalan company.

== Variants ==
Osprey C
Powered by 90 hp (67 kW) upright, air-cooled four cylinder Cirrus III. At least one, the prototype.
Osprey PB (a.k.a. Pirate)
Powered by 95 hp (71 kW) inverted, air-cooled four cylinder Menasco B-4 Pirate.
Osprey PC
Powered by 125 hp (93 kW) inverted, air-cooled four cylinder Menasco C-4 Pirate. At least two used commercially.

== Specifications (Menasco B-4 Pirate engines) ==
Data from Aero Digest, April 1931

General characteristics

- Crew: one/two
- Capacity: five/four passengers
- Length: 34 ft 6 in (10.52 m)
- Wingspan: 50 ft (15 m)
- Height: 9 ft 3 in (2.82 m)
- Wing area: 312 sq ft (29.0 m^{2}) including ailerons
- Empty weight: 2,850 lb (1,293 kg)
- Gross weight: 4,500 lb (2,041 kg)
- Fuel capacity: 90 US gal (75 imp gal; 340 L)
- Powerplant: 3 × Menasco B-4 Pirate four cylinder air-cooled inverted inline, 95 hp (71 kW) each
- Propellers: 2-bladed Hamilton Standard

Performance

- Maximum speed: 130 mph (210 km/h, 110 kn)
- Cruise speed: 102 mph (164 km/h, 89 kn)
- Landing speed: 50 mph (80 km/h; 43 kn)
- Range: 500 mi (800 km, 430 nmi)
- Service ceiling: 15,000 ft (4,600 m)
- Time to altitude: 10 min to 5,500 ft (1,700 m)
