= O'Neill Magnum =

Magnum

General information
- Type: Homebuilt aircraft
- National origin: United States
- Manufacturer: O'Neill Airplane Company
- Designer: Terrence O'Neill

History
- Developed from: O'Neill Aristocraft II

The O'Neill Model J Magnum, also called the Magnum Jake and the Magnum Pickup, is a homebuilt aircraft design for bush flying operations similar to the de Havilland Beaver.

== Design and development ==
O'Neill intended to modify the Aristocraft II six-place homebuilt with a 350 hp (261 kW) radial engine. Eventually a clean sheet design was drawn up based on a bush pilot survey in Alaska.

The Magnum is a single-engine, strut-braced, high-wing aircraft with an uncommon dual-main, four-wheel landing gear. The fiberglass gear legs support castoring wheels in the front, allowing for conversion to floats and providing support when the tail section is swung open for cargo loading. The fuselage is constructed from welded steel tubing, with aluminum skin. The engine cowl is sourced from a Cessna UC-78. The wings have full-span flaps, and spoilerons and are designed to fold like those of a Fairchild FB-2C. The fuel tank is mounted under the cockpit and can be released to reduce fire risk during emergency landings.

Post flight-testing modifications resulted in changes to the landing gear layout, spoileron airflow control and engine cooling.

The Magnum was demonstrated at the EAA Airshow in 1984. In 1996, O'Neill folded the O'Neill aircraft company due to low interest and funding for further development. The prototype was sold in 1996 for an intended turboprop conversion.

== Variants ==
Magnum
Model J Magnum
Magnum Jake
Magnum Pickup
Magnum V8 Pickup
The prototype was converted in 1986 from a radial engine to an automobile engine powered by a Ford 351W with a McCulloch VS57 supercharger from a snowmobile, producing 380 hp (283 kW) at 4500rpm.

== Specifications (Model J Magnum perf estimated) ==
Data from Jane's All the World's Aircraft 1984-85

General characteristics

- Crew: 1
- Capacity: 7 pax
- Length: 24 ft 0 in (7.32 m)
- Wingspan: 30 ft 3 in (9.22 m)
- Width: 9 ft (2.7 m) folded
- Height: 9 ft 7 in (2.92 m)
- Wing area: 159.3 sq ft (14.80 m^{2})
- Aspect ratio: 5.7
- Airfoil: NACA 4415
- Empty weight: 2,050 lb (930 kg)
- Max takeoff weight: 3,800 lb (1,724 kg) MTOW and MLW
- Fuel capacity: 56 US gal (47 imp gal; 212 L) tank under forward fuselage with optional 90 US gal (75 imp gal; 341 L) auxiliary tank
- Powerplant: 1 × Jacobs R-755S 7-cylinder air-cooled turbocharged radial engine, 350 hp (260 kW)
- Propellers: 3-bladed Hartzell B3P20

Performance

- Cruise speed: 122 kn (140 mph, 226 km/h) at sea level

174 kn (200 mph; 322 km/h) at 18,000 ft (5,486 m)

- Stall speed: 60 kn (69 mph, 110 km/h)
- Never exceed speed: 161 kn (185 mph, 298 km/h) with flaps extended
- Range: 347 nmi (399 mi, 643 km) with maximum standard fuel, 45 minutes reserve
- Ferry range: 608 nmi (700 mi, 1,126 km) with optional 90 US gal (75 imp gal; 341 L) auxiliary tank, 45 minutes reserve
- Wing loading: 23.85 lb/sq ft (116.4 kg/m^{2})
- Power/mass: 0.092 hp/lb (0.151 kW/kg)
- Minimum Ground turning radius: 14 ft (4 m)

== See also ==
Aircraft of comparable role, configuration, and era

- de Havilland Canada DHC-2 Beaver
