= Orenco (aircraft manufacturer) =

- Founded: 1916
- Products: Aircraft

Orenco was an American aircraft manufacturer founded in 1916 in New York as Ordnance Engineering Corporation. Confusion with the Ordnance Branch of the United States Army led to the shortening of the name in 1919. The company's first project was the Orenco A in 1917, but they received no orders for it. The Orenco B and C received small orders, but the Orenco D was the most successful of their aircraft. The US Army Air Service (USAAS) bought four prototypes, but the order for 50 production aircraft was given to the lowest bidder, in this case Curtiss Aeroplane and Motor Company.

Orenco's projects in civil aviation failed as well, due to the number of aircraft available after the end of World War I. The company consequently went out of business.

== Aircraft ==
Summary of aircraft built by Orenco
| Model name | First flight | Number built | Type |
|---|---|---|---|
| Orenco A | 1917 | 1 | trainer |
| Orenco B | 1918 | 4 | Fighter |
| Orenco C | 1918 | 5 | trainer |
| Orenco D | 1919 | 4 | Fighter |
| Orenco IL-1 | 1919 | 2 | liaison |
