= Ozone Gliders =

French aircraft manufacturer

Ozone Gliders Limited
- Company type: Privately held company
- Industry: Aerospace
- Headquarters: Edinburgh, Scotland
- Key people: CEO: Mike Cavanagh
- Products: paragliders, paramotors, power kites, wing foiling wings
- Website: flyozone.com

Ozone Gliders is a manufacturer of paragliders, paramotors, power kites, and wings for wing foiling based in Le Bar-sur-Loup, France, although it is registered in Edinburgh, Scotland.

The company's CEO is Mike Cavanagh, while gliders are designed by Robbie Whittall, a world champion pilot in both hang gliding and paragliding.

The company produces a complete line of paragliders. In 2003 their line-up included the training Atom, tandem two-place Mac Daddy Bi, mountain descent Peak, competition Proton GT, sports Ozone Vibe and the intermediate Vulcan.

Whittall and Ozone have collaborated with other companies, such as Pilots Right Stuff in the design of their PRS Peak mountain descent glider.

== Divisions ==
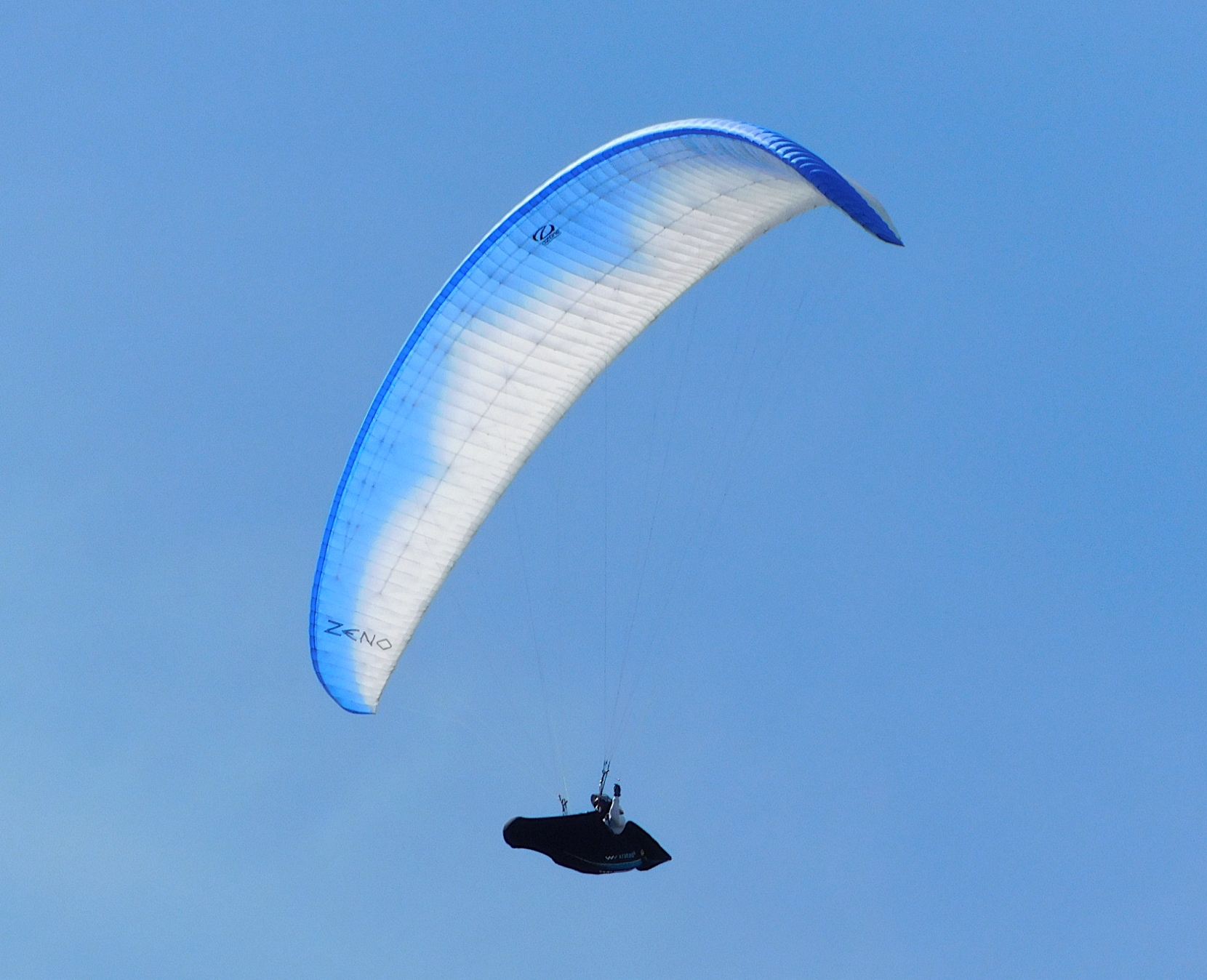
Ozone Zeno competition paraglider

The company has four divisions:

- Ozone Gliders Limited - manufactures paragliders
- Ozone Power Limited - manufactures paramotor and speed flying wings
- Ozone Kites Limited - manufactures parafoil kites for water, snow and land
- Ozone Kitesurf Limited - manufactures inflatable kites for kitesurfing

== See also ==
- Ozone Zeno
- Ozone Enzo
