= Onishi OSG3 =

OSG3

General information
- Type: Single-seat powered sailplane
- National origin: Japan
- Manufacturer: Yuichi Onishi
- Number built: 1

History
- First flight: 1977

The Onishi OSG3 is a 1970s Japanese single-seat motor glider, designed and built by Yuichi Onishi (大西勇一,Onishi Yuichi). This was his second motor-glider design; the first being a high-wing monoplane, powered by a Subaru car engine, with which he made a 120 km (75 mi) flight between Chigasaki and Oshima Island in July 1970.

== Design and development ==
The OSG3 is unusual in being powered by six model aircraft engines, which are arranged along a transverse strut-braced boom near the front of the fuselage. Together, the six engines produce 7.5 kW (10.1 hp) for take-off, and 5.6 kW (7.5 hp) for cruising flight. There are six throttle levers and also six cut-out switches for the engines. The aircraft has a cantilevered monoplane wing, in a shoulder-wing position on the fuselage. The empennage has a T-tail configuration.

Design of the OSG3 began in January 1976, with construction commencing in July of that year. By January 1977, the aircraft had been completed and taxiing trial conducted.

== Specifications ==
Data from Jane's all the world's aircraft 1977-78 and Gliders & sailplanes of the world

General characteristics

- Crew: 1
- Length: 6.50 m (21 ft 4 in)
- Wingspan: 14.60 m (47 ft 11 in)
- Height: 1.6 m (5 ft 3 in)
- Wing area: 17.2 m^{2} (185 sq ft)
- Aspect ratio: 11.6
- Airfoil: Göttingen 535 modified
- Empty weight: 65 kg (143 lb)
- Gross weight: 135 kg (298 lb)
- Powerplant: 6 × OS-60 FSR 10cc two-stroke glow plug engines, 1.12 kW (1.50 hp) each
- Propellers: 2-bladed, 0.30 m (1 ft) diameter

Performance

- Cruise speed: 39 km/h (24 mph, 21 kn)
- Stall speed: 34 km/h (21 mph, 18 kn)
