= OOS Aviatourist =

Aviatourist

General information
- Type: High-Speed Transport / Reconnaissance Aircraft
- National origin: USSR
- Manufacturer: OOS (Otdel Opytnogo Samolyetostroeniya - Department of experimental aircraft construction)
- Number built: 1

The Aviatourist was a long-range racing aircraft designed and built in the USSR, completed in 1936.

== Development ==
The Aviatourist was designed as a twin-engined, twin-seat long-range racing aircraft with a very similar layout to the de Havilland DH.88 Comet racer. With a structure mainly of Bakelite impregnated plywood (Delta-wood) the crew were housed in tandem cockpits and the engines in nacelles attached to the wings. The sole aircraft was completed in 1936 awaiting delivery of the de Havilland Gipsy Major engines, which failed to arrive causing the project to be abandoned.

== Specifications (Aviatourist) ==
Data from Gunston, Bill. "Encyclopaedia of Russian Aircraft 1875-1995". London:Osprey. 1995. ISBN 1-85532-405-9

General characteristics

- Crew: two
- Wing area: 10.18 m^{2} (109.6 sq ft)
- Powerplant: 2 × de Havilland Gipsy Major , 96.9 kW (130 hp) each

Performance

== See also ==
Aircraft of comparable role, configuration, and era

- de Havilland DH.88 Comet
- Caudron C.640 Typhon
- Grigorovich E-2

Related lists

- List of aircraft
