= Oberlerchner JOB 15 =

Austrian two-seat light aircraft

JOB 15
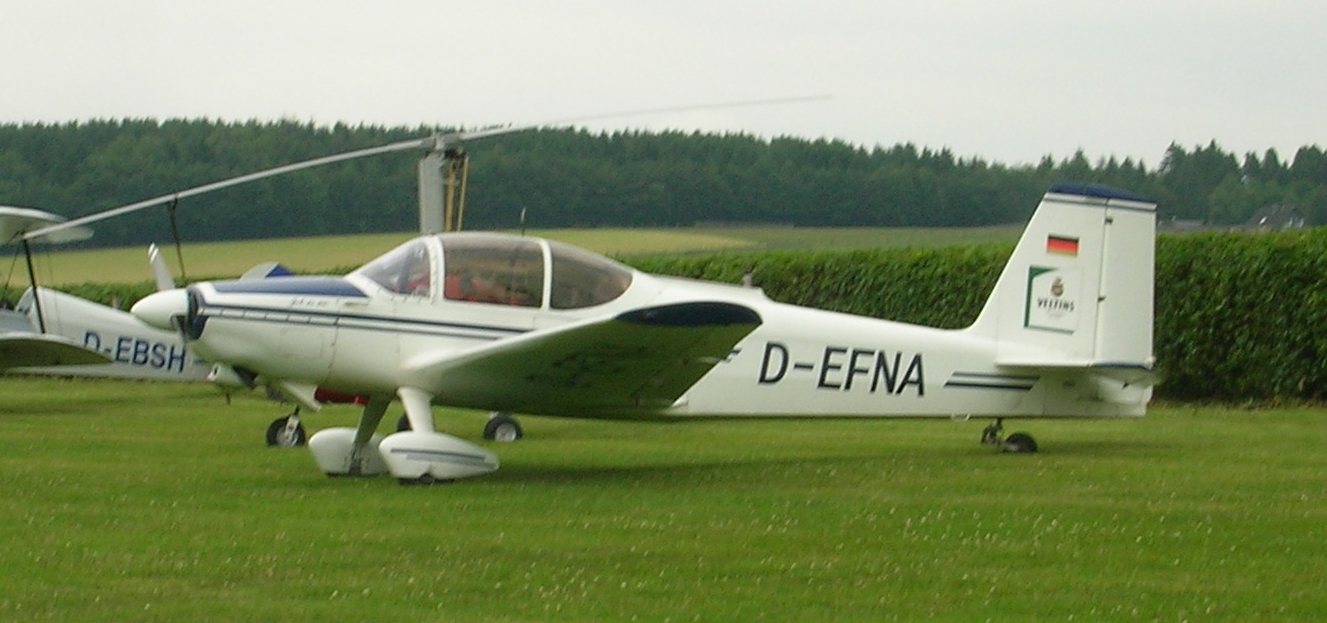
- A JOB 15-180/2

General information
- Type: Two-seat lightplane
- Manufacturer: Josef Oberlerchner Holzindustrie
- Number built: 24

History
- Manufactured: 1962-1966
- Introduction date: 1962
- First flight: 1960
- Developed from: Oberlerchner JOB 5

The Oberlerchner JOB 15 was an Austrian two-seat light aircraft produced by Josef Oberlerchner Holzindustrie, which had previously designed and built gliders.

== Design and development ==
Using experience as sailplane designers and builders, Josef Oberlerchner Holzindustrie determined to create a powered aircraft. The result was the JOB 5, a two-seat side-by-side light aircraft of wooden construction. It first flew in 1958. The company decided to build a slightly larger three-seat production version, the JOB 15. The JOB 15 was a low-winged monoplane of composite construction with fixed tailwheel undercarriage, with a wooden wing and steel-tube fuselage covered in glass-reinforced plastic and fabric. The prototype first flew in 1960 with a 135 hp (101 kW) Avco Lycoming O-290-D2B engine. Three aircraft were built before the a more powerful version, the JOB 15-150, was built with a 150 hp (112 kW) Avco Lycoming O-320-A2B engine. After 11 15-150s had been built an improved version, the JOB 15-150/2, was introduced and ten were built before production ended in the late 1960s.

== Variants ==
JOB 5
Prototype two-seater, 95 hp Continental C90-12F engine, one built
JOB 15
Production three-seater with a 135 hp (101 kW) Avco Lycoming O-290 engine, three built.
JOB 15-150
Re-engined version with a 150 hp (112 kw) Avco Lycoming O-320-A2B engine, 11 built.
JOB 15-150/2
Improved version, ten built.

== Specifications (15-150) ==
Data from Janes's All The World's Aircraft 1969-70

General characteristics

- Crew: 1
- Capacity: 3 passengers
- Length: 7.68 m (25 ft 2 in)
- Wingspan: 10.10 m (33 ft 2 in)
- Height: 1.99 m (6 ft 6 in)
- Wing area: 14.7 m^{2} (158 sq ft)
- Aspect ratio: 6.94:1
- Airfoil: NACA 643-418 at root, NACA 643-412 at tip
- Empty weight: 601 kg (1,325 lb)
- Max takeoff weight: 965 kg (2,127 lb)
- Fuel capacity: 140 L (37 US gal; 31 imp gal)
- Powerplant: 1 × Avco Lycoming O-320-A2B four-cylinder air-cooled horizontally-opposed engine, 110 kW (150 hp)

Performance

- Maximum speed: 235 km/h (146 mph, 127 kn)
- Cruise speed: 195 km/h (121 mph, 105 kn) (economical cruise)
- Stall speed: 70 km/h (43 mph, 38 kn) (flaps down)
- Never exceed speed: 285 km/h (177 mph, 154 kn)
- Range: 1,000 km (620 mi, 540 nmi) with max payload (65% power)
- Service ceiling: 4,500 m (14,800 ft)
- Rate of climb: 4.40 m/s (866 ft/min)
- Takeoff run to 15 m (50 ft): 306 m (1,000 ft)
- Landing run from 15 m (50 ft): 338 m (1,109 ft)
