= Waco Aristocraft =

Aristocraft

General information
- Type: Four-seat cabin monoplane
- National origin: United States
- Manufacturer: Waco Aircraft Company
- Designer: A Francis Arcier
- Number built: 1

History
- First flight: March 1947

The Waco Model W Aristocraft was an American four-seat monoplane, the last aircraft designed and built by the Waco Aircraft Company. It had an unusual configuration with an engine mounted at the front driving a pusher propeller at the rear.

== Design and development ==
The Aristocraft was an attempt by Waco to enter the post-war market for light aircraft. The prototype first flew in March 1947 powered by a 215 hp (160 kW) Franklin 6AL piston engine mounted at the front with a shaft driven pusher propeller at the rear. Of all-metal construction it was a high-wing monoplane with twin fins and rudders, It had a partially retractable tricycle landing gear.

The company had orders for 300 aircraft but decided that the type would need costly development in a shrinking market and only the prototype was completed. Waco sold the design rights and in the 1960s efforts were made to market the type for home-construction.

The sole prototype was eventually purchased in the early 1960s and restored to flight.

== Specifications ==
Data from Aerofiles.com, Jane's all the World's Aircraft 1947

General characteristics

- Crew: 1
- Capacity: 3 pax
- Length: 25 ft 0 in (7.63 m)
- Wingspan: 38 ft 0 in (11.58 m)
- Height: 7 ft 8 in (2.34 m)
- Powerplant: 1 × Franklin 6AL 6-cyl. air-cooled horizontally-opposed piston engine, 215 hp (160 kW) at 2,500 rpm
- Propellers: 2-bladed Hartzell, 7 ft 0 in (2.13 m) diameter reversible pitch propeller

Performance

- Maximum speed: 154 mph (248 km/h, 134 kn)
- Cruise speed: 152 mph (245 km/h, 132 kn) at 5,000 ft (1,500 m)
- Landing speed: 65 mph (105 km/h; 56 kn)
- Stall speed: 55 mph (89 km/h, 48 kn)
- Range: 657 mi (1,057 km, 571 nmi) at 5,000 ft (1,500 m)
- Service ceiling: 17,500 ft (5,300 m)
- Rate of climb: 950 ft/min (4.8 m/s)

== See also ==
Aircraft of comparable role, configuration, and era

- Douglas Cloudster II
- Lockheed Big Dipper
