= Offpiste Aviation =

British aircraft manufacturer

Offpiste Aviation Limited
- Company type: Privately held company
- Industry: Aerospace
- Founded: 1995
- Defunct: 2003
- Fate: Out of business following founder's death
- Headquarters: Dursley, Gloucestershire, United Kingdom
- Key people: Colin Lark
- Products: Hang gliders

Offpiste Aviation Limited (Off The Beaten Track) was a British aircraft manufacturer based in Dursley, Gloucestershire and founded by hang glider competition pilot Colin Lark. The company specialized in the design and manufacture of hang gliders in the form of ready-to-fly aircraft.

The company was founded in 1995 and went out of business when Lark died of cancer on 8 September 2003.

The company was founded to produce the Discovery series of hang gliders, designed by Bill Pain. The Discovery series are termed Sky Floaters, hang gliders designed for slow, local flying, lightness of weight and ease of handling, over high performance and cross-country capability. The series quickly became the best selling hang glider design in the UK by the mid-2000s.

== Aircraft ==
Summary of aircraft built by Offpiste Aviation Limited
Model name	First flight	Number built	Type
Offpiste Discovery			hang glider
