= Orenco D =

1919 American biplane fighter aircraft

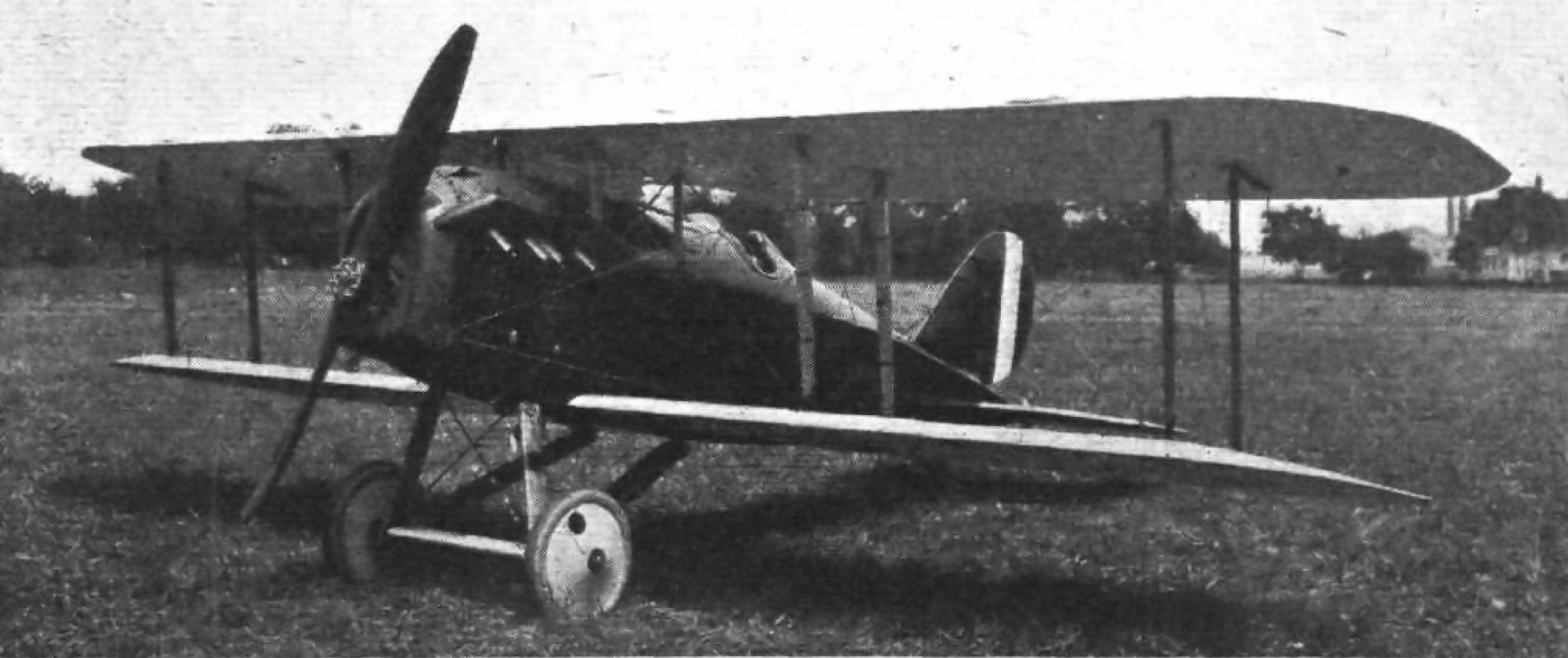

General information
- Type: Fighter
- National origin: United States
- Manufacturer: Orenco/Curtiss Aircraft
- Number built: 54 (4 prototypes, 50 production)

History
- First flight: 1919

The Orenco D was an American biplane fighter aircraft, designed by Orenco and built by Curtiss Aeroplane and Motor Company. It was the first fighter type of completely indigenous design (as opposed to foreign types or American-built versions of foreign types) to enter US military service.

== Development ==
The D prototype was offered to the US Army Air Service at the end of 1918. It was a two-bay biplane of all-wood construction, covered with fabric. It was powered by a 300 hp (224 kW) Hispano-Suiza engine. The pilot of the first flight test, Clarence B. Coombs, gave it a positive evaluation: "This aircraft performs better than the Sopwith Camel and Snipe, the Thomas-Morse, the Nieuport and Morane Parasol, the Spad and S.V.A." The military ordered 50 production aircraft, but put the production order up for bidding. Curtiss Aircraft entered the lowest bid and built the fighter, modifying it slightly with a wider wingspan and redesigned ailerons. The first Curtiss Orenco D flew on 26 August 1921.

== Variants ==
Orenco D
Prototype, four built

Curtiss Orenco D
Production aircraft, 50 built

Orenco D-2
Prototype based on Curtiss Orenco D. three built, under military designation PW-3.

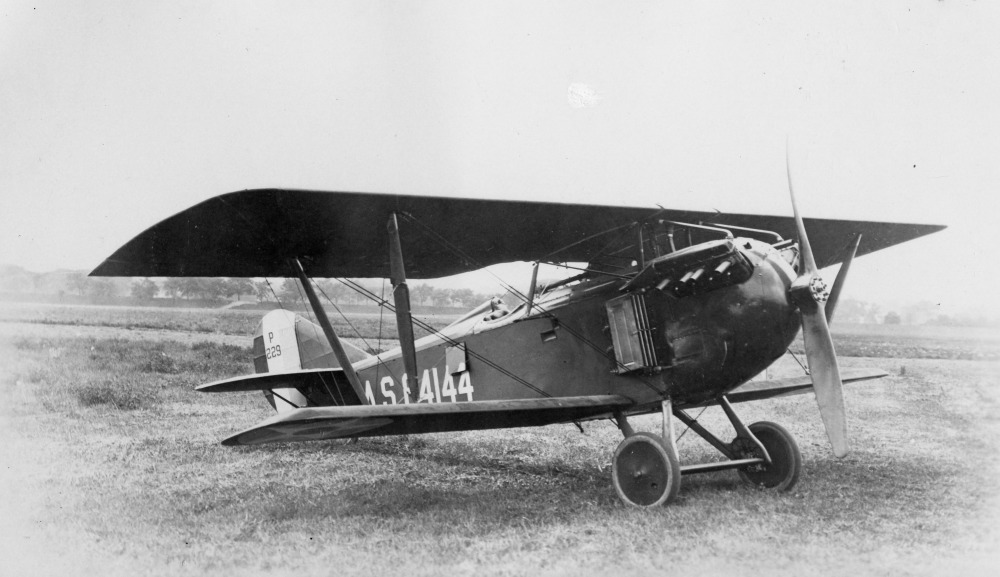
An Orenco D-2 prototype with revised tail surfaces

== Operators ==
United States

- United States Army Air Service

== Specifications ==
Data from: Flight: The Aircraft Engineer & Airships, "Some 'Orenco' (U.S.A) Aeroplanes", 1 April 1920, pp. 363–366.

=== Curtiss Orenco D ===
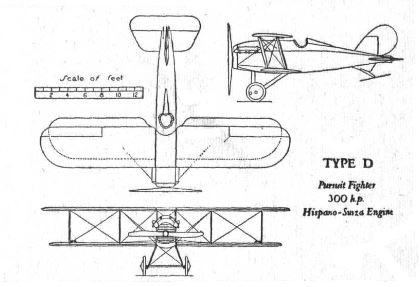

Data quoted here may differ in some respects from that quoted by Angelucci.

==== General characteristics ====
- crew: one
- length: 21 ft 6 in (6.55 m)
- Height: 8 ft 3 in (2.51 m)
- Upper Wing

Span: 30 ft (9.1 m)
Area: 142 sq ft (13.2 m^{2})

- Lower wing

Span: 28 ft (8.5 m)
Area: 119 sq ft (11.1 m^{2})

- Total wing area (including ailerons): 261 sq ft (24.2 m^{2})
- Wing gap: 52 in (1,300 mm)
- Wing stagger: 12 in (300 mm)
- Empty weight: 1,666 lb (756 kg)
- Gross weight: 2,432 lb (1,103 kg)
- Powerplant: one × Wright-Hispano H 300 hp (220 kW)
- Fuel Capacity: 330 lb (150 kg)

==== Performance ====
- Speed

At sea level: 147 mph (237 km/h)
At 10,000 ft (3,000 m): 139 mph (224 km/h)

- Time to climb

To 5,000 ft (1,500 m): 4 min 20 s
To 10,000 ft (3,000 m): 8 min 54 s
To 15,000 ft (4,600 m): 16 min 45 s

- Service ceiling: 12,450 ft (3,790 m)
- Range at full speed: 275 mi (443 km)

==== Armament ====
- 2 × .30 in (7.6 mm) machine guns

=== Orenco D2 ===
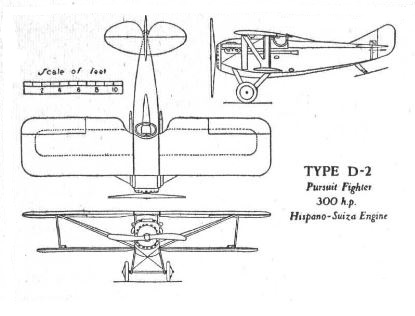

==== General characteristics ====
- crew: one
- length: 21 ft 6 in (6.55 m)
- Height: 8 ft (2.4 m)
- Upper Wing

Span: 28 ft (8.5 m)
Area: 170 sq ft (16 m^{2})

- Lower wing

Span: 25 ft (7.6 m)
Area: 64 sq ft (5.9 m^{2})

- Total wing area (including ailerons): 234 sq ft (21.7 m^{2})
- Wing gap: 49 in (1,200 mm)
- Wing stagger: 27 in (690 mm)
- Empty weight: 1,345 lb (610 kg)
- Gross weight: 2,256 lb (1,023 kg)
- Powerplant: one × Wright-Hispano H 300 hp (220 kW)
- Fuel Capacity: 353 lb (160 kg)

==== Performance ====
- Speed

At sea level: 165 mph (266 km/h)
At 10,000 ft (3,000 m): 158 mph (254 km/h)

- Time to climb

To 5,000 ft (1,500 m): 4 min
To 10,000 ft (3,000 m): 8 min 30 s
To 15,000 ft (4,600 m): 13 min 50 s

- Range at full speed: 330 mi (530 km)
