= Oeffag C.I =

WWI Austria-Hungary military reconnaissance aircraft

General information
- Type: Reconnaissance aircraft
- National origin: Austria-Hungary
- Manufacturer: Oeffag
- Primary user: KuKLFT

History
- Introduction date: 1915
- First flight: 1915

The Oeffag C.I was a military reconnaissance aircraft produced in Austria-Hungary during World War I.

== Development ==
The C.I model was established in 1915 in the Austrian-Hungarian Österreichische Flugzeugfabrik AG in Wiener Neustadt. The design of the aircraft was modeled on the German "C" series Albatros and Brandenburg airplanes. Oeffag CI did not meet the conditions necessary for the combat aircraft and the production of these machines was stopped after producing about 20 copies. In Austro-Hungarian aviation, CI aircraft were directed to aviation schools.

In Poland, there were probably four C.I aircraft, acquired in Małopolska. Two machines served in 7 EM (or EL *), and the other Aviation School in Kraków. Those who were withdrawn from service were probably in the second half of 1920 (from the 7th squadron already in autumn 1919).

== Specifications ==
Data from

General characteristics

- Crew: Two, pilot and observer
- Length: 8.4 m (27 ft 6 in)
- Wingspan: 14.5 m (47 ft 9 in)
- Height: 3.2 m (10 ft 8 in)
- Empty weight: 950 kg (2,094 lb)
- Gross weight: 1,350 kg (2,977 lb)
- Powerplant: 1 × Daimler , 118 kW (160 hp)

Performance

- Maximum speed: 125 km/h (78 mph, 68 kn)
- Endurance: 6 hours
