= Orliński RO-7 Orlik =

RO-7 Orlik

General information
- Type: Homebuilt aircraft
- National origin: Poland
- Manufacturer: Roman Orliński
- Designer: Roman Orliński
- Number built: 1

History
- First flight: 22 February 1987

The Orliński RO-7 Orlik (Eaglet) was a prize-winning Polish home-built aircraft, first flown in 1987. It was restored to flight, with improvements, in 2003.

== Design and development ==
Roman Orliński began to design the Orlik in the spring of 1984. Its first flight was made on 22 February 1987.

It has a two part, low, rectangular plan, wooden wing set with 5° of dihedral and built around a single main spar. Plywood skin ahead of the spar around the leading edge forms a torsion-resistant D-box; behind the spar the wing is fabric covered. Its ailerons, mounted on an auxiliary spar, fill a little under half the span.

The forward fuselage has a welded steel-tube structure but the rear is a wooden monocoque; throughout, the section is essentially rectangular with rounded decking. Behind the metal-covered, conventionally mounted engine, a Walter Mikron III salvaged from an earlier project, the forward fuselage is ply covered. The cockpit is over the wing, normally enclosed by a two-part canopy though it can be flown open with only its windscreen in place.

The Orlik's tail is conventional and angular, its tall, trapezoidal profile fin carrying a similarly shaped, balanced and tabbed rudder. Its rectangular plan tailplane is mounted on the top of the extreme rear fuselage, placing its straight-edged, tapered, one-piece, tabbed elevator behind the rudder. The rudder is entirely fabric-covered and the elevator largely so.

The landing gear is conventional and fixed, with steel tube, V-strut main legs hinged from the lower fuselage longerons. Each leg is cross-linked to the top of the other with a steel rod and has an elastic shock absorber within the fuselage. Originally the rather small wheels were exposed. The castoring tailwheel was on a long, trailing spring.

The Orlik proved to be easy and pleasant to fly. Criticisms were confined to its landing limitations; the absence of flaps meant a shallow approach, the absence of brakes could be a problem at short strips and its small wheels did not suit rough surfaces.

After a period of disuse the Orlik was quickly restored to flight in mid-2003. Photographs from that year show the wheels enclosed in spats and flaps which occupy all the trailing edge inboard of the aileron. It underwent a series of quantitative tests with results good enough to encourage Orliński's son to start a second airframe in 2004. It is not known if this was completed.

== Operational history ==
Five months after its first flight in 1987 the Orlik appeared in public for the first time at the 6th Amateur Constructors' Rally. It made a good impression and took one of the two first prizes. After restoration and tests in 2003, it flew in public at an Air Force open day in September 2010.

== Specifications ==
Data from Jane's All the World's Aircraft 1990-91 except where noted.

General characteristics

- Crew: one
- Length: 5.50 m (18 ft 1 in)
- Wingspan: 7.60 m (24 ft 11 in)
- Height: 1.95 m (6 ft 5 in)
- Wing area: 8.75 m^{2} (94.2 sq ft)
- Airfoil: NACA 23012
- Empty weight: 220 kg (485 lb)
- Gross weight: 320 kg (705 lb)
- Fuel capacity: 30 L (6.6 imp gal; 7.9 US gal)
- Powerplant: 1 × Walter Mikron III four-cylinder, air-cooled, inverted inline, 48.5 kW (65.0 hp)
- Propellers: 2-bladed SRO-10, 1.47 m (4 ft 10 in) diameter

Performance

- Maximum speed: 150 km/h (93 mph, 81 kn) at sea level
- Cruise speed: 90 km/h (56 mph, 49 kn) economical, at sea level. Later (2003) tests reported 115 km/h (71 mph; 62 kn) at an unspecified altitude.
- Stall speed: 71 km/h (44 mph, 38 kn)
- Range: 400 km (250 mi, 220 nmi) with 20 min reserves
- Rate of climb: 5 m/s (980 ft/min) at sea level
