= Orenco B =

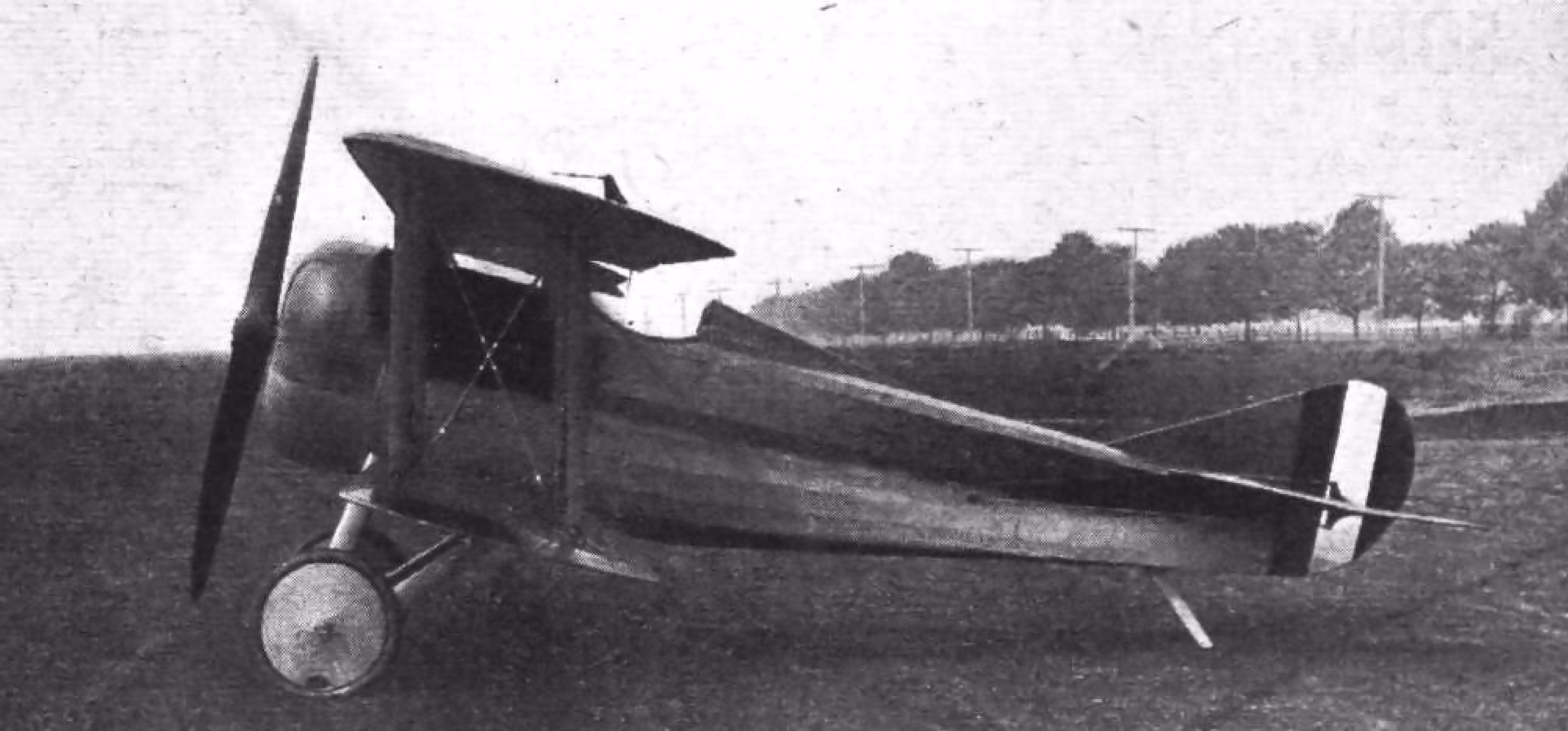

General information
- Type: Fighter aircraft
- National origin: United States of America
- Manufacturer: Orenco
- Designer: Etienne Dormoy

History
- First flight: 1918

The Orenco B was a prototype American fighter aircraft of World War I. It was a single-engined, single-seat biplane that flew in 1918. Although it demonstrated good performance, it did not enter large scale service.

== Design and development ==
The Ordnance Engineering Corporation (Note: To avoid the assumption that it was part of the US.Army, the company used the name Orenco from 1919.) of Baldwin, Long Island, designed and built its first aircraft, the Type A, a two-seat trainer in 1917, although no production followed. To design its second aircraft, a single-seat fighter, it acquired the services of Frenchman Etienne Dormoy, a member of the French Aeronautical Mission to the United States, who had previously worked for SPAD. (Note: Dormoy was not the only member of the mission to design fighter aircraft while in the United States. Georges Lepère designed the LUSAC-11 two-seat fighter for the Engineering Division of the United States Army Air Service.) The design, the Type B, was a single-engined tractor biplane of wooden construction. It was powered by a single 160 hp (120 kW) Gnome Monosoupape 9N rotary engine and had two-bay wings. Planned armament was three Marlin machine guns, one under the upper wing and two under the lower wings. (Note: The planned three-Marlin armament was never fitted, although it was briefly fitted with three Fiat-Revelli Modello 1914 machine guns for testing.)

The first prototype made its maiden flight in early 1918. It demonstrated good performance, reaching a speed of 135 mph (117 kn; 217 km/h), and four aircraft were ordered by the Aviation Section, U.S. Signal Corps, along with five of the closely related Type C fighter trainer, the first being delivered in March 1918. Despite this, the type was not adopted further, as the 160 hp Gnome did not go into production in the United States, and the US Army decided to build European fighters under license instead. It is uncertain whether all four Type Bs were completed, with some sources indicating only one type B having been built.

== Specifications ==
Data from Some "Orenco" (U.S.A.) Aeroplanes

General characteristics

- Crew: one
- Length: 18 ft 10 in (5.74 m)
- Upper wingspan: 26 ft 0 in (7.92 m)
- Lower wingspan: 23 ft 0 in (7.01 m)
- Height: 7 ft 4 in (2.24 m)
- Wing area: 180 sq ft (17 m^{2})
- Empty weight: 985 lb (447 kg)
- Gross weight: 1,290 lb (585 kg)
- Fuel capacity: 38 US gal (140 L)
- Powerplant: 1 × Gnome Monosoupape 9N nine-cylinder rotary engine, 150 hp (110 kW)

Performance

- Maximum speed: 135 mph (217 km/h, 117 kn) at sea level
- Range: 202 mi (325 km, 176 nmi)
- Time to altitude: 3 min 20 s to 5,000 ft (1,500 m)

Armament

- Guns: 3× Fiat-Revelli Modello 1914 machine guns
