= Oeffag G =

General information
- Type: Reconnaissance flying boat
- National origin: Austro-Hungarian Empire
- Manufacturer: Oeffag (Oesterreichische Flugzeugfabrik AG )
- Designer: Dipl-Ing.Mickl
- Primary user: Kaiserlich und Königlich Seefliegerkorps (Imperial and Royal Naval Aviation) (K.u.K. Seefliegerkorps) (Imperial and Royal Naval Aviation)
- Number built: 12 (including 2 not completed)

The Oeffag G, sometimes known as the Oeffag Type G or Oeffag-Mickl G, was a three-engined reconnaissance flying boat built in Austria during the First World War and deployed by the Kaiserlich und Königlich Seefliegerkorps (K.u.K. Seefliegerkorps) (Imperial and Royal naval aviation).

== Design and development ==
The Oeffag G was a relatively large flying boat, following the design practises used for the smaller Lohner flying boats developed in Austria contemporaneously. The aircraft was a biplane with the wings mounted above a slender all-wood monocoque fuselage/hull, with the biplane tail unit mounted above the extreme tail end of the fuselage. The three pusher engines were mounted in open nacelles, supported by struts, between the main-planes. Early aircraft were armed with a large 66 mm (2.60 in) D/20 cannon in the front cockpit and later machines had a machine gun fitted on a flexible mount aft of the wings.

== Operational history ==
Most of the ten aircraft completed saw service with the K.u.K. Seefliegerkorps, from 1915, operating principally from the Pola Naval station, (now Pula), on the Istria peninsula, in what is now Croatia.

== Variants ==
The Oeffag G was developed as each aircraft was built, but the major differences involved the powerplants and the tail unit.

G.1 and G.3
powered by 150 kW (200 hp) Hiero 6 cylinder water-cooled inline piston engines, built with the original biplane tail unit mounted on struts above the fuselage, fitted with triple rudders.
G.4 to G.7
powered by 185 kW (248 hp) Austro-Daimler 6 cylinder engines, with the original biplane tail unit
G.8 and G.9
powered by 230 kW (310 hp) Hiero 6 engines, introducing a monoplane strut mounted tailplane with a single fin and rudder mounted on the fuselage and tailplane.
G.10 and G.11
aircraft not completed
G.12
powered by 185 kW (248 hp) Austro-Daimler 6 cylinder engines, with the later monoplane tail unit.

== Operators ==
Austro-Hungarian Empire

- Kaiserlich und Königlich Seefliegerkorps

== Specifications (estimated) ==
Data from

General characteristics

- Crew: 3 (pilot, commander, gunner)
- Length: 17.1 m (56 ft 1 in)
- Wingspan: 24.36 m (79 ft 11 in)
- Height: 5.46 m (17 ft 11 in)
- Gross weight: 4,000 kg (8,818 lb)
- Powerplant: 3 × Austro-Daimler 185hp 6-cyl. 6-cylinder water-cooled in-line piston engines, 138 kW (185 hp) each
- Propellers: 2-bladed wooden fixed pitch pusher propellers

Performance

- Maximum speed: 110 km/h (68 mph, 59 kn)
- Time to altitude: 600 m (2,000 ft) in 45 minutes

Armament

- 1x flexible 66 mm (2.60 in) D/20 cannon in the nose - early machines only.
- 1x flexible machine gun amidships - late machines only
