= Putilov Stal-2 =

Stal-2
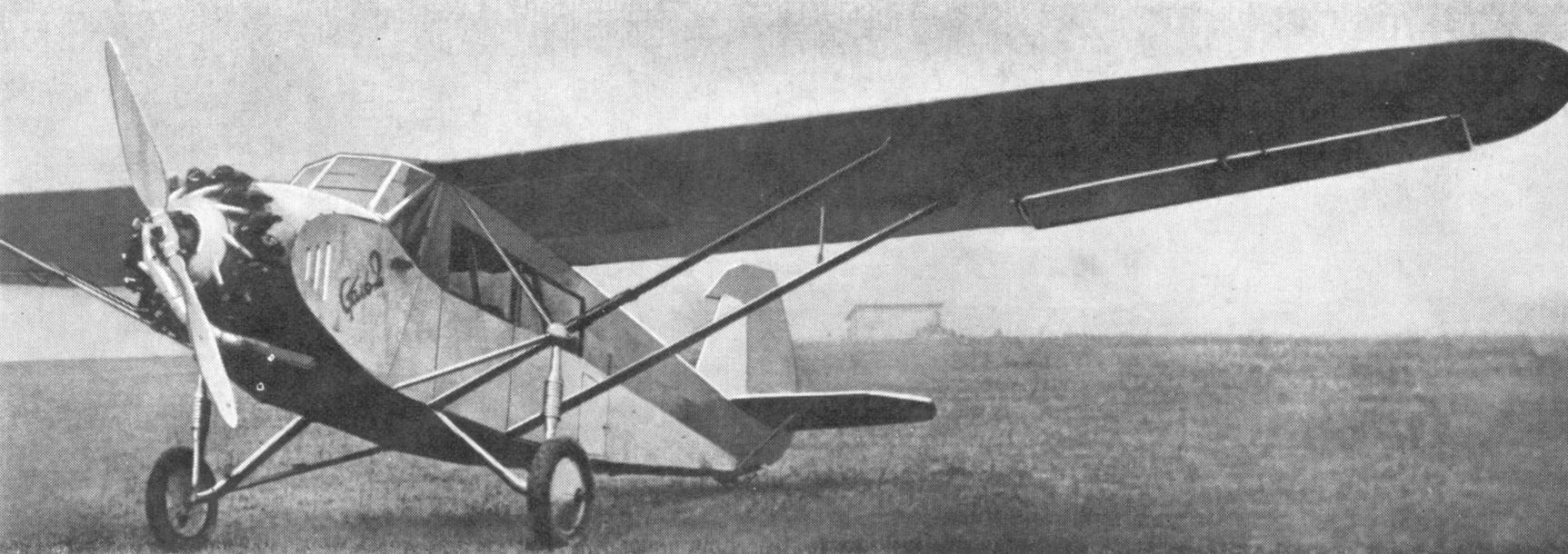
- Stal-2

General information
- Type: Airliner
- National origin: USSR
- Manufacturer: OOS, later at GAZ-81
- Designer: A.I.Putilov
- Primary user: Aeroflot
- Number built: 111 by 1935

History
- First flight: 11 October 1931
- Variant: Putilov Stal-3

The Stal-2 was a Russian mid-range passenger aircraft.

== Development and design ==
The Stal-2 was designed by the OOS (Otdel Opytnogo Samolyetostroeniya – section for experimental aircraft construction), the part of the NII GVF (Nauchno-issledovatel'sky Institut Grazdahnskovo Vozdushnogo Flota – civil air fleet scientific research institute), and built at Tushino GAZ-81 (Gosudarstvenny Aviatsionnyy Zavod – Tushino state aviation factory). It was a high-wing braced monoplane with an enclosed cockpit and passenger cabin, constructed of Enerzh-6 stainless steel. Trial flights began in 1931, but due to the experimental technology being used in its design and construction, production did not begin until 1934. 111 were produced before being replaced in 1935 on the production line by the Stal-3. The prototype was powered by an imported Wright J-6, early production aircraft used Bessonov M-26 engines with the bulk of production using Nazarov MG-31 engines.
In 1934 the plane was shown at the 14th Paris Air Show.

== Variants ==
- Stal-2 bis – A single Stal-2 bis was built with frise ailerons.

== Operators ==
Soviet Union

- Aeroflot

== Specifications ==
Data from

General characteristics

- Crew: one
- Capacity: four passengers
- Length: 9.74 m (31 ft 11.5 in)
- Wingspan: 16.2 m (53 ft 1.75 in)
- Wing area: 31.0 m^{2} (333.7 sq ft)
- Empty weight: 1,030 kg (2,270 lb)
- Gross weight: 1,800 kg (3,968 lb)
- Powerplant: 1 × M-26 or MG-31 , 224 kW (300 hp)

Performance

- Maximum speed: 200 km/h (124.3 mph, 108.0 kn)
- Cruise speed: 170 km/h (106 mph, 92 kn)
- Range: 750 km (466 mi, 405 nmi)
- Service ceiling: 5,000 m (16,400 ft)

== See also ==
Aircraft of comparable role, configuration, and era

- Fokker F.VII
