= Nikolay Putilov =

Russian engineer

- Никола́й Ива́нович Пути́лов
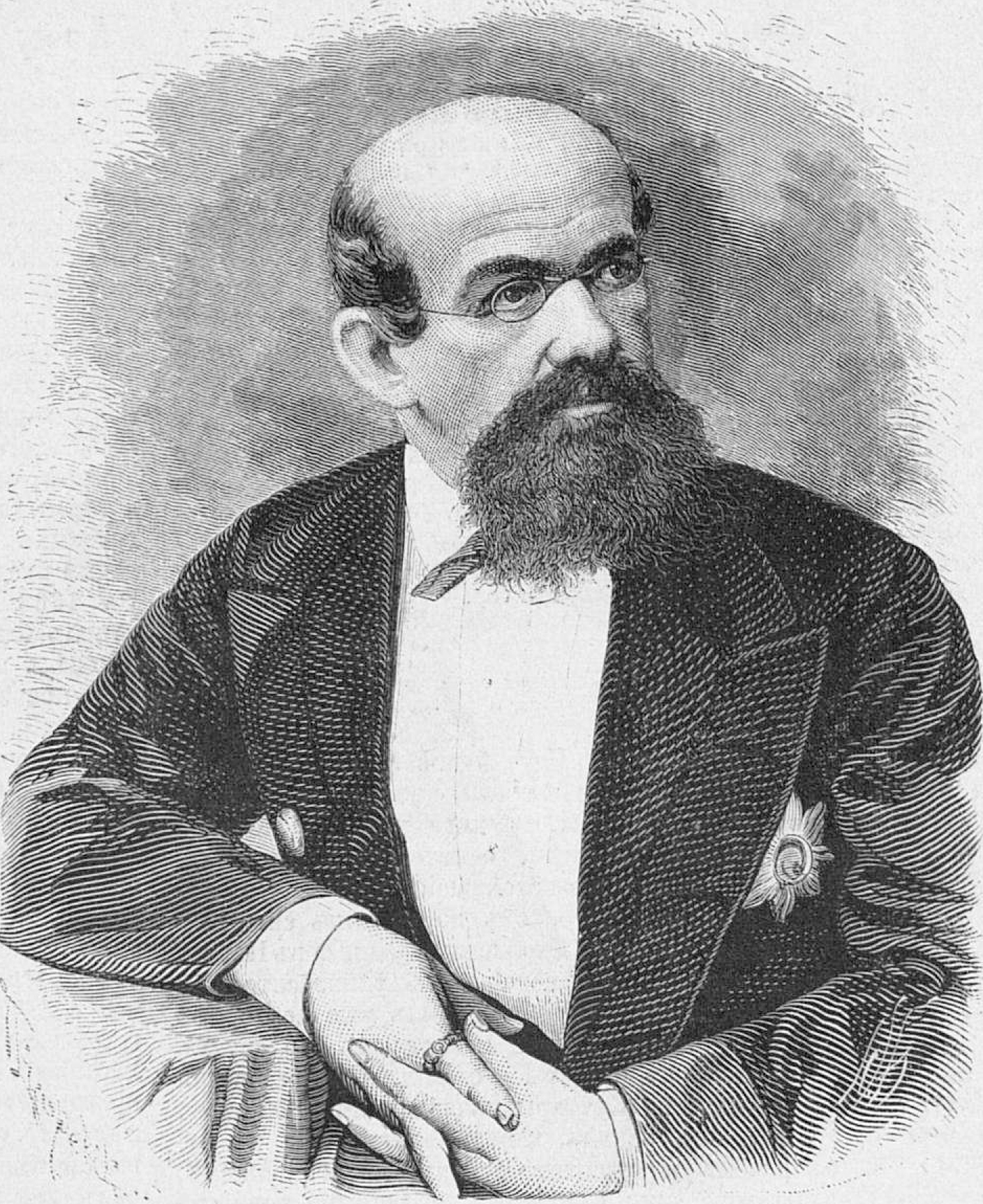
- Nikolay Putilov drawing
- Born: 1820; Novgorod Governorate, Russian Empire
- Died: April 18, 1880 (aged 59–60) (Old Style date); St. Petersburg
- Occupations: Engineer, industrialist
- Known for: Founder of the Putilov Company (now the Kirov Plant)

Nikolay Ivanovich Putilov (Russian: Никола́й Ива́нович Пути́лов; 1820 – 1880) was a Russian engineer, industrialist and founder of the Putilov Company (now the Kirov Plant). He was one of Russia's greatest metallurgists and one of the greatest figures of early Russian Industry.

== Early life and military service ==
Putilov came from a family of minor nobility, he was born in the village of Yevryukhino in the Borisov district. His father was an invalid veteran of the Patriotic war of 1812. Putilov graduated from the Sea Cadet Corps in 1840 and remained at this college as a mathematics teacher. Putilov was engaged in scientific work working on ballistics with academician Ostrogradski, and transferred to the engineer corps in the Crimea for health reasons. In 1848 he returned to St Petersburg to work as a special officer in the central shipbuilding department.

During the Crimean War Putilov came to the notice of Grand Duke Konstantin Nikolayevich as an excellent organiser and set up a workshop for building steam machinery, boilers and propellers for gunboats and other warships. Putilov's factory built 67 steam-screw gunboats for the defence of Kronstadt in 1855, together with 14 corvettes and clippers. Putilov also built three floating docks and modernised the gunpowder mill at Kronstadt.

Putilov was rewarded for these achievements by being promoted in rank to Court Counsellor with the appointment as a senior officer on special assignments of the Shipbuilding Department), he was also awarded the Order of St. Stanislaus II class.

== Career ==
Putilov retired from government service in August 1857 and set up four steel foundries and was the first concern to produce steel from scrap on an industrial scale in the Russian Empire. In 1863 Putilov set up a gun foundry in partnership with Obukhov and Kudryavchev, which became the Obukhov Plant. Putilov subsequently developed cast iron explosive shells and bought a failing iron works in 1868. This plant was expanded and in 1872 was renamed the Putilov Factory, it became the largest producer of locomotives and rails in Russia. In 1870 he established the Putilov railway company to improve linkage between the docks and his factories. He was further promoted to State Councillor.

In 1874 Putilov's company began the construction of the mercantile harbour in St Peterburg and the deep water channel linking Kronstadt to the harbour, which was approved by Tsar Alexander II. This project proved challenging, eventually bankrupted the company and was completed in 1885, after Putilov's death. Putilov's company was bailed out by the Russian Imperial government and became a Russian industrial giant in the later part of the 19th century.

== Death ==
Putilov died in 1880 and was buried near the dam for the seaport, He was reburied in a new church near the site in 1907.
