= Putilov Stal-5 =

Stal-5
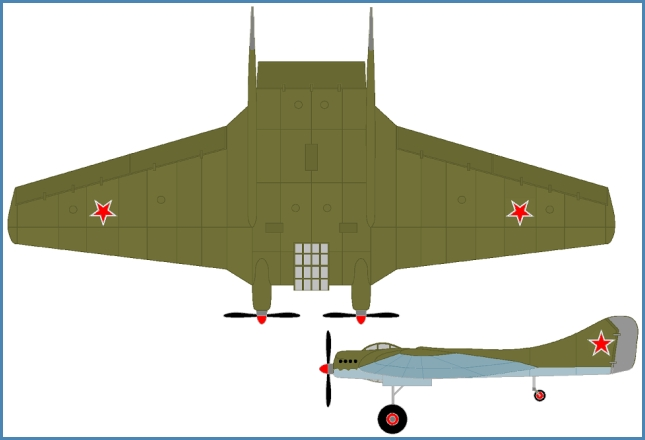

General information
- Type: Transport
- National origin: USSR
- Designer: A.I. Putilov

History
- First flight: late 1935 (1/4scale model)

The Stal-5 (Stal – steel) was a transport aircraft designed in the USSR from 1933.

== Development ==
In 1933 Putilov started the design of a flying wing 18 passenger transport with the intention of achieving very high levels of efficiency. The broad rectangular centre section housed the cabin and a fully glazed cockpit on the centre line, with long and shallow fins at its extremities and a large elevator at the trailing edge. The tapered outer wings carried the slotted flaps and ailerons. The structure was to be entirely formed from Enerzh-6 stainless steel tubing and rolled sections covered with bakelite-impregnated ply (similar to Delta-wood) on the centre section and fabric elsewhere. Structural test specimens were tested, including a complete wing spar, and a 1/4 scale model powered by two 45 hp (34 kW) Salmson engines was built and flown by V.V. Karpov and Ya.G. Paul in 1935. The results of the scale model test flights were not encouraging, displaying poor handling and stability. After adjustments failed to yield better results further work was abandoned.

== Variants ==
- KhB - (Khimichyevskii Boyevik – chemical fighter) A chemical warfare variant was planned but was abandoned along with the Stal-5.

== Specifications (Stal-5) ==
Data from Gunston, Bill. "Encyclopaedia of Russian Aircraft 1875-1995". London:Osprey. 1995. ISBN 1-85532-405-9

General characteristics

- Crew: 2
- Capacity: 18
- Length: 12.5 m (41 ft 0 in)
- Wingspan: 23.0 m (75 ft 5.5 in)
- Wing area: 120 m^{2} (1,292 sq ft)
- Empty weight: 1,672 kg (3,686 lb)
- Gross weight: 8,000 kg (17,640 lb)
- Powerplant: 2 × M-34F , 611.4 kW (820 hp) each

Performance

== See also ==
Aircraft of comparable role, configuration, and era

- Burnelli UB-14
- Kalinin K-12

Related lists

- List of aircraft
