= Putilov Stal-3 =

Stal-3

General information
- Type: Transport
- National origin: USSR
- Designer: A.I. Putilov
- Number built: 79

History
- First flight: 1933
- Developed from: Putilov Stal-2

The Stal-3 (Stal – steel) was a transport aircraft designed and built in the USSR from 1933.

== Development ==
The Stal-3 was an enlarged development of the Putilov Stal-2, designed at the OOS (Otdel Opytnogo Samolyetostroeniya - section for experimental aircraft construction), with a simplified structure which reduced manufacturing man-hours and structural weight, whilst increasing the design load factor. The layout of the aircraft was very similar to the Stal-2, but featured larger dimensions, slotted flaps, a wide chord engine cowling, slotted ailerons, and spatted wheels with brakes, or skis depending on season.

Flight testing began in 1933 with acceptable results, leading to a production order for 79. The Stal-3 was an important aircraft with the GVF / Aeroflot until 1941, continuing to give service on utility duties with Aeroflot and the Soviet Air Force.

== Operators ==
Mongolia

- Mongolian People's Aviation

Soviet Union

- Aeroflot
- Soviet Air Force

== Specifications (Stal-3) ==
Data from Gunston, Bill. "Encyclopaedia of Russian Aircraft 1875-1995". London:Osprey. 1995. ISBN 1-85532-405-9

General characteristics

- Crew: one/two
- Capacity: 6/7
- Length: 10.68 m (35 ft 0.5 in)
- Wingspan: 17.02 m (55 ft 10 in)
- Wing area: 34.8 m^{2} (364.6 sq ft)
- Empty weight: 1,672 kg (3,686 lb)
- Gross weight: 2,817 kg (6,210 lb)
- Powerplant: 1 × M-22 , 358 kW (480 hp)

Performance

- Range: 940 km (584 mi, 507 nmi)
- Service ceiling: 5,340 m (17,250 ft)
- Rate of climb: 3.333 m/s (656.2 ft/min)

== See also ==
Aircraft of comparable role, configuration, and era

- Ford-Stout 2AT
- Fokker F.VII

Related lists

- List of aircraft of World War II
- List of aircraft
