= Orenco IL-1 =

American liaison aircraft

General information
- Type: Liaison biplane
- National origin: United States
- Manufacturer: Orenco
- Primary user: United States Army
- Number built: 2

History
- First flight: March 21, 1921

The Orenco IL-1 was an American two-seat liaison biplane built for the United States Army by the Ordnance Engineering Corporation (Orenco). The Model E-2 was a conventional biplane powered by a 400 hp (298 kW) Liberty 12 engine. Ordered on January 26, 1920, and designated IL-1 (Infantry Liaison) by the Army. First flown in March 1921, two aircraft were built and evaluated by the Army at McCook Field as P-147 and P-168, but the type did not enter production.

== Specifications ==
Data from

General characteristics

- Crew: 2
- Length: 32 ft 0 in (9.75 m)
- Wingspan: 46 ft 0 in (14.02 m)
- Height: 11 ft 10 in (3.61 m)
- Wing area: 600 sq ft (56 m^{2})
- Empty weight: 3,428 lb (1,555 kg)
- Gross weight: 5,046 lb (2,289 kg)
- Powerplant: 1 × Liberty 12 , 400 hp (300 kW)

Performance

- Maximum speed: 130 mph (210 km/h, 110 kn) at sea level
- Range: 406 mi (653 km, 353 nmi)
- Time to altitude:
  - 14 minutes to 10,000 ft (3,000 m)
  - 29 minutes to 15,000 ft (4,600 m)
