= Ozone Enzo =

Enzo
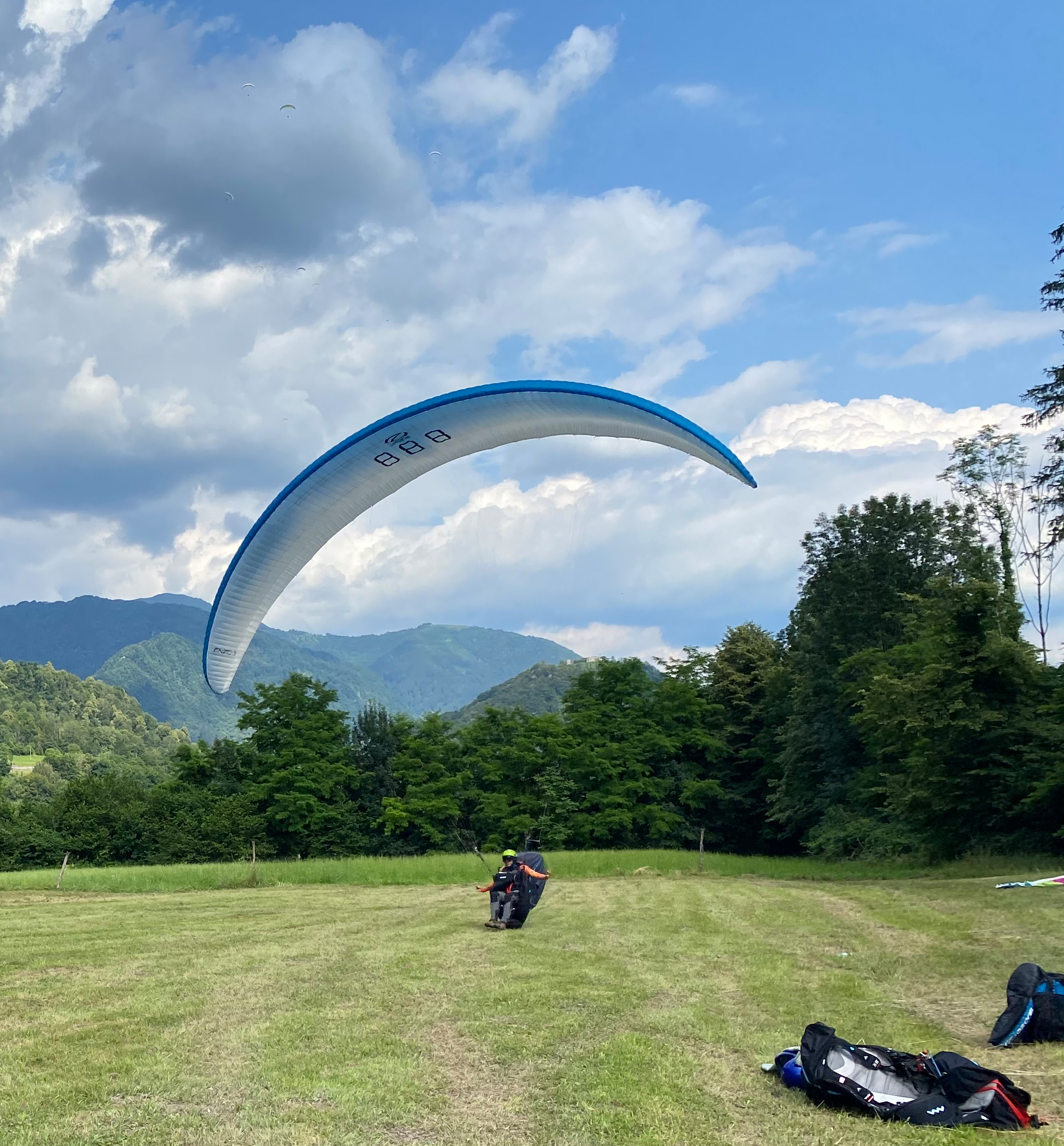

General information
- Type: Paraglider
- National origin: France
- Manufacturer: Ozone Gliders
- Designer: Luc Armant
- Status: In production (Enzo 3, 2020)

History
- Manufactured: Since 2011

The Ozone Enzo is an Anglo-French single-place two-line competition paraglider that was designed by Luc Armant and produced by Ozone Gliders. Two-line gliders have only A and B lines and lack the C or D lines traditionally used on paragliders, in an attempt to reduce aerodynamic drag. In 2020 the Enzo remained in production as the Enzo 3 variant.

== Design and development ==
The Enzo was designed as a competition glider. Until 2011, top level competition paragliders used to compete in an "open class", a class of paragliders that did not require certification except for a mandatory load test of the lines. This resulted in very fast, but unsafe paragliders. After a series of fatal accidents, multiple national paragliding organizations made EN 926 certifications mandatory for wings used in competitions, essentially banning the open class. Manufacturers were now tasked with creating competition wings that would get an EN certification while still performing well. Ozone's take on this was the Enzo, with the name not only being a nod to Enzo Ferrari, but also a partial anagram of the company's name, and the 'EN' certification it achieved.

The Enzo and its variants dominated the paragliding competition scene that followed the end of the open class, with the only major competitors being the Gin Boomerang and the Niviuk Icepeak. This trend continued throughout the 2010 years— the 2019 paragliding world championship saw 83 of 150 pilots flying an Enzo 3, with only two of the top 20 pilots flying something else.

The design has progressed through three generations of models as of 2020, the original Enzo and then Enzo 2 and 3, each improving on the last. The models are each named for their relative size.

The Enzo 3 is made from Dominico DOKDO 30D MF / Porcher 7000 E71 cloth on the upper surface, with Dominico DOKDO 30D MF / Porcher 7000 E71 on the lower wing surface. The ribs are Porcher 9017 E29 / Porcher 7000 E91. The upper lines are Edelrid 8000U 130/090/070/050/025kg, with the middle and lower lines all Edelrid 8000U.

== Variants ==
Enzo
Size	Flat area (m2)	Flat aspect ratio	In flight weight range (Kg)	Certification
S	22	7.55	90-105	D
M	23.7	7.55	100-115	D
L	25.7	7.55	110-125	D

Enzo 2
Size	Flat area (m2)	Flat aspect ratio	In flight weight range (Kg)	Certification
XS	20.3	7.55	85-95	CCC
S	22	7.55	90-105	CCC
M	23.7	7.55	95-115	CCC
L	25.7	7.55	105-125	CCC

Enzo 3
Size	Flat area (m2)	Flat aspect ratio	In flight weight range (Kg)	Certification
XXS	19.1	7.55	80-90	CCC
XS	20.3	7.55	85-95	CCC
S	22	7.55	90-105	CCC
M	23.7	7.55	95-115	CCC
L	25.7	7.55	105-125	CCC
XL	26.7	7.55	115-130	CCC

== Specifications (Enzo 3 L) ==
General characteristics

- Crew: one
- Wingspan: 13.9 m (45 ft 7 in)
- Wing area: 28.79 m^{2} (309.9 sq ft)
- Aspect ratio: 7.55:1
