= Putilov Stal-11 =

Stal-11

General information
- Type: High-Speed Transport / Reconnaissance Aircraft
- National origin: USSR
- Manufacturer: OOS (Otdel Opytnogo Samolyetostroeniya - section for experimental aircraft construction)
- Number built: 1

History
- First flight: Autumn 1936

The Stal-11 (Stal – steel) was a high speed transport aircraft / reconnaissance aircraft designed and built in the USSR from 1933.

== Development ==
The Stal-11 was intended to carry four passengers with mail and baggage as well as fulfil a military reconnaissance role. The Stal-11 was constructed using an Enerzh-6 stainless steel built-up truss covered with Delta-wood for the fuselage, and an all-wood wing with built-up ribs. Two spars and very smooth skinning completed the structure. The prototype was completed in the autumn of 1936, flight trials commencing shortly after, with wheels and skis. Results of the approximately 300 flight tests were promising but the aircraft was expensive to build, with high running costs so no production was authorised.

== Specifications (Stal-11 ==
Data from Gunston, Bill. "Encyclopaedia of Russian Aircraft 1875-1995". London:Osprey. 1995. ISBN 1-85532-405-9

General characteristics

- Crew: one
- Capacity: four passengers
- Length: 12.5 m (41 ft 0 in)
- Wingspan: 15 m (49 ft 2.5 in)
- Wing area: 31 m^{2} (333.7 sq ft)
- Empty weight: 1,830 kg (4,034 lb)
- Gross weight: 2,700 kg (5,952 lb)
- Powerplant: 1 × M-100A , 626.4 or 641.3 kW (840 or 860 hp)

Performance

- Maximum speed: 430 km/h (267 mph, 232 kn)
- Cruise speed: 370 km/h (230 mph, 200 kn)
- Range: 1,000 km (621 mi, 540 nmi)
- Service ceiling: 8,000 m (26,250 ft)

== See also ==
Aircraft of comparable role, configuration, and era

- Lockheed Vega

Related lists

- List of aircraft
