= Olympic Desert Eagle =

American homebuilt aircraft

Desert Eagle

General information
- Type: Homebuilt aircraft
- National origin: United States
- Manufacturer: Olympic Ultralights
- Status: Production completed
- Number built: at least one

The Olympic Desert Eagle was an American homebuilt aircraft that was designed and produced by Olympic Ultralights of Port Angeles, Washington. When it was available the aircraft was supplied as a kit for amateur construction.

== Design and development ==
The Desert Eagle featured a strut-braced high-wing, a two-seats-in-side-by-side configuration semi-enclosed cockpit, fixed tricycle landing gear without wheel pants and a single engine in pusher configuration.

The aircraft was made from bolted-together aluminum tubing, with its flying surfaces covered in Dacron sailcloth. Its 33.00 ft (10.1 m) span wing which mounted flaps, had an area of 165.0 sq ft (15.33 m^{2}) and was supported by "V" struts and jury struts. The cabin width was 50 in (130 cm). The acceptable power range was 65 to 90 hp (48 to 67 kW) and the standard engine used was a 80 hp (60 kW) Motavia powerplant.

The Desert Eagle had a typical empty weight of 495 lb (225 kg) and a gross weight of 1,200 lb (540 kg), giving a useful load of 705 lb (320 kg). With standard full fuel of 10 U.S. gallons (38 L; 8.3 imp gal) the payload for the pilot, passenger and baggage was 645 lb (293 kg).

The standard day, sea level, no-wind takeoff run with a 80 hp (60 kW) engine was 200 ft (61 m) and the landing roll was 150 ft (46 m).

Factory options included optional fuel tanks of 20 U.S. gallons (76 L; 17 imp gal) and 55 U.S. gallons (210 L; 46 imp gal) capacity. The manufacturer estimated the construction time from the supplied kit to be 240 hours.

== Operational history ==
In February 2015, no examples were currently registered in the United States with the Federal Aviation Administration, as the sole one's registration had expired on 30 September 2013.

== Variants ==
Desert Eagle
Base model
Desert Eagle Ag-Wagon
Agricultural aircraft model reported as under development in 1998

== Specifications (Desert Eagle) ==
Data from AeroCrafter

General characteristics

- Crew: one
- Capacity: one passenger
- Length: 21 ft 6 in (6.55 m)
- Wingspan: 33 ft 0 in (10.06 m)
- Wing area: 165.0 sq ft (15.33 m^{2})
- Empty weight: 465 lb (211 kg)
- Gross weight: 1,200 lb (544 kg)
- Fuel capacity: 10 U.S. gallons (38 L; 8.3 imp gal) standard with 20 U.S. gallons (76 L; 17 imp gal) and 55 U.S. gallons (210 L; 46 imp gal) optional
- Powerplant: 1 × Motavia aircraft engine, 80 hp (60 kW)
- Propellers: 3-bladed composite

Performance

- Maximum speed: 110 mph (180 km/h, 96 kn)
- Cruise speed: 85 mph (137 km/h, 74 kn)
- Stall speed: 35 mph (56 km/h, 30 kn) flaps down
- Range: 255 mi (410 km, 222 nmi)
- Service ceiling: 16,000 ft (4,900 m)
- Rate of climb: 600 ft/min (3.0 m/s)
- Wing loading: 7.3 lb/sq ft (36 kg/m^{2})
