= Burovaya Kompaniya Eurasia =

Drilling company in Russia

Burovaya Kompaniya Eurasia LLC
- Industry: Oilfield services
- Predecessor: LUKOIL
- Founded: December 1, 2004
- Headquarters: 40, 2 Ulitsa Narodnogo Opolcheniya, Moscow 123298, Russia, Moscow, Russia
- Area served: West Siberia, Volga-Ural, Timan-Pechora
- Key people: Alexander Bogachev (CEO)
- Services: Onshore drilling services, offshore drilling services
- Revenue: ▲US$1.8 billion (2010)
- Net income: ▲US$207 million (2010)
- Total assets: ▲US$1.95 billion (2010)
- Number of employees: 18,000
- Website: https://www.bke.ru/

Burovaya Kompaniya Eurasia LLC (OOO BKE, Limited Liability Company Evraziya) is a drilling company based in Moscow, Russia. Burovaya Kompaniya Eurasia is Offshore & Onshore oil drilling services company.

One of the largest independent drilling companies in Russia by the number of drilled meters, it engages in drilling, construction, repair, and reconstruction of oil and gas wells of all purposes in licensed areas of PJSC "LUKOIL", PJSC "NK "Rosneft", PJSC "Gazprom Neft", PJSC ANK "Bashneft", JSC NK "RussNeft", and other oil and gas companies.

The production capacities of BKE are concentrated in the West Siberia, Volga-Ural, and Timan-Pechora regions.

== History ==
Until December 2004, the company was part of LUKOIL and was called "Lukoil Drilling". Burovaya Kompaniya Eurasia was formed after acquisition of onshore drilling business of LUKOIL by Eurasia Drilling Company Limited for $130 million. In 2006, Burovaya Kompaniya Eurasia entered into offshore drilling business as well acquiring the offshore drilling business of LUKOIL.

From 2005 to 2020 inclusive, BKE drilled through 60,325,215 meters of subsurface (19,591 wells).

In May 2022, Eurasia Drilling Company sold Burovaya Kompaniya Eurasia to the Razvitie Drilling Company LLC.

== Activities ==
- Construction of exploratory, appraisal, and production wells
- Drilling of horizontal, directional and shallow wells
- Drilling of multilateral and branched-horizontal wells
- Drilling of oil wells under equilibrium and depression
- Development and testing of production and appraisal wells
- Drilling of sidetracks from previously drilled and cased wells
- Routine and major repair of oil and gas wells, downhole well repair
- Well abandonment and preservation Implementation of new technologies and engineering support of well drilling
- Performing the function of an integrator when performing work under integrated contract
