= List of gliders (M) =

This is a list of gliders/sailplanes of the world, (this reference lists all gliders with references, where available) Note: Any aircraft can glide for a short time, but gliders are designed to glide for longer.

== M ==
=== M&D ===
(M&D Flugzeugbau, Germany)

- M&D Flugzeugbau JS-MD Single
- M&D Flugzeugbau Samburo

=== Macetti ===
(A.M. Macetti)

- Macetti Aeronautilo

=== MacPherson ===
(Gregg MacPherson)

- MacPherson SG-1

=== MacPherson ===
(Gregg MacPherson)

- MacPherson SG-1 Sailplane

=== Maeda ===
(Keniti Maeda)

- Maeda 2 – (前田式2型(光2・1型))
- Maeda 5 – (前田健一 5)
- Maeda 6
- Maeda 7
- Maeda 105 – (前田式105型)
- Maeda 205 – (前田式205型)
- Maeda 703
- Maeda 2600
- Maeda Asahi – (朝日式駒鳥型)
- Maeda-Rokko 1
- Maeda-Rokko 2
- Maeda Ku-1 – a.k.a. Ku-1 Catamaran
- Maeda Ku-6 (Sora-sha – air vehicle, later Kuro-sha – black vehicle)
- Maeda Primary
- Maeda Army Type 2 Small Glider

=== Maggi ===
- Maggi MG-3 15L Condor

=== Magnan ===
(Dr. A. Magnan)

- Magnan Albatros
- Magnan M-2 Marin
- Magnan Vautour

=== Magnard ===
(Vizille Magnard, Isère)

- Magnard glider

=== MAI ===
(Moscow Aviation Institute)

- MAI-03
- MAI-53
- MAI-56
- MAI-60 Snezhinka
- MAI-63
- MAI-68
- MAI-890
- MAI-920
- Oskbes Aviatika Mai 920 – Oskbes MAI Moskau Aviation Institut

=== Mainelis ===
(P. Mainelis)

- Mainelis Birzietis (based on (Gö-3 Minimoa)

=== Malinowski ===
(Stefan Malinowski)

- Malinowski Dziaba – First Polish Glider Contest August 1923

=== Maluquer-Gimeno ===
(Juan J. Maluquer, Wahl & Gimeno)

- Maluquer-Gimeno MG-5 Industrial Engineer
- Maluquer Lenguado

=== Manicatide ===
(Radu Manicatide)

- Manicatide RM-10

=== Mantelli ===
(Adriano Mantelli)

- Mantelli AM-1 Me ne frego
- Mantelli AM-6
- Mantelli AM-11 Albatros
- Mantelli AM-12 Argentina
- Mantelli AM-12 Palas
- Mantelli AM-12 Praga
- Mantelli-Fossa MF-1
- Mantelli Parma

=== Manotskov ===
(A. Manotskov)

- Manotskov Kachouk (Маноцкова Кашук) (variable dihedral)

=== Manuel ===
(William L. Manuel)

- Manuel 1926 Biplane
- Manuel 1929 Biplane
- Manuel VI Primary
- Manuel Crested Wren
- Manuel Willow Wren
- Dunstable Kestrel
- Manuel Hawk
- Manuel Condor
- Manuel Gnat

=== Marais ===
(Charles Marais)

- Marais Avionette

=== Marcho-Silesia ===
(T.H. Marcho-Silesia / Akad. Fliegerschaft Marcho-Silesia)

- Marcho-Silesia Oberschlesien
- Marcho-Silesia Seppl

=== Marianów ===
(Wladyslaw Gallara / O.O.Marianów Secondary Convent School)

- Marianów W.1
- Marianów W.W.1

=== Marinavia Farina ===
(Domenico Farina / Marinavia Farina SRL)

- Marinavia Farina 15
- Marinavia Farina IV

=== Markmann ===
- Markmann Mark-10 (Horten H.Xa/b/c modern materials)

=== Marsch ===
(J. C. Marsch)

- Marsch Seaplane

=== Marsden ===
- (David Marsden)
- Marsden Gemini

=== Marske Aircraft ===
(Jim Marske, Marion Ohio, United States)

- Marske XM-1
- Marske Monarch
- Marske Pioneer I
- Marske Pioneer II
- Marske Pioneer III
- Genesis 1 (glider) Jim Marske & John Roncz
- Genesis 2 (motor-glider) Jim Marske & John Roncz

=== Martens ===
(A. Martens)

- Martens S
- Martens Pegasus

=== Martin ===
(William H. Martin)

- Martin 1908 glider

=== Masak ===
(Peter Masak)

- Masak Scimitar

=== Massia-Biot ===
(E.D. Massia & Gaston Biot)

- Massia-Biot 1882 glider

=== Massy ===
(Max Massy)

- Massy 1922 glider

=== Matejcek ===
(Jiri Matejcek / students of the Central Aeronautical Institute, Brno-Medlanky)

- Matejcek M-17 Universal

=== Matteson ===
(Fred H. Matteson)

- Matteson M-1

=== Maupin ===
(Jim Maupin)

- Maupin Woodstock One
- Maupin Carbon Dragon
- Maupin Windrose

=== Maxey-Prue ===
(Irwin Rue, Lyle Maxey – built by Franck Kearns)

- Maxey-Prue Jennie-Mae

=== Mayer ===
(Hermann Mayer)

- Mayer M-I
- Mayer MS-II

=== Mayer ===
(Oldřich Mayer / Oskar Mayer / Státní průmyslová škola, Moravská Ostrava-Vítkovice / Letov)

- MOV Káně
- Mayerovi Chachar
- Mayer MO-9

=== McAllister ===
(Charles McAllister)

- McAllister Yakima Clipper

=== McDaniel ===
(Taylor McDaniel)

- McDaniel 1931 Rubber Glider #1
- McDaniel 1931 Rubber Glider #2

=== McQuilkin ===
(Robert J. McQuilkin)

- McQuilkin Mach 1

=== MDM ===
(Zaklady Lotnicze Marganski & Myslowski Spolka z o.o. – Margański & Mysłowski Aviation Works) (MDM – Marganski, Dunowska, Makula)

- Margański & Mysłowski MDM-1 Fox
- Swift S-1

=== Mead ===
(T.E. Mead)

- Mead Challenger
- Mead Rhön Ranger

=== Mehr ===
(Franz Xaver Mehr)

- Mehr Me-1
- Mehr Me-2
- Mehr Me-3
- Mehr Me-4
- Mehr Me-4a
- Mehr Me-5
- Mehr Me-5a
- Mehr Me-6
- Mehr Me-6a

=== Meier ===
(Michel-Lorenz Meier Hamburger Aero Club)

- Meier Mei-11
- Meier Milomei M-1
- Meier Milomei M-2

=== Meindl ===
(Ob.-Ing. Erich Meindl / Burgfalke Flugzeugbau)

- Meindl M-2 Linz

=== Melsheimer ===
(Frank Melsheimer)

- Melsheimer FM-1

=== Merriam ===
(Capt F. W. Merriam)

- Merriam 1922 glider

=== Merville ===
- Merville SM.20
- Merville SM.30
- Merville SM.31

=== Messerschmitt ===
(Wilhelm Emil Messerschmitt / Messerschmitt AG / Bayerische Flugzeugwerke (BFW))

- Messerschmitt Me 163 Komet
- Messerschmitt Me 321 Gigant
- Messerschmitt S-13
- Messerschmitt S-14
- Messerschmitt S-15
- Messerschmitt S-16
- Messerschmitt S-16B

=== Meteor ===
(Meteor C.A., Monfalcone)

- Meteor MS-30 L-Passero

=== Meusel ===
- Horst Meusel / Verein für Luftfahrt e.V., Zittau)
- Meusel M-IV

=== Micika ===
(Milose Micika)

- MiMi B-3 Šídlo

=== Midland Gliding Club ===
- Midland Sailplane

=== Midwest Sailplane ===
- Midwest MU-1

=== Miecyslaw Siegel ===
- Miecyslaw Siegel MS 1
- Miecyslaw Siegel MS 2
- Miecyslaw Siegel MS 3
- Miecyslaw Siegel MS 8

=== Mignet ===
(Henri Mignet)

- Mignet HM-1-1
- Mignet HM-1-2
- Mignet HM-5 Planeur brouette

=== Mikhaïlovgrad ===
- Mikhaïlovgrad Perles – Михайловград Бисер
- Mikhaïlovgrad Moto-Perles – Михайловград Мото-Бисер

=== Milbert ===
(Milbert / Hamburger Flugzeugbau (?))

- Milbert Hansa

=== Miles ===
(F.G. Miles Ltd.)

- Miles M.76 Durestos Glider Wing

=== Militi ===
- Militi M.B.1
- Militi M.B.2 Leonardo

=== Miliunas ===
(Miliunas & Oshkinis / Miliunas & Kontrimas)

- Miliunas-Kontrimas Nida
- Miliunas Oskin MO-1
- Miliunas Oskin MO-2

=== Miller ===
(Terry Miller)

- Miller Tern

=== Mineo ===
(Michel Minéo)

- Minéo M-5 – Mineo, Michel
- Minéo M-6 – Mineo, Michel

=== MIP ===
(Gustaw Mokrzycki, Ludwig Moczarski, Jan Idzkowski & Jerzy Ploszajski / Warsaw Technical High School)

- MIP Smyk

=== Mišurec-Pučan ===
(Jindřich Mišurec & Norbert Pučan, Brno)

- Mišurec-Pučan MP-1
- Mišurec-Pučan MP-2

=== Mitchell ===
(Don Mitchell (aircraft designer))

- Mitchell Nimbus I
- Mitchell Nimbus II
- Mitchell Nimbus III
- Mitchell B-10
- Mitchell U-2 Super Wing
- Mitchell Victory Wing

=== MKEK ===
(Turkish: Makina ve Kimya Endüstrisi Kurumu - Mechanical and Chemical Industry Corporation)

- MKEK 6

=== MLL ===
( )

- MLL Tulák 37

=== Mlody Lotnik ===
(Mlody Lotnik - Antoni Uszacki)

- Mlody Lotnik glider

=== Molino O/Y ===
See PIK

=== Möller ===
(Flugzeugbau Möller / Ing. Hans Gunther Möller)

- Möller Stormarn

=== Monaghan ===
(Richard Monaghan)

- Monaghan Osprey

=== Monnett ===
(John T. Monnett)

- Monnett Monerai
- Monnett Monerai S
- Monnett Monerai P
- Monnett Monerai Max
- Monnett Moni

=== Montagne Noire ===
- Montagne Noire Pastel MN 600 K

=== Montgomery ===
(John Joseph Montgomery)

- Montgomery 1884 glider
- Montgomery 1885 glider
- Montgomery 1886 glider
- Montgomery 1905 The Santa Clara
- Montgomery 1905 The California
- Montgomery 1911 The Evergreen

=== Mooney ===
(Walt Mooney)

- Mooney Dust Devil

=== Moore-Gibson-Emslie ===
(L.P. Moore, J. Gibson & K. Emslie / The Birmingham Guild Ltd.)

- Moore Gypsy

=== Moore ===
(Arien C. Moore)

- Moore SS-1

=== Morelli ===
(Alberto & Piero Morelli / Aeromere / CVT / Avionautica Rio / CARMAM)

- Morelli M-100

=== Mori ===
(Angelo Mori, GVV Tommaso Dal Molin, Varese)

- Mori Anfibio Roma
- Mori Anfibio Varese

=== Moswey ===
(Moswey Segelflugzeug-Werke) – (Georg & Heinrich Müller)

- Moswey 1
- Moswey 2
- Moswey 2a
- Moswey 3
- Moswey 4
- Moswey 4a
- Moswey 6
- Moswey GM-1

=== Motiekaitis ===
(P. Motiekaitis - Lithuania)

- Motiekaitis Motion-1
- Motiekaitis Motion-2

=== Mouillard ===
- Mouillard M-3
- Mouillard M-4

=== Mroczkowski ===
(Antoni von Mroczkowski)

- Mroczkowski 1910 Glider

=== MRsZ ===
(MRSz - Magyar Repülési Szövetség Központi Műhelye)

- MRSz Bene
- MRSz Z-03 Ifjúság
- MRSz Z-04 Béke
- MRSz A-08 Sirály

=== Mudry ===
(Avions Mudry Cie, Port d'attache, Cannes Mandelieu)

- Mudry CAP-1

=== MSrE ===
(Műegyetemi Sportrepülő Egyesület – BME Sportrepülő Association)

- MSrE M-20 (Rubik R-01) – Ernõ RUBIK and Endre JANCSÓ – MSrE
- MSrE M-22 – András Szokolay & Endre Jancso – MSrE / Aero Ever Ltd., Aircraft Factory of Transylvania
- MSrE M-30 Fergeteg
- EMESE-B – Rubik and Jancsó
- EMESE-C – re-designed by Tasnádi

=== Müller ===
(K. Müller)

- Müller M-2

=== Muramaya ===
- Muramaya Asahi 1

=== Muraszew & Tomaszewski ===
- Muraszew & Tomaszewski M.T.1

=== Musachevo ===
(Musachevo glider workshop / L. Panov and D. Panchovsky, R. Radomirov, D. Panchovski & Vlychev )

- Kometa Standard
- Kometa-Standard II
- Kometa-Standard III

=== Musger ===
(Edwin Musger)

- Musger Mg 1 St. Pölten
- Musger Mg 2
- Musger Mg 4
- Musger Mg 9
- Musger Mg 10
- Musger Mg 12
- Musger Mg 12A
- Musger Mg 15
- Musger Mg 19 Steinadler
- Musger Mg 23
- Musger MG-II Uhu
- Musger Mg-IV Pechvogel
- Musger SG-12

=== Muszyński ===
(Zbigniew Muszynski)

- Muszyński ZM-1
- Muszyński ZM-3
