= Mantelli Parma =

Parma

General information
- Type: Single seat glider
- National origin: Italy
- Manufacturer: Emilio Pastorelle
- Designer: Adriano Mantelli
- Number built: 1

History
- First flight: 1947

The Mantelli Parma was a simple, light weight, single seat glider built in Italy and first flown in 1947. Only one was constructed.

== Development ==
The single example of the Parma glider, one of many glider designs from Adriano Mantelli, was built in 1947 in the workshops of Mantelli's Alaparma SpA by Emilio Pastorelli during his spare time. It was intended to be light, simple and cheap to build and easy to transport, whilst flying well in thermals. It had a cantilever high wing mounted on top of its fuselage and constructed in one piece to keep the weight very low. The wing had a single spar, with plywood skin forward around the leading edge forming a torsion-resistant D-box. In plan the wing was rectangular with rounded tips.

The Parma had an smoothly plywood skinned, oval cross-section fuselage, with its cockpit under the wing leading edge and enclosed by a single piece transparency. The fuselage tapered rearwards, where a straight edged, round tipped tailplane mounted on top of the fuselage carried elevators with a cut-out for rudder movement. The fin and rudder were rounded, the latter of broad chord and reaching down to the keel. The glider landed on a sprung skid reaching from the nose almost to the wing trailing edge, assisted by a small tail bumper.

Mantelli flew his glider on its first flight in 1947, aerotowed by the AM-9, a two-seat motor-glider and another of his designs. The Parma proved to be a useful trainer and could use weak thermals; it could also, despite its single piece wing, be transported behind a bicycle. To remove the wing for transport required the removal of just three bolts.

== Specifications ==
Data from Pedrielli (2011) p.217

General characteristics

- Capacity: One
- Length: 4.80 m (15 ft 9 in)
- Wingspan: 11.30 m (37 ft 1 in)
- Wing area: 11 m^{2} (120 sq ft)
- Aspect ratio: 11
- Empty weight: 65 kg (143 lb)
- Gross weight: 145 kg (320 lb)

Performance

- Maximum glide ratio: estimated 20:1
- Rate of sink: 0.80 m/s (157 ft/min) minimum
- Wing loading: 15 kg/m^{2} (3.1 lb/sq ft)
