= MRSz Bene =

Hungarian two seat primary glider

Bene

General information
- Type: Two seat bprimary glider.
- National origin: Hungary
- Manufacturer: Central Workshop of the Hungarian Aeronautical Association, Dunakeszi (MRSz - Magyar Repülési Szövetség Központi Műhelye)
- Designer: Hugó Nagy
- Number built: 1

History
- First flight: August 1952

The MSRz Bene was a Hungarian two seat primary glider, first flown in 1952. By this time its competitor had been awarded a serial production order, so only one working Bene was ever completed.

== Design and development ==
In 1948 the Hungarian National Flying Association (OMRE), which in 1951 became the Hungarian Aeronautical Association (MRSz), invited tenders for a two seat primary glider; the runner-up was a design from Hugó Nagy and Tibor Bánsági. In 1950 they submitted a revised version, named Bene after Lajos Benicky the designer of the MSrE M-30 Fergeteg.

The Bene had an all-wood, two part high wing, ball-jointed together on a short pedestal above the fuselage. In plan there was a rectangular inner section, occupying about a third of the span, and trapezoidal, round-tipped outer panels with most of the taper on the trailing edge. Each half-wing were built around a straight main spar at about 33% chord and an auxiliary spar at 70% chord. All wing surfaces were plywood covered. The wings were braced with a single strut on each side, joining the lower fuselage to the main spar towards the end of the inner panel. The inner panels carried inboard landing flaps and beyond them, Göppingen-type spoilers, mounted just ahead of the spar, which opened above and below the wings. Its split, differential, Frise-balanced ailerons filled all of the trailing edges of the outer panels. Unusually, another set of spoilers, mounted near the wingtips just aft of the auxiliary spar and opening only upwards, assisted turns.

The fuselage was of mixed construction. The forward section, from the rear of the wing to the nose and including the pedestal, was built around a square cross-section, welded steel-tube girder with transverse frames shaping the curved fabric surface. Aft, it was a wooden structure. The pupil sat ahead of the wing, with the instructor under it at about 25% chord. His seat was higher than that of the pupil so he could see the single set of instruments and placed his head in a small gap between the half-wings forward of the main spar, giving him some upward vision as the one-piece canopy stretched back above the wing to the spar. The Bene did not land on a conventional glider landing skid but instead had a small nosewheel, a larger main wheel at the c.g. under the trailing edge and a small tailskid. Winch launches were made with a Y-ended cable that engaged a hook on each side of the nose.

The Bene's unswept, round-tipped tailplane was mounted on top of the fuselage and braced from below with a strut on each side. Its elevators were strongly tapered and cut away centrally for rudder movement. The fin was also unswept and round-tipped, carrying a broad, rounded rudder which reached down to the keel.

After its maiden flight in mid 1952 the Bene received only limited testing, as the competing MRSz Z-03 Ifjúság had already received an order for serial production. The sole example was scrapped in 1954.

== Specifications ==
Data from Gabor, F

General characteristics

- Crew: Pupil and instructor in tandem
- Length: 7.45 m (24 ft 5 in)
- Wingspan: 17 m (55 ft 9 in)
- Wing area: 21.1 m^{2} (227 sq ft)
- Aspect ratio: 13.7
- Airfoil: Göttingen Gö 549 out to Gö 676 tips
- Empty weight: 244 kg (538 lb)
- Gross weight: 420 kg (926 lb)
- Dihedral: 3°

Performance

- Maximum speed: 220 km/h (140 mph, 120 kn) never exceed
- Maximum glide ratio: 20.5 at 720 km/h (450 mph; 390 kn)
- Rate of sink: 0.95 m/s (187 ft/min) minimum, at 65 km/h (40 mph; 35 kn)
- Maximum speed in rough air: 120 km/h (75 mph; 65 kn)
