= M22 =

M22, M.22 or M-22 may refer to:

== Transportation ==
=== Aviation ===
- BFW M.22, prototype, 1928 German bomber
- Jancsó-Szokolay M22, 1937 Hungarian sailplane
- Magni M-22 Voyager, autogyro
- Mooney M22 Mustang, 1964 American light aircraft
- Shvetsov M-22, a Soviet version of the Bristol Jupiter aircraft engine
- Russellville Municipal Airport (FAA LID: M22)

=== Road transport ===
- M22 (New York City bus), a New York City Bus route in Manhattan
- Highway M22 (Ukraine)
- M-22 (Michigan highway), a state highway in Michigan
- M22 (Cape Town), a Metropolitan Route in Cape Town, South Africa
- M22 (Johannesburg), a Metropolitan Route in Johannesburg, South Africa
- M22 (Pretoria), a Metropolitan Route in Pretoria, South Africa
- M22 (Durban), a Metropolitan Route in Durban, South Africa
- M22 road (Malawi)
- M22 motorway (Northern Ireland)

== Military ==
- HMS M22, Royal Navy M15 class monitor; later HMS Media
- M22 Locust, a light tank of World War II
- M-22 Uragan/Shtil (SA-N-7, Gadfly), Soviet naval multirole SAM system
- M22, the US Army designation for a type of 7x50 binoculars produced by Steiner-Optik

== Other ==
- M 22, a political movement of the 1970s and 1980s in Congo-Brazzaville
- M22, a vitrification agent or cryoprotectant, used in cryonics and cryopreservation
- The Mathieu group M_{22} in the mathematical field of group theory
- M_{22} graph, in graph theory
- Messier 22, a globular cluster in the constellation Sagittarius
- Mälar 22, sailboat class
- M-22 (duo), a British-German DJ and producer duo consisting of Matt James and Frank Sanders.
- M22, an ISO metric screw thread size
- McLaren M22, a Formula 5000 racing car
- Samsung Galaxy M22, an Android-based smartphone by Samsung
