= Genesis 2 =

Genesis 2 or Genesis II may refer to:

- Genesis II (space habitat), an experimental spacecraft launched by Bigelow Aerospace in 2006
- Genesis II (film), a 1973 television film pilot
- Genesis II Church of Health and Healing, promoter of MMS (known as the "Miracle Mineral Solution") and other sacraments
- Genesis 2 (Bible), chapter 2 of the Book of Genesis
- LAK Genesis 2, a Standard Class competition glider designed by Jerry Mercer and produced in Lithuania.
- GENESIS 2, video game tournament held in 2011
- Mega Drive 2, the second major hardware version of Sega's Mega Drive video game system (known as Genesis in North America)
