= Genesis 1 (disambiguation) =

Genesis 1 typically refers to the first chapter of the Biblical book of Genesis.

It may also refer to:

- Genesis I, an experimental spacecraft launched by Bigelow Aerospace in 2006
- LAK Genesis — a tailless glider developed by Jim Marske and John Roncz in the United States.
