= List of Bulgarian gliders =

This is a list of gliders/sailplanes of the world, (this reference lists all gliders with references, where available) Note: Any aircraft can glide for a short time, but gliders are designed to glide for longer.

== Bulgarian miscellaneous constructors ==
- Bisser – Bulgaria
- DAR Zdravka Vekilski – 1926 parasol single-seat glider, Hermann Vinter, 1 built – named after Lt Vekilski, Bulgarian national hero
- DAR Rilski Orel – 1935 single-seat parasol training glider, span 15.82m – 3 built, 'Albatross', 'Chuchuliga' ('Lark') and 'Rilski Orel' ('Rilksi Eagle') – Rilski Orel won 1936 Olympic gold medal for flight qualities.
- DAR Zdravka Toprakchiev – 1926 parasol single-seat glider, Hermann Winter, 1 built – named after Mjr Toprakchiev, Bulgarian national hero
- Kometa Standard – L. Panov and D. Panchovsky
- Kometa-Standard II – L. Panov and D. Panchovsky
- Kometa-Standard III – L. Panov and D. Panchovsky
- Lazarov Drang (Лазаров Дрангов) – Lazarov, Tzvetan – Bulgaria
- Polkovnik Drangov – Lazarov, Zvetan – Bulgaria
- Jerav (glider) – Bulgaria (Kranich II copy)
- VSR Musachevo Jastreb
