= Marske Aircraft =

American aircraft design firm

Marske Aircraft Corporation
- Company type: Privately held company
- Industry: Aerospace
- Founded: 29 October 1973
- Founder: Jim Marske
- Defunct: 14 October 2005
- Headquarters: Marion, Ohio, United States
- Products: Gliders
- Owner: Jim Marske
- Website: www.marskeaircraft.com

Marske Aircraft Corporation was an American aircraft design firm founded by Jim Marske (born 1938) and based in Marion, Ohio. The company specialized in the design of tailless gliders primarily for amateur construction.

Marske's first design was the Marske XM-1, constructed in 1957 when he was 19 years old. The design was an experiment and only one was constructed. The Marske Pioneer series first flew in 1968 and has been developed through the all-composite construction Pioneer III model. The Marske Monarch is a tailless ultralight glider that was first flown in 1974, during the early heyday of hang glider flying. The Monarch can be built as a powered self-launching sailplane or as a pure glider, depending on whether an engine is installed.

Marske also collaborated with US aerodynamicist John Roncz in 1992 on the design of the LAK Genesis 2 that was produced for a time in Lithuania, 27 having been completed. The Genesis was the first production aircraft to use Graphlite carbon rods for the spars.

== Aircraft ==
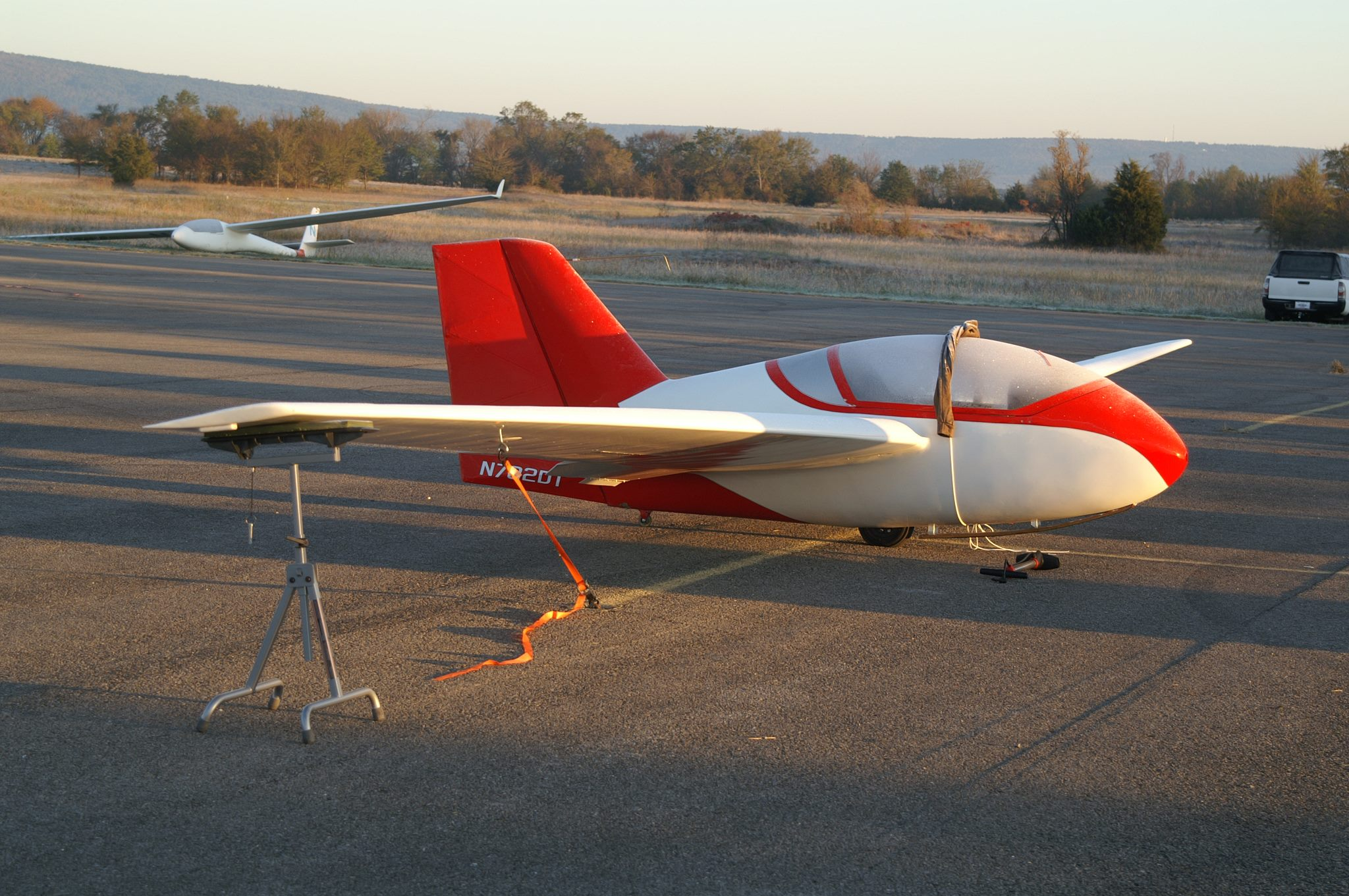
Marske Pioneer.

Summary of aircraft built by Marske Aircraft
Model name	First flight	Number built	Type
Marske XM-1	1957	1	tailless glider
Marske Pioneer	1968	at least 17	tailless glider
Marske Monarch	1974		tailless ultralight glider
