= Alaparma Baldo =

Baldo
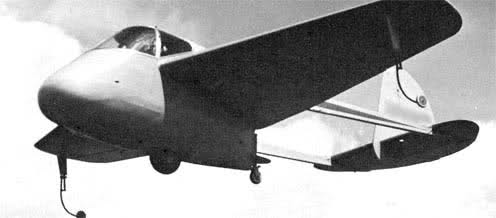

General information
- Type: Civil utility aircraft
- Manufacturer: Alaparma
- Designer: Adriano Mantelli
- Number built: ~35

History
- Manufactured: 1949-51

The Alaparma Baldo was an unusual two-seat light monoplane produced in Italy shortly after World War II. Designed by Adriano Mantelli, it featured an egg-shaped fuselage with cabin doors that hinged upwards and to the back. The conventional tailplane with single fin and rudder was carried on twin booms, either side of a pusher engine installation. The undercarriage consisted of a single mainwheel under the fuselage pod, a small tailwheel not far behind it, and outrigger wheels on the wingtips.

== Variants ==
- AM.65 with 65hp Walter Mikron piston engine
- AM.75 with 75hp Praga D engine

== Operators ==
Italy

- Italian Air Force operated 10 aircraft until 1951

== Specifications (AM.75) ==
Alaparma Baldo

Data from Jane's All The World's Aircraft 1951–52

General characteristics

- Crew: 2
- Length: 5.08 m (16 ft 8 in)
- Wingspan: 7.00 m (23 ft 0 in)
- Height: 1.45 m (4 ft 9 in)
- Wing area: 8.5 m^{2} (91 sq ft)
- Empty weight: 280 kg (617 lb)
- Gross weight: 490 kg (1,080 lb)
- Powerplant: 1 × Praga D 4-cylinder horizontally-opposed piston engine, 56 kW (75 hp)

Performance

- Maximum speed: 217 km/h (135 mph, 117 kn)
- Cruise speed: 192 km/h (119 mph, 104 kn) (75% power)
- Range: 660 km (410 mi, 360 nmi)
- Service ceiling: 4,800 m (15,700 ft)
- Time to altitude: 5 min to 1,000 m (3,300 ft)
