= Oberlerchner Mg 19 =

Two seat tandem trainer glider built in Austria

Mg 19 Steinadler
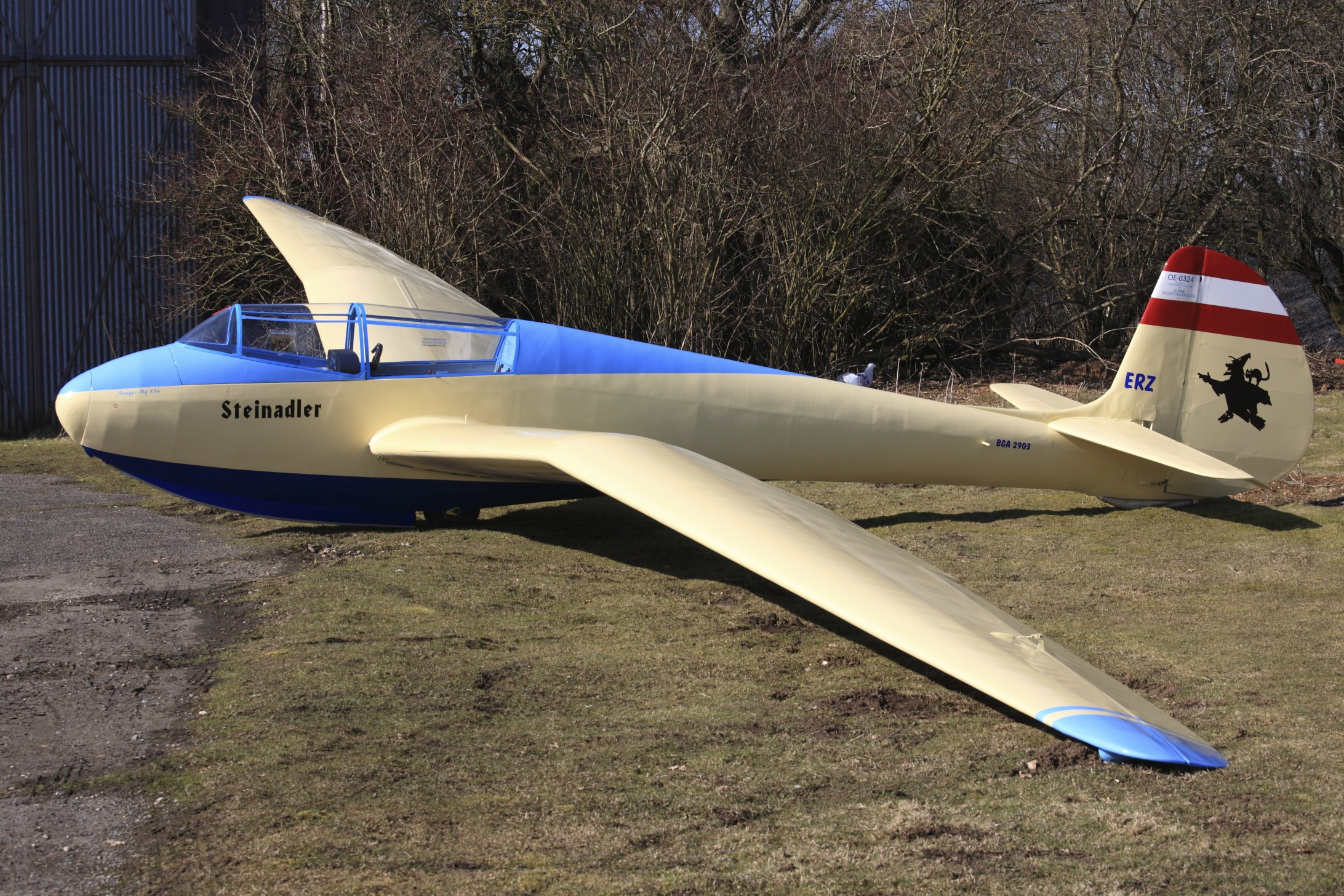
- Oberlerchner Mg19a

General information
- Type: Two seat tandem trainer glider
- National origin: Austria
- Manufacturer: Oberlerchner
- Designer: Erwin Musger
- Number built: 46, not including the Mg 19s

History
- First flight: November 1951
- Developed from: Musger Mg 9

The Oberlerchner Mg 19 Steinadler (English: Golden Eagle) is an Erwin Musger designed two seat tandem trainer glider built in Austria and first flown in 1951. Several examples of this successful aircraft, which competed in the two seat class at two World Gliding Championships in the 1950s, were still flying in 2000.

== Design and development ==
In the 1930s Erwin Musger was a prominent Austrian glider producer. His first two-seat design was the gull wing Musger Mg 9, which set a world duration record in 1938. The Oberlerchner Mg 19 was a post-World War II development of the Mg 9, financed by the Austrian industrialist Joseph Oberlerchner, with a mid/low rather than high wing. The change of wing position was principally made to enhance the upwards view from the rear seat, which on the Mg 9 was blocked by the wing. The wing roots are carefully faired into the fuselage to avoid airflow turbulence and the 10° of dihedral on the inner third of the span takes the wing tips well clear of the ground, even though the outer panels had only 2° dihedral.

Like the rest of the Steinadler, the two part cantilever wings is wood framed and covered in a mixture of plywood and fabric. Each part is built around a single spar, with ply covering ahead of it around the leading edge forming a D-shaped torsion box. Behind the spar the wing is fabric covered, except for small areas near the root and near the tip, where the aileron hinge angles in towards the spar, that require strengthening. On the earliest model, the Mg 19, the ailerons fill the trailing edge from bend to tip but such a large area produces heavy control loads and on the Mg 19a the ailerons are reduced in length by about a third. Schempp-Hirth airbrakes open above and below the wing just inboard of the bend at 44% chord. In plan the wing has a straight and swept leading edge. The trailing edge is also straight inboard of the ailerons, where the tips become semi-elliptical. A 1° sweep at one quarter chord produces a swept spar to allow the two ends to meet just behind the rear seat.

On the later models the gull wing is replaced by one with a constant 5° dihedral without altering the tip ground clearance, though the clearance with extended airbrakes is small. Otherwise the wing of the Mg 19b is unchanged. The wing of the World Gliding Championships contending Mg 19c is different, with straight tapered outer panels, small tip bodies and a section which is a blend of the laminar flow NACA 64-2015 airfoil and the older, proven Göttingen 549.

The Steinadler's fuselage has oval frames and slender longerons skinned with ply. Moving forward, it becomes deeper from behind the wing trailing edge and under the cockpit, where the two occupants sit in tandem. The rear seat is a little higher than that of the pilot for better forward vision and both are enclosed by a framed canopy divided into two parts, each of which is starboard hinged. A skid runs along the fuselage underside from nose to under mid-wing but the main undercarriage is a fixed, semi-recessed, monowheel, fitted with a brake, assisted by a sprung tailskid. The fuselage of the Mg 19a and later Steinadlers is some 300 mm (11.8 in) longer than that of the Mg 19. The whole horizontal tail and the rudder are fabric covered, the former straight tapered and round tipped, mounted on top of the fuselage ahead of the fin. The trailing edges of the elevators are ahead of the rudder hinge, with a port side trim tab. On the Mg 19b and c there is a low fillet ahead of the fin, not present on the earlier models. The fin is narrow, with a swept leading edge and the unbalanced rudder is D-shaped and broad.

The Mg 19 made its first flight in November 1951. Including all models, 47 were built. All but one were built by Joseph Oberlerchner's Spittal factory. The exception is the Mg 19s, built by students in Graz, which had a long development time from 1956 to its first flight in 1960. With a steel framed fuselage and new wing it was quite different from the other Steinadlers and, in the view of one author, "not really a Mg 19 at all."

== Operational history ==
The Steinadler was used by many Austrian clubs and by 1963 had set most of the national two seat records. Several remained in service fifty years after the first flight and eleven remained on the Austrian civil register in 2009.

The sole Mg 19c took part in the World Gliding Championships of 1956, held at Saint-Yan, the last WGC to have a separate category for two seaters, but did not finish in the top six.

== Variants ==
Data from Sailplanes 1945-1965

Mg 19
Original gull wing version. First flown November 1951. 12 built.
Mg 19a
Gull wing, with ailerons lightened by shortening and with a 300 mm (11.8 in) longer fuselage. First flown 20 March 1955. 21 built.
Mg 19b
Constant dihedral wing. First flown 15 June 1954. 12 built.
Mg 19c
Revised wing plan with slightly greater span and new section. Competed in the 1956 WGC. 1 built.
Mg 19s
Very different glider with steel tube fuselage frame and new wings. Developed in Graz 1956–60. 1 only.

== Aircraft on display ==
In 2008 ten Steinadlers were preserved in European museums, though only four were on general public display. These are at

- Aviaticum near Wiener Neustadt, Austria:

Mg 19 OE-0197

- Austrian Aircraft Museum, Feldkirchen bei Graz, Austria:

Mg 19a OE-0604
Mg 19c OE-0344.

- Gliding Heritage Centre, Lasham Airfield, Great Britain:

Mg 19a OE-0324

== Specifications (Mg 19a) ==
Data from Jane's World Sailplanes and Motor Gliders (1980)

General characteristics

- Crew: Two
- Length: 8.04 m (26 ft 5 in)
- Wingspan: 17.6 m (57 ft 9 in) 1.65
- Wing area: 21.0 m^{2} (226 sq ft)
- Aspect ratio: 14.2
- Airfoil: Göttingen 549 inboard, 676 at tip
- Empty weight: 298 kg (657 lb)
- Max takeoff weight: 480 kg (1,058 lb)

Performance

- Maximum speed: 180 km/h (110 mph, 97 kn)
- Stall speed: 50 km/h (31 mph, 27 kn)
- Maximum glide ratio: best, 27.8:1 at 67 km/h (42 mph; 36 kn)
- Rate of sink: 0.65 m/s (128 ft/min) minimum, at 62 km/h (39 mph; 33 kn)
- Wing loading: 22.9 kg/m^{2} (4.7 lb/sq ft)

== See also ==
Related lists

- List of gliders
