= MRSz Z-04 Béke =

Aerobatic glider

Z-04 Béke
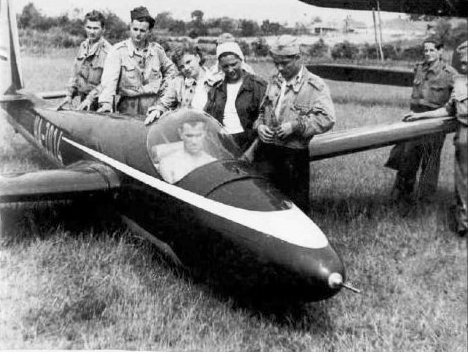

General information
- Type: Aerobatic glider
- National origin: Hungary
- Manufacturer: Central Workshop of the Hungarian Aeronautical Association (MRSz - Magyar Repülési Szövetség Központi Műhelye), Dunakeszi.
- Designer: Ferenc Zsebő (team leader)
- Number built: 1

History
- First flight: June 1955

The MRSz Z-04 Béke (Peace) was a Hungarian aerobatic glider. First flown in 1955, it became a familiar display aircraft, though only one was built.

== Design and development ==

The Letov LF-107 Luňák was the dominant Hungarian aerobatic glider from the late 1940s but it was being phased out by 1954 and MÖHOSZ, the organization which controlled sports flying, ordered a replacement design from MRSz, the Central Workshop of the Hungarian Aeronautical Association at Dunakeszi. The design team was headed by Ferenc Zsebő and the single seat MRSz Z-04 Béke was first flown in June 1954.

Its cantilever, wooden, two part, mid-set wing was trapezoidal in plan with most of the sweep on the trailing edge. Built around a single spar, aided by a short, angled inboard, internal drag strut, each half-wing was entirely plywood covered. There were no flaps, but Göppingen-type spoilers, placed immediately behind the spars at 38% chord and one-third span, opened both above and below the wing. Immediately outboard of the spoilers split, mass-balanced, differential, fabric-covered ailerons filled the rest of the trailing edges. Unusually, the inner ailerons deflected more than the outer to more equally distribute the loads.

The Béke's fuselage was a light-alloy monocoque with an elliptical cross-section, formed with light alloy frames and longerons and skinned with 800 μm thick duralumin sheet. The spars of the half-wings were connected to the fuselage by two pairs of ball and socket joints at either end of a box beam which ran across the fuselage. The cockpit placed the pilot just ahead of the wing leading edge and had a one-piece canopy. The fuselage was strengthened in this region by reinforced longerons and a double keel which also took landing gear loads from a fixed, semi-recessed monowheel, placed under the leading edge with skid ahead of it to the nose. Its rear fuselage and empennage, though an integral continuation of the forward part, was very similar to that of Zsebő's earlier MRSz Z-03 Ifjúság's rear part-fuselage. The tail unit had light-alloy structure and all fixed surfaces were light-alloy skinned. The control surfaces were fabric-covered. The Béke's horizontal tail was trapezoidal in plan as was the fin, though it had a very low forward extension on which the tailplane was mounted. The profile of the broad, unbalanced rudder was also angular and extended down to the keel, where the rudder swept up noticeably rearwards.

== Operational history ==
Only one Béke was built. It first flew in June 1955 and became a popular sight at airshows in Hungary and abroad in the late 1950s, appearing at Vienna in 1956 and Tushino, Moscow in 1958.

== Specifications ==
Data from Gabor, F

General characteristics

- Crew: One
- Length: 6.7 m (22 ft 0 in)
- Wingspan: 14 m (45 ft 11 in)
- Wing area: 13.7 m^{2} (147 sq ft)
- Aspect ratio: 14.3
- Airfoil: NACA 23 015 at root, slowly modified to NACA 23 012 at tip.
- Empty weight: 280 kg (617 lb)
- Gross weight: 370 kg (816 lb)
- Dihedral: 3°

Performance

- Maximum speed: 400 km/h (250 mph, 220 kn) never exceed
- Stall speed: 70 km/h (43 mph, 38 kn)
- Maximum glide ratio: 23 at 90 km/h (56 mph; 49 kn)
- Rate of sink: 1.0 m/s (200 ft/min) minimum, at 83 km/h (52 mph; 45 kn)
