= Alaparma =

Italian aircraft manufacturer

- Industry: Aircraft manufacture
- Founded: 1945 at Parma, Italy
- Founder: Adriano Mantelli and Livio Agostini
- Fate: defunct
- Headquarters: Parma, Italy
- Products: Ultralight aircraft

Alaparma was an Italian aircraft manufacturer of the immediate post-World War II period. It was founded in 1945 by designer Capt Adriano Mantelli and Livio Agostini to produce an unusual light aircraft developed by Mantelli during the war, initially as the Tucano and later as the Baldo.

== See also ==
- List of Italian companies
