= Haig Minibat =

American glider

Minibat
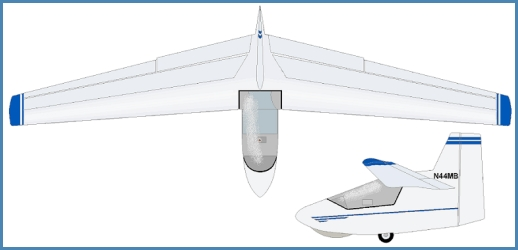

General information
- Type: Motor glider
- National origin: United States
- Manufacturer: Larry Haig
- Designer: Larry Haig
- Status: No longer in production
- Number built: 55 sets of plans sold, at least ten completed

History
- First flight: 1979

The Haig Minibat is a high-wing, single-seat tailless motor glider that was designed by Larry Haig, and first flown in 1979. At one time available as plans or in kit form for amateur construction. The kit is no longer available.

== Design and development ==
The Minibat was designed by Haig as a motor glider, but without self-launching capabilities, instead the aircraft is launched by aerotow, winch launching or auto-tow. The small chainsaw engine provides enough power to ensure a positive rate of climb and prevent land-outs, but not enough power for launching. The design goal was a glider with slightly greater performance than the Schweizer 1-26.

The Minibat is constructed predominantly from foam and fiberglass and features a monowheel landing gear. The engine is mounted in the rear fuselage in pusher configuration, with the propeller mounted unconventionally between the fuselage and the rudder. Wingtip extensions are available which increase the wingspan to 32.7 ft (10.0 m) and raise the aircraft's glide ratio from 23:1 with the standard 25 ft (7.6 m) wings to 30:1.

== Operational history ==
In March 2011 there were ten Minibats registered with the Federal Aviation Administration in the USA.

== Specifications (Minibat with wingtip extensions) ==
Data from Soaring

General characteristics

- Crew: one
- Wingspan: 32 ft 8 in (9.96 m)
- Wing area: 76.5 sq ft (7.11 m^{2})
- Aspect ratio: 14:1
- Empty weight: 130 lb (59 kg)
- Gross weight: 350 lb (159 kg)
- Powerplant: 1 × chain saw engine single cylinder

Performance

- Maximum glide ratio: 30:1
- Rate of sink: 180 ft/min (0.91 m/s)

== See also ==
- List of gliders

Aircraft of comparable role, configuration, and era

- Marske Monarch
