= John Roncz =

American aerodynamicist

- Born: May 25, 1948; Lakeville, Indiana, US
- Died: September 27, 2023 (aged 75); Lakeville, Indiana
- Occupations: Aeronautical engineer, aerodynamicist
- Known for: Airfoil design
- Notable work: Rutan Voyager, GlobalFlyer
- Parents: P. John Roncz (father); Catherine Roncz (mother)
- Relatives: Sisters: Diane, Janet, Maribeth

John Gregory Roncz (May 25, 1948 – September 27, 2023) was an American aerodynamicist involved in the development of over 50 different aircraft, ranging from ultralights, round-the world record breakers and military transports, to yachts and a racing car. He was described by Burt Rutan, the prolific aircraft creator, as "the genius of airfoil design".

His most famous projects are the Rutan Voyager and the Virgin Atlantic GlobalFlyer, which both flew around the world, non-stop and unrefuelled, and are now displayed at the Smithsonian National Air and Space Museum's buildings in Washington, D.C. and Chantilly, Virginia.

== Early life ==
John Roncz was born to Peter John Roncz and his wife Catherine, née Scheibelhut, of South Bend, Indiana, who were married in June 1946. Known as P. John Roncz, his father was a co-founder of Maron Products Inc, an engineering company specializing in metal stampings, mainly for the automotive industry.

The young Roncz was a prodigy, becoming a concert violinist at the age of five, playing with a local symphony orchestra. At the age of 10, after 6 months practice, he moved to the piano, winning a state prize, and had composed a march for his class, and entered national and international piano competitions.

He attended a special school for gifted people at his local university, Notre Dame in South Bend, where he displayed a talent for languages, becoming fluent in eight modern and ancient languages, including French and Hebrew. As a student at Notre Dame, he studied particle physics and Egyptian hieroglyphics while working toward his honors degree in government and international affairs. At no time in his life did he take any engineering course.

After university in 1971 Roncz had no immediate career prospects, so started working as a carpenter for local automotive-related companies before starting to sell his own paintings through local galleries and via the occasional commission. After nine months of this, he began working for his father's company, engineering special metal parts and discovering, unsurprisingly, that he had a talent for it. In November 1977 he set up his own company, called Gemini Technologies Inc, designing and making better and cheaper parts than the competition. He did not charge for designing the parts, but, by not revealing to his clients the specification of the metal he used, they were compelled to buy it from him.

The success of this business involved Roncz in a lot of travelling, particularly to Detroit, so he decided that he would prefer to fly than to drive. He had always had an interest in aviation (his father had been a bombardier during WW2) and had built model aircraft as a child. Now he learned to fly in a Cessna 150, gaining his licence in 1975. He then bought a used Rockwell 112 and gained his commercial and instrument ratings in that before earning his multi-engine rating in a Cessna 310. He then did some cargo flying for a local company by night, while still doing his day job.

== Aerodynamics ==
Roncz became interested in aerodynamics theory, and having read some books on the subject, became fascinated by the mathematics behind the theories. He was of course extremely good at mathematics, and began testing the numbers using his calculator. This was extremely tedious work for the multiple calculations he wanted to perform, and he lost interest in pursuing it. He did however continue to devour every aerodynamics theory book and paper he could find and soon realized that the newly invented home computers could relieve him of the tedium of multiple calculations, so he built his own Heathkit H8 personal computer from a kit. He then had to learn to program it, at which he also became expert. By 1975 he had written his first program, for airfoil calculations. He was starting to become a pioneer in the use of microcomputers in the field of Computational Fluid Dynamics (CFD).

Around this time he had a chance meeting with Professor Gerald Gregorek; an aerodynamicist at Ohio State University. Jerry Gregorek was impressed by Roncz's insightful questions and computer skills, and Roncz was impressed by Gregorek's answers. Roncz's knowledge and understanding grew, and so did his circle of helpful contacts, and his theories were put to the test in his computer programs, which were being worked so hard that he upgraded his Heathkit in an attempt to keep up.

Working with Gregorek at Ohio State University he noticed that their metal wind tunnel models were poorly made, and proposed a better way of making them. With his metal stamping experience, he designed and built a computerized milling machine and the software to control it, and Gemini Technologies went on to make models for the university and several other customers, including NASA.

=== Burt Rutan ===
Roncz had long been an admirer of Burt Rutan's homebuilt aircraft designs, and ordered a set of plans for the VariEze canard two-seat aircraft. Out of curiosity he decided to analyse the canard wing's shape on the computer, which astonished him by revealing that the canard couldn't fly, as it was stalled at all angles of attack. This was odd, as there were around 100 VariEzes actually flying with the canard and its Glasgow University (GU) airfoil. He then started a great effort to analyse what was happening in the VariEze and discovered how this particular use of the airfoil would work. This sort of work had not been done before in the range of low Reynolds numbers into which the VariEze falls. Working night and day, Roncz came up with theories which he tested on the computer, refining them and often finding answers. This hobby turned out to have great consequences.

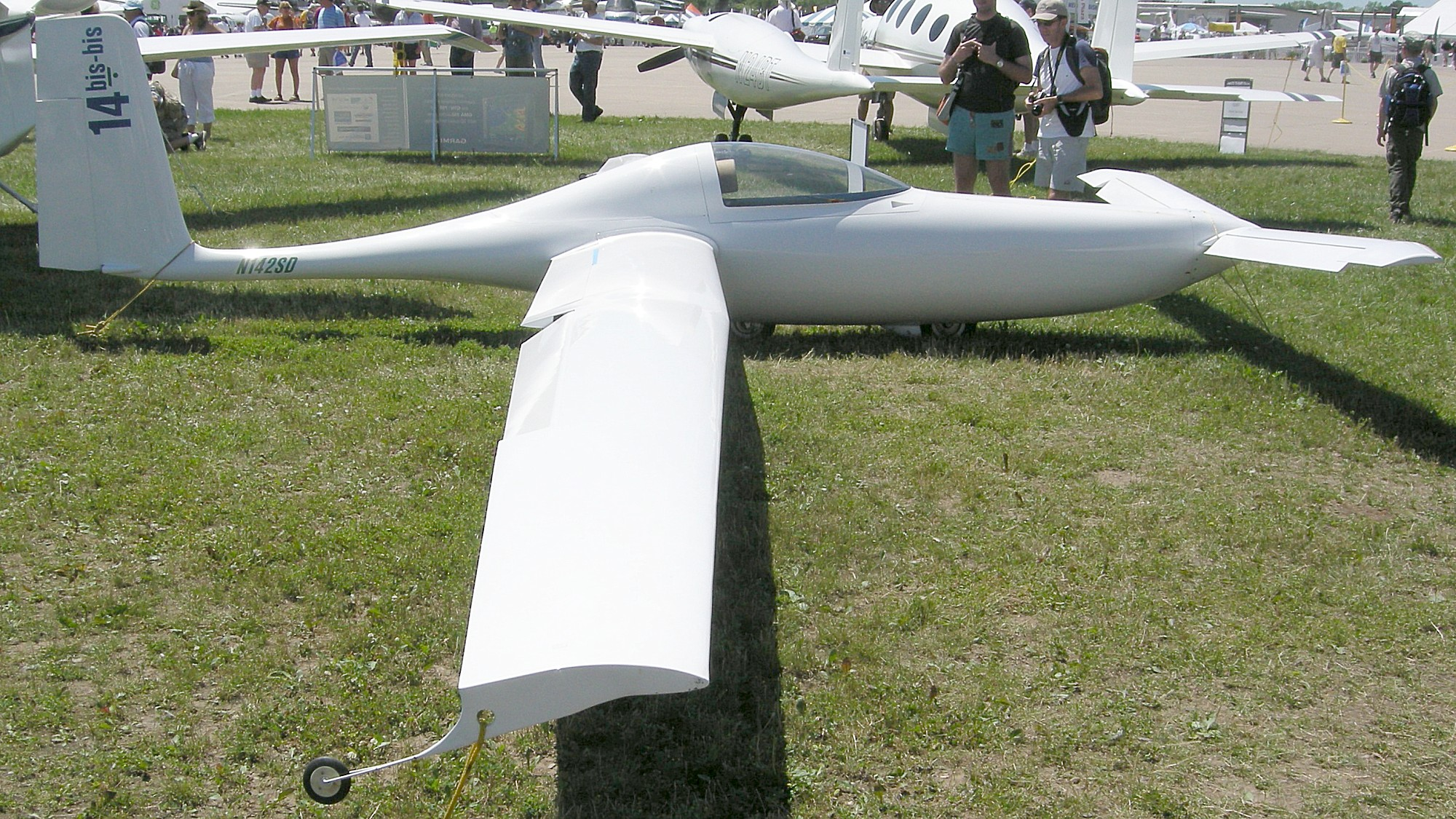
Rutan 77 Solitaire N142SD

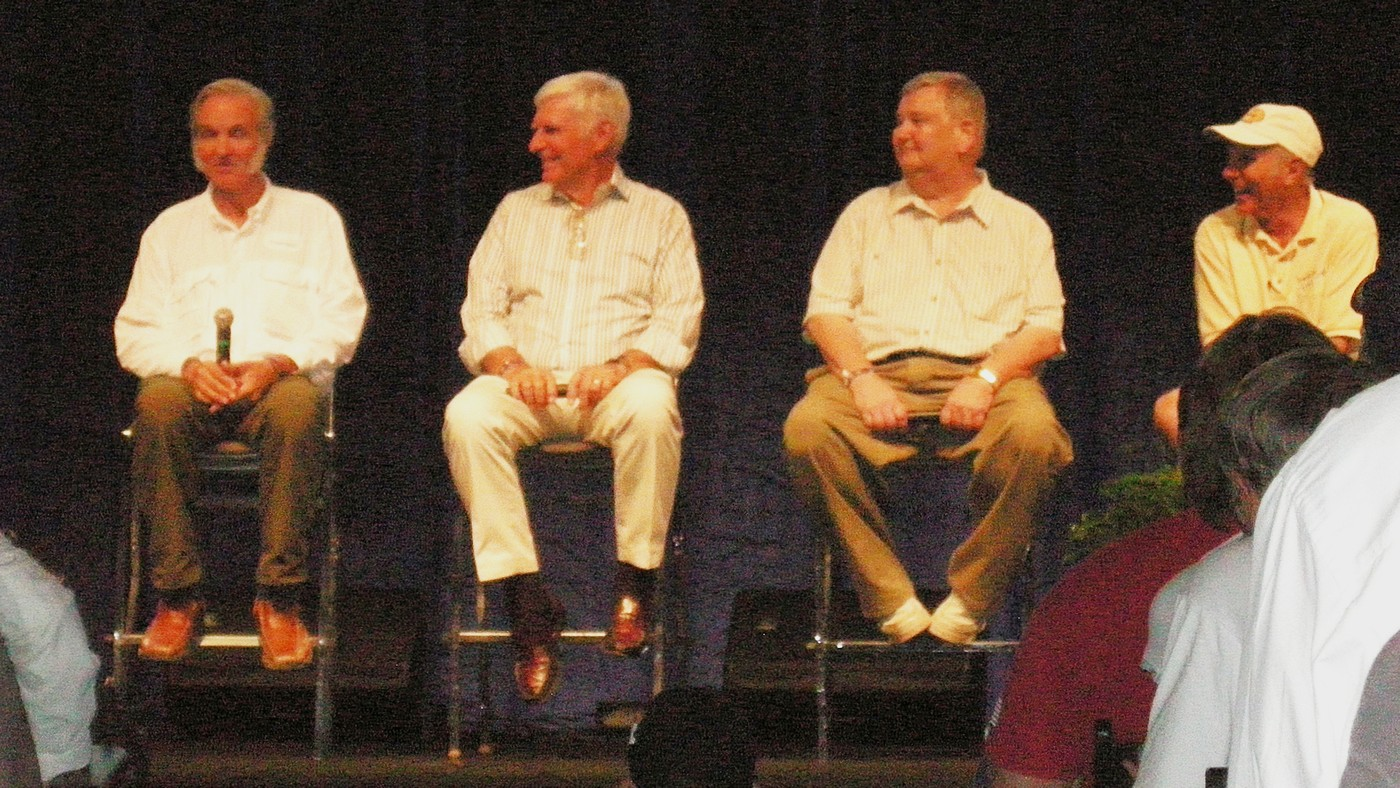
(Left to right) Burt and Dick Rutan, John Roncz and Mike Melvill at a Voyager 25th anniversary celebration in 2011.

Roncz read that Dick Rutan, Burt's brother and collaborator, was testing the new Rutan Long-EZ, a development of the VariEze, with a new canard airfoil. Roncz wrote to Dick to ask him for details, enclosing information he had gleaned from his GU research. Within a few days, Burt Rutan called him. He was looking for someone to evaluate the low Reynolds number airfoils that he had designed for his latest project, the Solitaire self-launching (motorized) glider. Roncz agreed to do that, and soon found that Burt's designs could be greatly improved by using one that Roncz had devised on his computer. A homebuilder of the Long-EZ built Roncz's airfoil into his new canard, and it proved very successful. Not only did it completely solve a serious problem of rain causing a dramatic loss of lift, but it significantly lowered rotation speed and slightly increased cruise speed. Roncz's design has been adopted by many Long-EZ builders.

==== Rutan aircraft ====
Roncz had become the go-to aerodynamicist for the homebuilts of Rutan Aircraft Factory (RAF) and the projects of Scaled Composites. The following list includes the 17 aircraft for which Roncz did the aerodynamics and airfoil design, listed in the order presented in the YouTube video.

- Model 77 Solitaire
- Model 61 Long-EZ (canard)
- Ganzer Gemini (canard) (Note: A variant of the Long-EZ with side-by-side seating and push-pull Volkswagen engines in the nose and tail developed by David Ganzer, a Rutan employee.)
- Model 76 Voyager
- Model 115 Starship 1 proof-of-concept
- Model 97 Lotus Microlight (Note: Built and flown for Colin Chapman, head of Lotus Cars). Project ended with his death.)
- Model 120 Predator (Note: Crop-duster - Rutan's first three-wing design.)
- Model 151 Ares
- Model 158 Pond Racer
- Model 133 ATTT
- Model 281 Proteus
- Model 81 Catbird
- Model 143 Triumph (Note: Developed for Beechcraft.)
- Tier 2+ (not built)
- Model 311 GlobalFlyer
- Model 226 Raptor (Note: Two drones (UAVs) built for the US government to test technology for detecting and neutralizing short-range ballistic missiles. They were manned by a pilot sitting astride the fuselage for their early flight tests.)
- Model 247 Visionaire Vantage

In addition to the known aircraft types worked on by Roncz for Scaled Composites, there were other projects, some worked on by Roncz, done for companies and probably arms of government paying for secret work, about which nothing has been made public.

==== The Beechcraft affair ====
In 1985 Beech bought Scaled Composites in the unsuccessful effort to build the Starship, and agreed to a five-year contract with Roncz for his services. In 1987 Beech terminated the contract with three years to run. Roncz sued and accepted a $2.2 million settlement. Despite a good prospect of a jury awarding up to $10 million in punitive damages, Roncz said that he felt it would be morally wrong to be vindictive.

=== Other aircraft ===
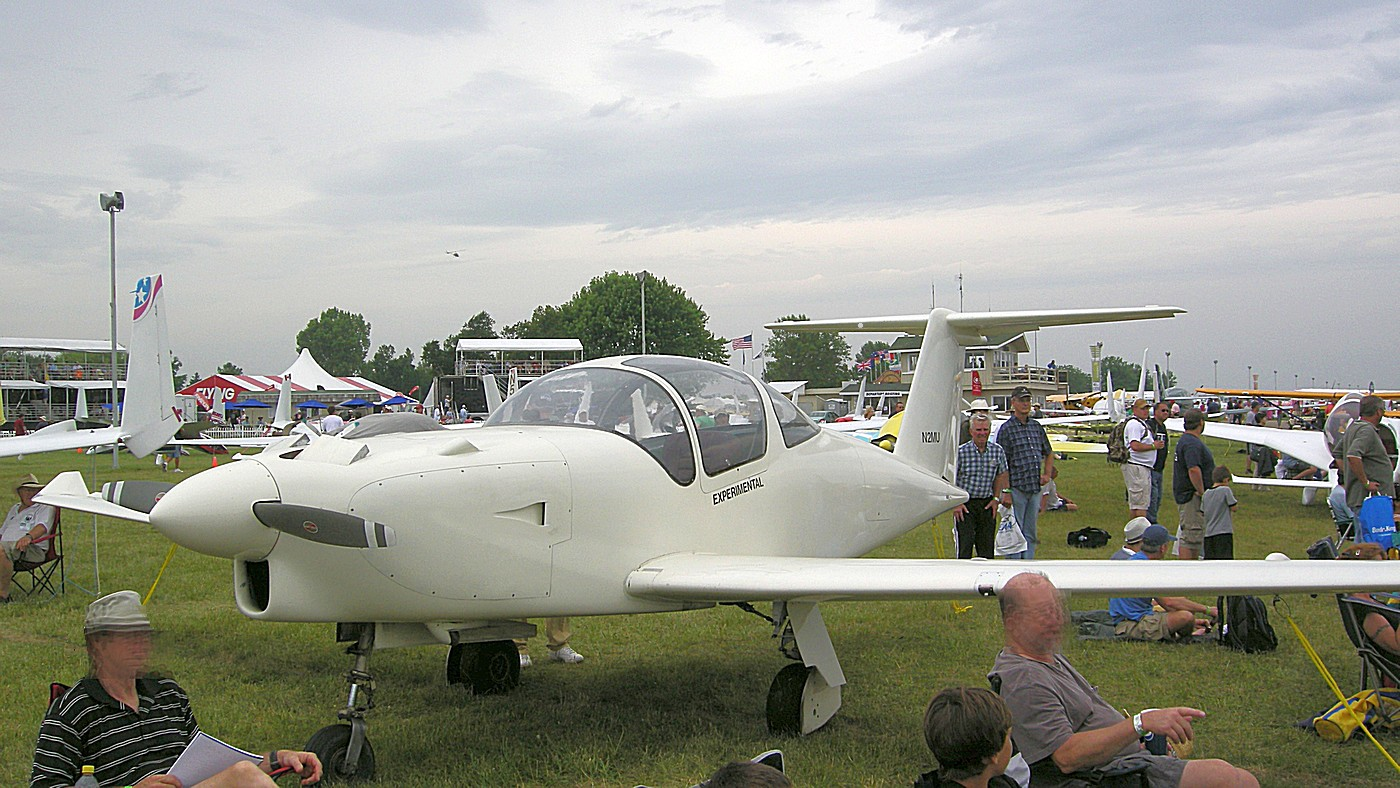
Garrison Melmoth 2 N2MU at EAA AirVenture Oshkosh in 2011

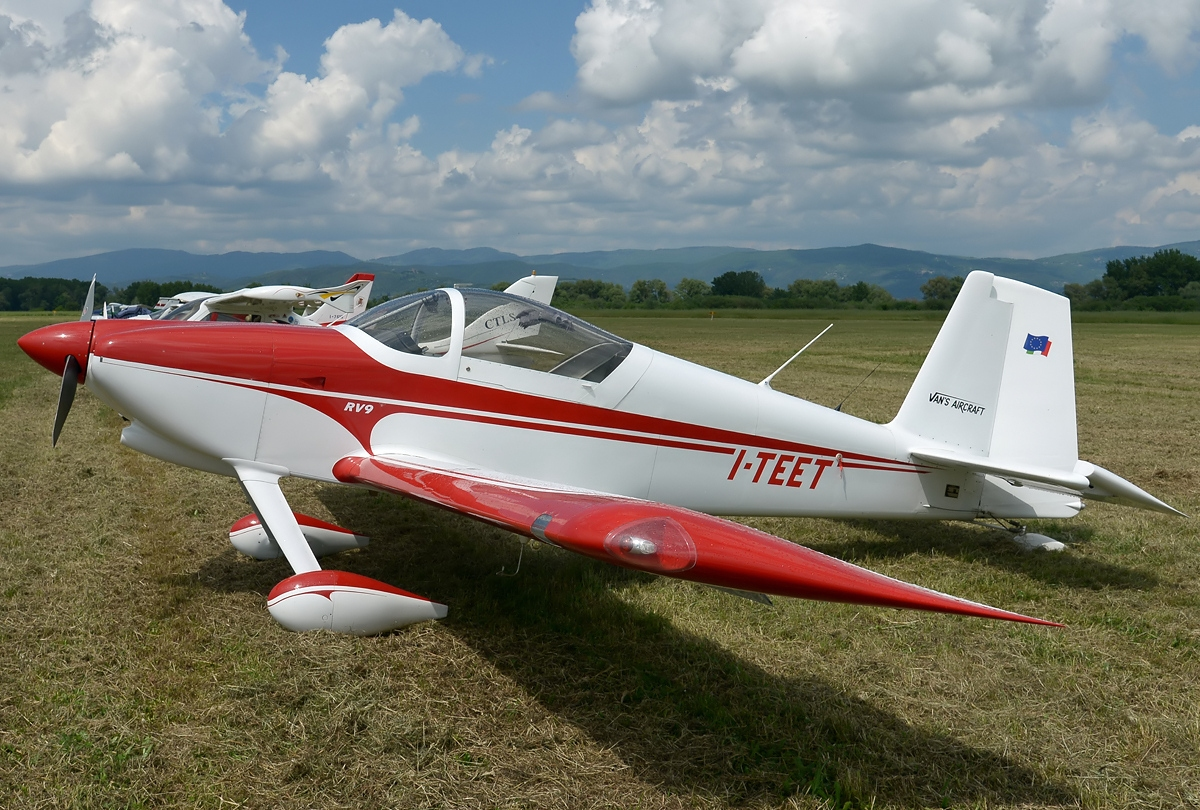
Vans RV-9

During his time working for Rutan, and after that period, Roncz was doing designs for many other projects. This list of the other aircraft that he worked on is not complete. It also doesn't include aircraft that used his airfoils without his direct input. (Note: Some of this list is derived from the guide produced by David Lednicer, who worked with Roncz at Gemini Technologies for three years.)

- Carter PAV
- Cirrus SR20 and SR22
- Cirrus/Israviation ST50
- Cozy III and Cozy IV
- Eagle Aircraft Eagle X-TS, Eagle 150, Eagle EX-P1, Eagle X
- Explorer Aircraft (AEA) Explorer
- Fighter Escort Wings 2/3 Mustang replica
- Freewing Freebird MK-IV
- Garrison Melmoth 2
- Glasair III winglets
- Group Genesis Genesis 1
- Icon A5
- Israel Aircraft Industries (and others) drones
- Keller Prospector STOL
- LAK Genesis 2 (Note: Developed from the Genesis 1 with Jim Marske, this was produced by Sportinė Aviacija (LAK) in Lithuania.)
- LoPresti Piper Swiftfire
- Roncz DLR (Note: Michael Dilley, Larry Lombard, John Roncz homebuilt project as detailed in Roncz's series of articles in Sport Aviation magazine running from February 1990 to February 1991. It became the AeroComposites Forte.)
- Vans RV-4
- Vans RV-9 (Note: Van's first ever airfoil change)
- Windecker Aircraft Tian Hu project
- Zivko Edge (Note: He had previously designed the airfoil for Bill Zivko's redesigned wing for the Stephens Akro/Laser aerobatic aircraft.)

=== Airfoil names ===
Roncz sometimes gave his airfoil designs fanciful names. These included:

- GOLA: Gobs of Lift Airfoil
- OSPITE: Olympic Swimming Pool in Trailing Edge
- POP: Peter's Other Profile
- SODA: Stamp Out Drag Airfoil

and the suffix MS stood for the initials of Mike and Sally Melvill. (Note: Mike and Sally both worked at Scaled Composites. Mike was the chief test pilot.)

=== Other projects ===
==== Nautical ====
- In 1988 Scaled Composites was commissioned to build the carbon-fibre wing for Stars & Stripes, a 90 ft (27 m) racing catamaran. Roncz was the aerodynamicist for the project. After the first wing was completed, the race's venue changed from Long Beach, California to San Diego, California, necessitating an increase in the wing's height from 94 ft (29 m) to 108 ft (33 m). The new wing was designed and built within 8 weeks, and the catamaran went on to win the race convincingly. Roncz also designed the rudders.
- Roncz redesigned the keel of the America III racing yacht which won several San Diego races.
- Roncz completely redesigned the airfoils of the Airfish 2 wing-in-ground-effect (WIG or WIGE) vehicle which was developed from the RFB X-114 designed by Alexander Lippisch. He worked with the US company Flarecraft Inc.

==== Motor racing ====
- Roncz used his CFD skills to refine the aerodynamics of the Riley & Scott Mk III prototype World Sports Car (WSC) race car.

=== Lectures ===
Roncz often featured in forums at EAA AirVenture Oshkosh during the 1980s and 90s. His sessions were always popular for his wit and wisdom. Lecture titles included "The Aerodynamics of the Flight of Dragons", "Drag Reduction for Aircraft" (as Gemini Technologies), "Can Dragons Fly?" and, with Burt Rutan, a "Tent Talk Show" and "Life, the Universe and Everything Else".

He was a Distinguished Lecturer for the American Institute of Aeronautics and Astronautics and a visiting lecturer at eight universities.

=== Patents and awards ===
Over his aerodynamics career, Roncz gained at least eight patents, usually as part of a team of inventors, and gained several awards including:

- the 1985 Stan Dzik Award for outstanding airfoil design contribution.
- the 1990 August Raspet Memorial Award for outstanding contributions to the advancement of the design of light aircraft, presented to him by EAA President Tom Poberezny.
- the 1991 Milwaukee School of Engineering and EAA Gold medal for distinguished achievement in aerospace engineering.
- the GAPAN Grand Master's Australian Medal for co-designing the Eagle Aircraft Eagle 150, which he received from Prince Philip at the Guildhall in London on October 24, 2000.

== Other interests ==
Alongside the aerodynamics, Roncz led a second life as a medium in Spiritualism. For this he would regularly visit Arthur Findlay College, near London Stansted Airport in England to participate in their sessions. He also wrote a book about it, entitled An Engineer's Guide to the Spirit World: My Journey from Skeptic to Psychic Medium, published in 2012 (Note: Published by CreateSpace Independent Publishing Platform, ISBN 9781478221944) and still widely available in 2026.

Roncz was also a member of the Sinai Synagogue, and participated in the reading of the Torah.

== Death ==
John Roncz died of cancer on September 27, 2023, in Lakeville, Indiana, in the South Bend area which had been his main residence throughout his life.
