= Markmann =

Markmann is a Danish surname. Notable people with the surname include:

- Frederik Markmann (1848–1927), Danish football executive
- Josephine Markmann (born 1993), German activist and former member of the feminist group FEMEN
- Noah Markmann (born 2007), Danish footballer
- Rosa Markmann (1907–2009), the Chilean First Lady from 1946 to 1952
