= Maeda Ku-1 =

Japanese military glider

Ku-1
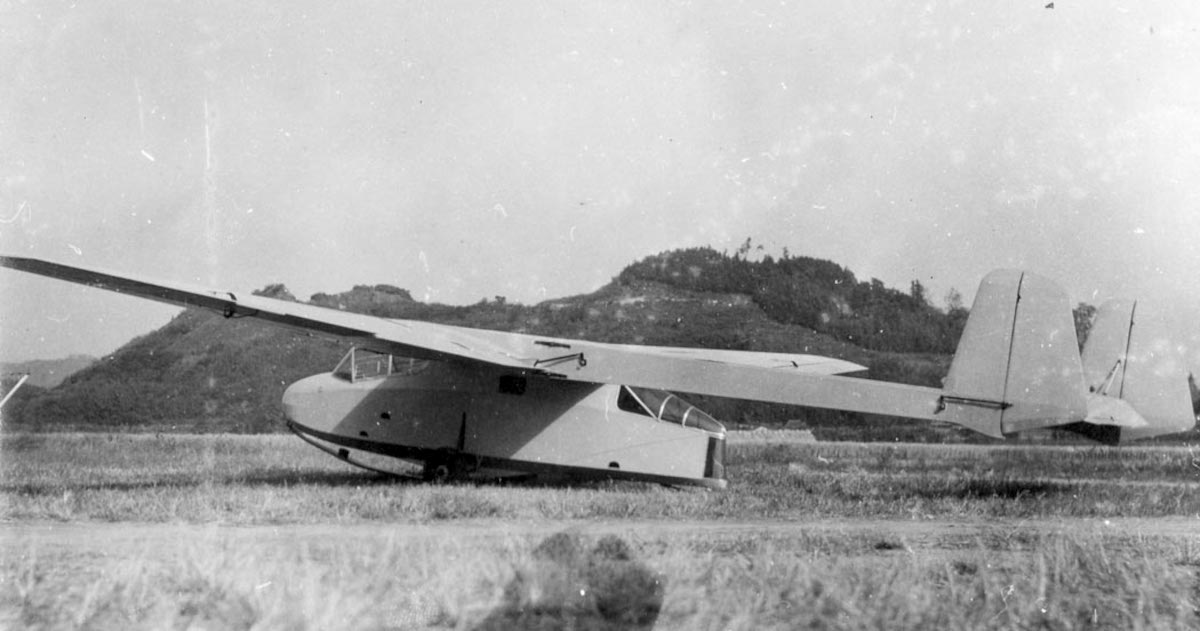

General information
- Type: Transport glider
- National origin: Japan
- Manufacturer: Maeda
- Designer: Professor Hiroshi Sato
- Status: retired
- Primary user: Imperial Japanese Army Air Force
- Number built: 100

History
- First flight: January 9, 1941
- Variants: Maeda Ku-7

The Maeda Ku-1, long designation Maeda Army Type 2 Small Glider, was a small twin boom Japanese military glider. It was primarily used for training, and was superseded by the Kokusai Ku-7, which was effectively a scaled-up version of the design. Approximately 100 were produced.

== Design and development ==
Professor Hirosho Sato of the Imperial university engineering college at Kyushu designed an assault glider for the Imperial Japanese Army (IJA) in response to news of airborne assaults in Europe. The prototype was manufactured by Maeda Aircraft Corporation and designated Ku-1 (Ku - from Kakku - to glide). Once accepted for production the glider was given the long designation Maeda Army Type 2 Small Glider.

The Ku-1 was built almost entirely from wood / plywood and was a high-wing glider with twin boom tail sporting a fin and rudder at the end of each boom, with a tail-plane and elevator between the boom ends. The fuselage pod was given a streamlined shape, but with flat sides and a cockpit for two forward of the wing. The undercarriage consisted of two spatted main-wheels on short axles either side of the fuselage, with skids at nose and tail ends of the fuselage pod. The booms, attached to the wing centre-section, were wire-braced horizontally and the fins were braced by short struts on the inboard faces. Passengers and cargo were housed in the cabin below the wing, aft of the cockpit. The three piece wing consisted of the centre-section, attached to the fuselage pod and two outer panels which were tapered and carried the ailerons for roll control.

== Variants ==
Ku-1-I
Baseline production glider;100 built.
Ku-1-II
Transparent nose, single tail boom and longer fuselage, prototype only.
Ku-1-III
An aerofoil section fuselage with tapered wings, prototype only.

== Specifications (Ku-1) ==
Data from ENCYKLOPEDIA UZBROJENIA, Fighting gliders of World War II

General characteristics

- Crew: 2
- Capacity: 8 troops, equipped / 600 kg (1,320 lb) cargo
- Length: 9.75 m (32 ft 0 in) fuselage
- Wingspan: 16.76 m (55 ft 0 in)
- Wing area: 30.1 m^{2} (324 sq ft)
- Aspect ratio: 9.7
- Empty weight: 698.5 kg (1,540 lb)
- Gross weight: 1,297 kg (2,859 lb)

Performance

- Never exceed speed: 177 km/h (110 mph, 96 kn)
- Maximum towing speed: 129 km/h (80 mph; 70 kn)

== See also ==
- List of aircraft of World War II
- List of World War II military gliders
