= Mlody Lotnik glider =

Mlody Lotnik

General information
- Type: Single-seat basic glider
- National origin: Poland
- Designer: Antoni Uszacki

History
- First flight: 1926–27

The Mlody Lotnik glider, commonly shortened to Mlody Lotnik, was the result of a 1926 initiative from the Polish magazine Mlody Lotnik ("Young Aviator") to provide plans and instructions for a homebuilt, low cost, basic glider with the aim of popularizing gliding and aviation amongst the young.

== Design and development ==
In mid-1926 the Polish magazine Mlody Lotnik published details of a basic glider, designed by Antoni Uszacki, financed by LOPP and with technical help and operational guidance from W.C.B.L and Władyslaw Zalewski, offering low cost, detailed plans and constructional advice. Several were built by Mlody Lotnik's young readership, some incorporating their own modifications. To introduce new pilots to flying, the Mlody Lotnik could be operated as a manned kite, then later in their training launched conventionally.

Both the wing and the fuselage of the Mlody Lotnik were unusual. By 1926 biplane gliders, never common, had almost disappeared but the Mlody Lotnik was an all-wood single bay biplane. Its wings were braced on each side with a pair of parallel, vertical interplane struts which projected above the upper surface, assisted by wires both above and between the wings. Its upper and lower wings had unequal spans but no stagger. Fabric covering was applied only to the wing undersides.

Wooden, open frame fuselage gliders were common before World War II. Most, like the influential German Zögling and the Polish Wallis S.1, had a single frame but some had two frames in parallel like the Karpiński SL.1 Akar. The Mlody Lotnik mixed these forms with a fuselage with a narrow Y-shape plan, forked forwards but single aft. Built principally from a mixture of 50 and 25 mm (1.97 and 0.98 in) diameter pine rods, the upper and lower chords were almost parallel, cross braced with vertical and diagonal members. The pilot's completely open seat and controls were mounted across the fork under the wing leading edge. Each branch of the Y carried a landing skid, U-shaped in profile; alternatively, take-offs and landings could be made on the pilot's feet.

The frames merged at the penultimate vertical cross member, where the empennage began. A delta-plan tailplane was mounted on the top of the frame and extended rearwards to the final cross-member, which reached above the frame and formed the rudder post. The Mlody Lotnik's fin started at the same point as the tailplane and was also triangular, though low; the rudder, a cropped rectangle in profile, extended to the bottom of the frame. All tail surfaces were fabric-covered.

The first group to complete an example of the Mlody Lotnik was the Warsaw 'Start' Aviation Circle, who incorporated some improvements and named their aircraft the K.S.L.1. This was also on show at the 1927 LOPP exhibition in Warsaw. It is not known how many other examples were completed and flown; another modified Mlody Lotnik was built by pupils at the National Industrial School in Kraków, directed by Arcinowski.

== Variants ==
K.L.S.1
Improved Mlody Lotnik designed and built by the Warsaw-based students of the 'Start' Aviation Circle.

== Specifications ==
Data from J. Cynk, 1971 unless noted

General characteristics

- Crew: One
- Length: 4.165 m (13 ft 8 in)
- Upper wingspan: 7 m (23 ft 0 in)
- Lower wingspan: 5 m (16 ft 5 in)
- Height: 2.25 m (7 ft 5 in)
- Wing area: 12.5 m^{2} (135 sq ft)
- Empty weight: 35 kg (77 lb)
- Gross weight: 100 kg (220 lb)

Performance

- Cruise speed: 34 km/h (21 mph, 18 kn)
- Rate of sink: 1.4 m/s (280 ft/min)
