= MRSz A-08 Sirály =

A-08 Sirály
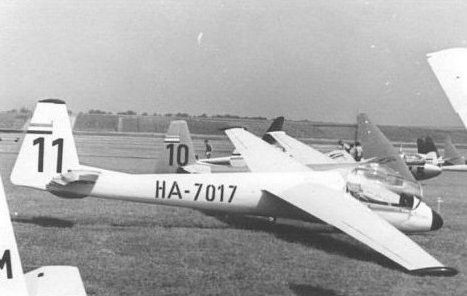
- Sirály II

General information
- Type: Competition sailplane
- National origin: Hungary
- Manufacturer: Central Workshop of the Hungarian Aeronautical Association (MRSz - Magyar Repülési Szövetség Központi Műhelye), Dunakeszi.
- Designer: Ferenc Zsebő (team leader)
- Number built: 4

History
- First flight: May 1956

The MRSz A-08 Sirály (Seagull) was a Hungarian high performance glider designed to compete in the 1956 and 1958 World Gliding Championships. It was unsuccessful at this level but set a notable number of national records.

== Design and development ==
Hungary had not previously competed in the World Gliding Championships but MÖHOSZ, which organized all sports flying, called for a design to take part in the 1956 event, scheduled to take place at Saint-Yan in France. A team led by Ferenc Zsebő at the Dunakeszi-based MRSz (Central Workshop of the Hungarian Aeronautical Association) responded, though time was short, resulting in a conservative and under-developed design, which first flew in May 1956.

The 1956 Sirály I was a largely wooden aircraft. Its two-part shoulder wing was built around a single spar with wooden flanges. In the inner part of the wing the webs were also wooden but the outer parts had duralumin webs which were glued to the flanges. The wing were covered with a double plywood layer to optimize finish and small "salmon" fairings were placed at the tips. Split Frise-type ailerons filled the outer third of the trailing edge. Inboard there were laps intended as airbrakes instead of the more usual spoilers, which allowed two 30 L (1.1 cu ft) water ballast tanks to be placed in the wings. Early flights showed the airbrakes were ineffective and they were supplemented by a tail-mounted 1.6 m (5 ft 3 in) drogue parachute. On the Siraly II, flown two years later, the parachute and flaps were replaced by Göttingen-type spoilers which opened both above and below the wing, located just behind the spar well inboard of the ailerons.

Both Sirály variants had oval section, ply-covered semi-monocoque fuselages that tapered aft to the tail. The pilot's cockpit was ahead of the wing leading edge and under a one-piece canopy which blended smoothly into the deeper rear fuselage. The region ahead of the wing was slightly different on the Sirály II, with a little longer and deeper nose and a slightly more humped canopy with curvatures adjusted to minimize optical distortions. The landing gear changes were more obvious. The Sirály I had a long landing skid from the nose to the leading edge and used a two-wheeled dolly just aft of the skid for take-offs. In contrast, the Sirály II's nose-skid was much shorter and it had a retractable, sprung monowheel under the trailing edge. Both variants had a small tailskid.

The rear fuselage and empennage were the same in both variants. The horizontal tail, trapezoidal in plan, was mounted just above the fuselage on the base of the fin and on a long, shallow strake forward of it, placing the elevators ahead of the rudder. Both fin and rudder were approximately trapezoidal in profile.

== Operational history ==
The 1956 World Gliding Championships at Saint-Yan opened at the end of June, so there was only a month to refine the Sirály Is and for their pilots, L. Kalmar and G. Mezo, to familiarize themselves with their characteristics. The results were predictably disappointing, with Kalmar 25th overall and Mezo 37th.

Both pilots at Saint Yen had been further handicapped by the absence of flaps. The Sirály II, designed to compete in the next World Gliding Championships, scheduled to be held in Lezno, Poland in June 1958, was therefore fitted with them. Once again, the two aircraft were not flown until May and their pilots' unfamiliarity with them led again to disappointing results, not making the top twenty of a field of thirty-seven.

Though unsuccessful at world level, the Sirálys set several national records, particularly for speed over triangular courses of various distances, straight line speed and out-and-return distances.

== Variants ==
A-08 Sirály I
Two built for 1956 World Gliding Championships, Saint-Yan.
A-08b Sirály II
Two built for 1958 World Gliding Championships, Lezno.

== Specifications (Sirály I) ==
Data from Gabor, F

General characteristics

- Crew: One
- Length: 7.6 m (24 ft 11 in)
- Wingspan: 17.6 m (57 ft 9 in)
- Wing area: 16.2 m^{2} (174 sq ft)
- Aspect ratio: 19.2
- Airfoil: NACA 64(3)-618
- Empty weight: 280 kg (617 lb)
- Gross weight: 430 kg (948 lb) including 60 kg (130 lb) ballast

Performance

- Maximum speed: 180 km/h (110 mph, 97 kn) with open airbrakes
- Stall speed: 68 km/h (42 mph, 37 kn)
- Maximum glide ratio: 33.3 at 86 km/h (53 mph; 46 kn)
- Rate of sink: 0.68 m/s (134 ft/min) at 80 km/h (50 mph; 43 kn)
- Maximum speed in rough air: 150 km/h (93 mph; 81 kn)
