= Moswey III =

General information
- Type: Glider
- National origin: Switzerland
- Manufacturer: Moswey Segelflugzeug-Werke
- Designer: Georg Mueller
- Status: Production completed
- Number built: more than 30

History
- Introduction date: 1938

The Moswey III is a Swiss mid-wing, single-seat, gull winged glider that was designed by Georg Mueller and produced by Moswey Segelflugzeug-Werke.

== Design and development ==
The Moswey series of gliders was developed prior to the Second World War in 1938. The third model was the first one to achieve full production status.

The aircraft is built from wood. The fuselage is a monocoque design, while the wings and tail surfaces are a wooden frame covered in doped aircraft fabric covering. The fuselage is of a hexagonal section forward and a diamond section aft. The fuselage is built upon a main keel beam that also contains the control runs. The 14.0 m (45.9 ft) span wing is a gulled design, employing a Goettingen 535 airfoil, with air brakes for glidepath control. The structure is stressed for aerobatics at +/-12g.

The Moswey III was constructed by building the fuselage around a large tube, which was then removed after construction.

The cockpit is noted for its small dimensions, with the wing roots providing the pilot's shoulder and elbow room.

The Moswey III was not type certified and at least 30 were built.

== Operational history ==
One Moswey III was imported into the United States and remains on the Federal Aviation Administration aircraft registry in the Experimental - Racing/Exhibition category.

== Specifications (Moswey III) ==
Data from Soaring

General characteristics

- Crew: one
- Wingspan: 14.0 m (45 ft 11 in)
- Wing area: 12.6 m^{2} (136 sq ft)
- Aspect ratio: 15.5
- Airfoil: Goettingen 535
- Empty weight: 138 kg (304 lb)
- Gross weight: 238 kg (524 lb)

Performance

- g limits: +/-12
- Maximum glide ratio: 27:1
- Rate of sink: 0.67 m/s (132 ft/min)
- Wing loading: 18.8 kg/m^{2} (3.85 lb/sq ft)

== See also ==
Related lists

- List of gliders
