= Marske Pioneer =

American glider

Pioneer
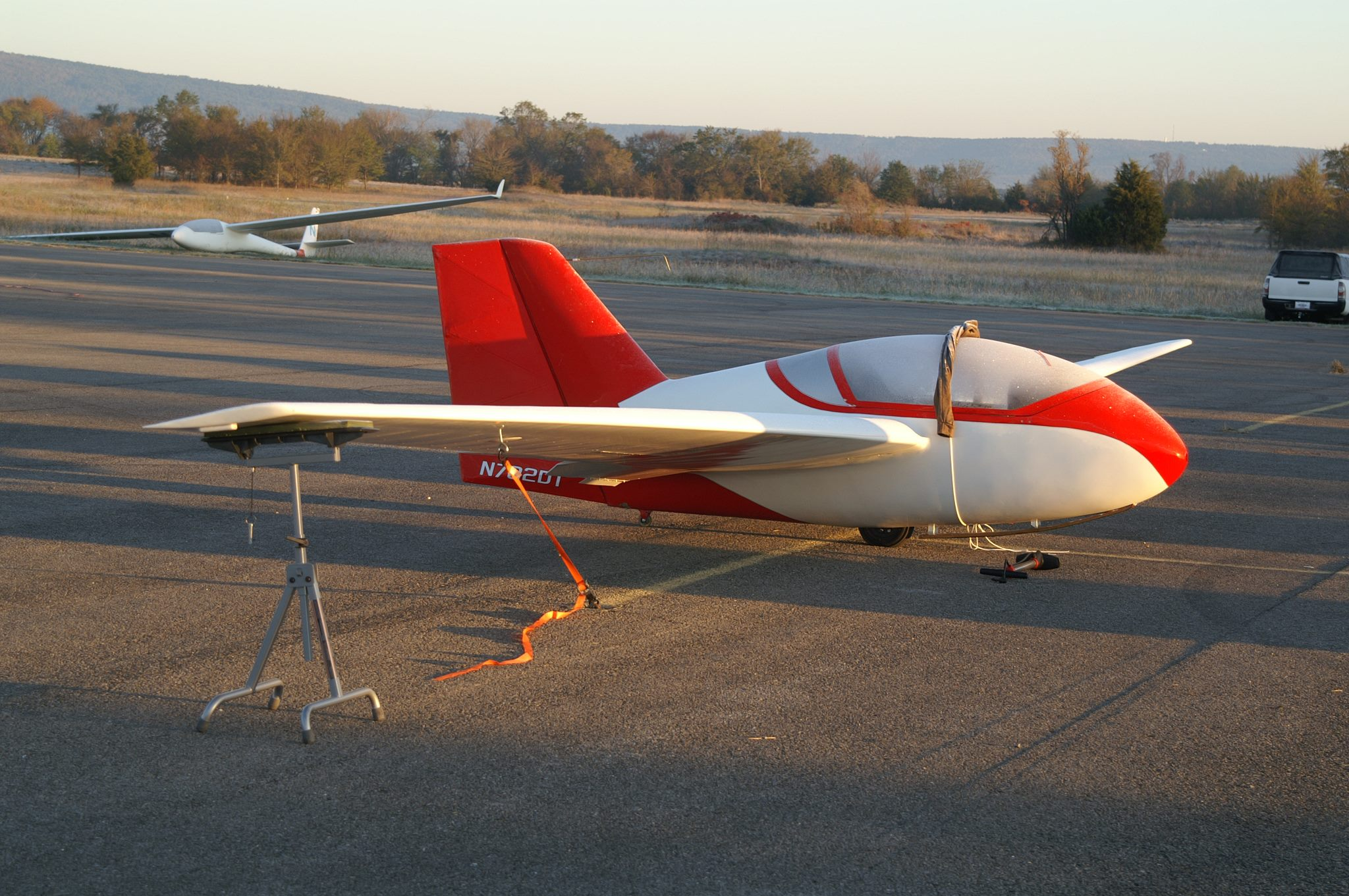
- Pioneer IId

General information
- Type: Glider
- National origin: United States
- Manufacturer: Marske Aircraft Corporation
- Designer: Jim Marske
- Number built: 1 (Pioneer I) at least 16 (Pioneer II)

History
- First flight: 1968
- Developed from: Marske XM-1

The Marske Pioneer is a family of American, single-seat, mid-wing, tailless gliders that was designed by Jim Marske. The Pioneer II version was available as plans and in kit form from Marske Aircraft Corporation for amateur construction.

== Design and development ==
The first Pioneer began as an aircraft construction project of Walt MacFarlane in 1965, but he did not complete the aircraft. The partially completed project was purchased by Bill Daniels and Jim Marske in 1967, who completed it and first flew the aircraft in 1968. That prototype, serial number 1, registered N7910 was still registered to Daniels in 2011.

In its original configuration the Pioneer had a 40 ft (12.2 m) wingspan. The aircraft was constructed with a wood and doped fabric wing, with the fuselage made from steel tube and fiberglass. The design features a fixed monowheel landing gear, flaps for glide-path control and spoilers for roll control instead of the more usual ailerons.

The original Pioneer was modified with wing extensions, bringing the span to 46 ft (14.0 m) and it was re-designated the Pioneer IA. In this configuration the aircraft can fly as slowly as 28 kn (52 km/h) or as fast as 140 kn (259 km/h).

The original design was simplified for homebuilt construction, retaining the wood and fabric wing construction, but the fuselage was changed to a fiberglass structure. The wingspan was shortened to 42.64 ft (13.0 m) to allow the wings to be built in a standard 20 ft (6.1 m) deep garage. Unlike on the original design, roll control was changed to ailerons, with upper surface spoilers paired with lower surface dive brakes for glidepath control. Because the aircraft is tailless the centre of gravity range is very narrow. To simplify weight and balance considerations the monowheel landing gear is located on the desired C of G and the pilot's seat is adjustable fore-and-aft. The pilot simply moves the seat until the aircraft balances on the wheel to ensure that the balance is within the center-of-gravity range. The empty weight is 390 lb (177 kg) with a gross weight of 630 lb (286 kg). The aircraft manages a 35:1 glide ratio and a minimum sink of 2.26 ft/s (0.69 m/s).

Starting in 1972 the Pioneer II was made available as plans or as a kit. The kit included a pre-made fiberglass fuselage shell. Reported building times range from 600 to 2000 hours. At least one Pioneer II was modified with a 45.93 ft (14.0 m) wingspan.

Marske has built a prototype Pioneer III, an all-composite variant of the basic design. The Pioneer III is intended to be 100 lb (45 kg) lighter than the Pioneer II, produce a 20% drag reduction and be optimized for flight in weak lift conditions.

== Operational history ==
Pioneer IIs have made flights of over 300 mi (483 km).

In March 2011 there were seven Pioneer IIs registered in the US, along with the original Pioneer IA and the prototype Pioneer 3. In March 2011 there were four Pioneer IIs registered in Canada.

== Variants ==
Pioneer I
Original model, 40 ft (12.2 m) wingspan
Pioneer IA
Original model with extended 46 ft (14.0 m) wingspan
Pioneer II
Redesigned model for home-building, with 42.64 ft (13.0 m) wingspan
Pioneer IIA
root:NACA 23012R; tip:NACA 23010R, with short canopy.
Pioneer IIB
root:NACA 33012R; tip:NACA 33010R, with a longer canopy.
Pioneer IIC
modified root:NACA 33012R; tip:NACA 33010R sections, with structural refinements and improvements in the cockpit area.
Pioneer IID
Modified Pioneer II with swept vertical tail and a modified wing leading edge, giving a glide ratio of 35:1.

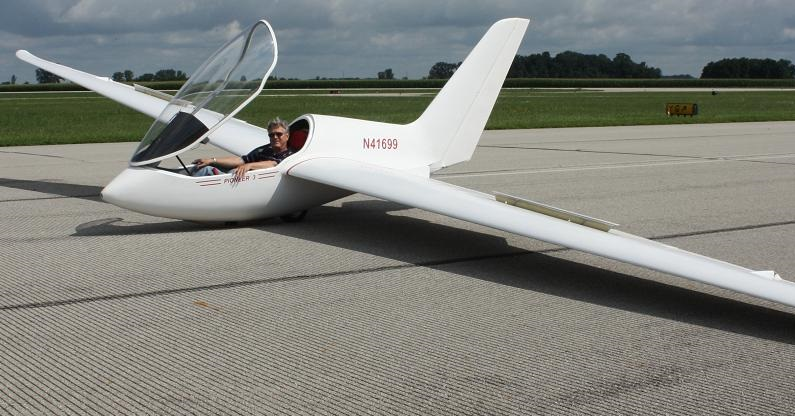
Pioneer III prototype

Pioneer III
Improved model with swept tail and all-composite construction and a 49.2 ft (15.0 m) wingspan, prototype registered in 2004.

Pioneer IV

Pioneer III fuselage with retractable gear and all new racing wing, built by Kollman Composites. New glide ratio of 48:1 and good high speed performance.

== Specifications (Pioneer IIC) ==
Data from Jane's All the World's Aircraft 1988-89

General characteristics

- Crew: one
- Length: 12 ft 6 in (3.81 m)
- Wingspan: 46 ft 0 in (14.02 m)
- Height: 6 ft 6 in (1.98 m)
- Wing area: 144 sq ft (13.4 m^{2})
- Aspect ratio: 12.6:1
- Airfoil: modified root:NACA 33012R; tip:NACA 33010R sections
- Empty weight: 360 lb (163 kg)
- Gross weight: 650 lb (295 kg)

Performance

- Never exceed speed: 113 kn (130 mph, 209 km/h) in rough and smooth air
- Max aero-tow speed: 87 kn; 100 mph (161 km/h)
- Max winch-launch speed: 61 kn; 70 mph (113 km/h)
- g limits: +5.3 -2.65
- Maximum glide ratio: 35:1
- Best glide speed: 52 kn; 60 mph (97 km/h)
- Rate of sink: 140 ft/min (0.7 m/s) *Minimum sink speed: 39 kn; 45 mph (72 km/h)
- Wing loading: 4.5 lb/sq ft (22 kg/m^{2})

Pioneer IV specsGeneral characteristics

- Crew: one
- Wingspan: 49.2 ft (15.0 m)
- Wing area: 137 sq ft (12.7 m^{2})
- Aspect ratio: 18.5
- Airfoil: Root: M-451, Tip M-35a
- Empty weight: 450 lb (204 kg)
- Gross weight: 960 lb (435 kg) Pilot: 260 LBS, Water: 250 LBS.

Performance

- Cruise speed: 110 kn (130 mph, 210 km/h) 23:1
- Never exceed speed: 130 kn (150 mph, 240 km/h)
- Maximum glide ratio: 48:1

== See also ==
- List of gliders
