= Muraszew-Tomaszewski MT 1 =

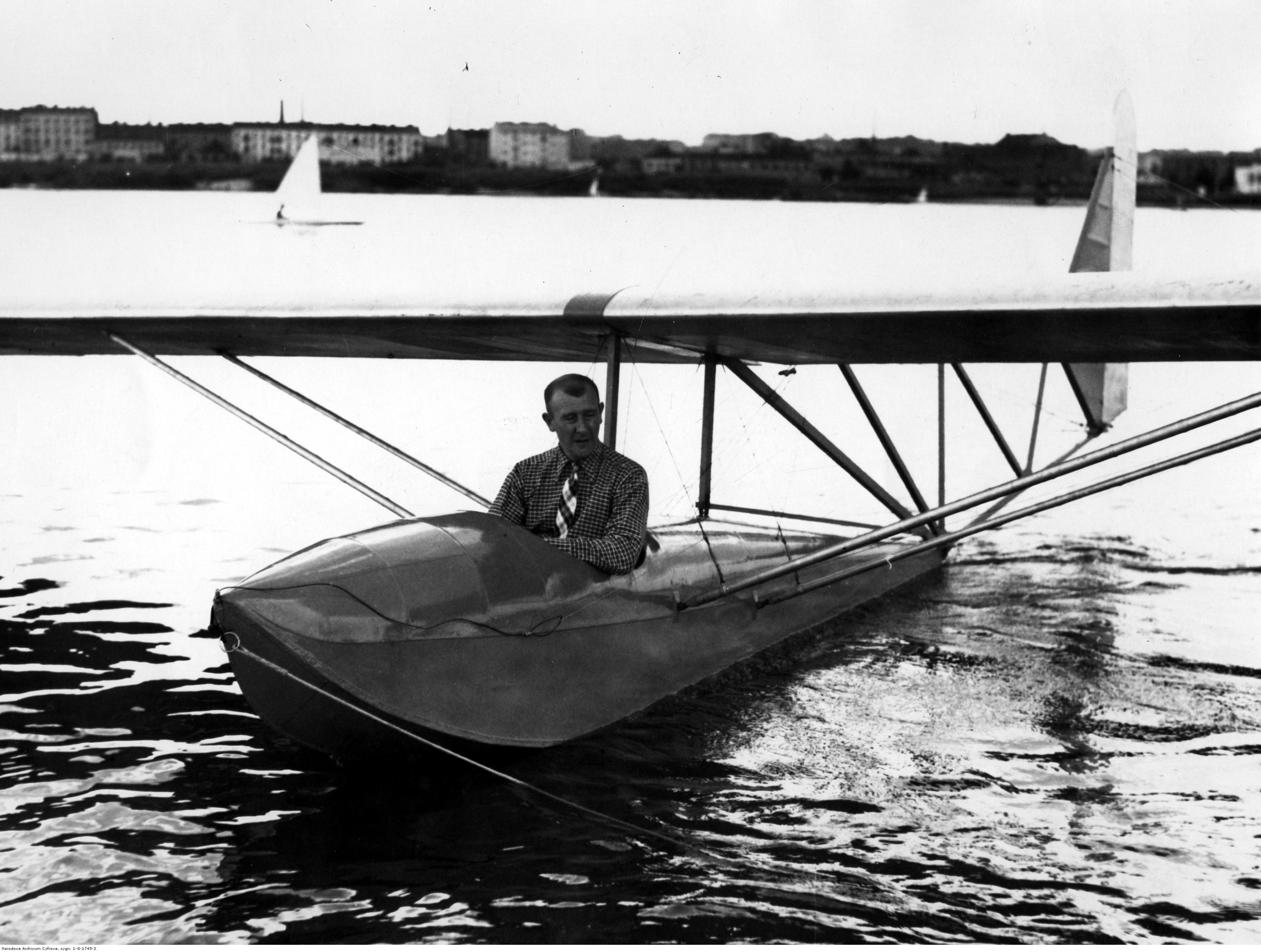

General information
- Type: Flying boat trainer glider
- National origin: Poland
- Manufacturer: Scouts' Glider Centre Workshops
- Designer: Aleksander Muraszew and Kazimierz Tomaszewski
- Number built: 1

History
- First flight: 1 May 1936

The Muraszew-Tomaszewski MT 1 was a single seat flying boat training glider designed and built in Poland in the 1930s. It was successfully tested with take-offs from rivers, sea and land but no government funding followed and only one was completed.

== Design and development ==
Water-based gliders are rare but several were flown in the 1920s and 1930s. In Germany the Akaflieg München Mü1 Vogel Roch was first flown in 1924 and the DFS Seeadler in 1935. Like them the Polish Muraszew-Tomaszewski MT 1, which flew in 1936, was a flying boat. Its designers, Aleksander Muraszew and Kazimierz Tomaszewski, were students of Warsaw Technical University who were informed by the work done there by Czesław Witoszyński on the aerodynamics and hydrodynamics of floats and hulls. Their 1935 studies were refined in the wind tunnel at the Warsaw Aerodynamic Institute and construction was funded by the Naval and Colonial League (LMK) and the Riflemen's Association. Work by the Scout's Glider Workshops (HWS) in Warsaw began in August 1935 and was completed the following spring. Its first flight was on 1 May 1936.

The MT 1 was a wooden open frame (uncovered flat girder fuselage) aircraft with its wing mounted on top of the fuselage. The two-part wing was built around two spars and was rectangular in plan out to rounded tips. The leading edge was plywood-covered, the rest fabric-covered. A pair of parallel struts braced the spars to the lower longeron on each side. Stability on the water was provided by a short float mounted not far below each wingtip.

The fuselage girder had a straight, horizontal upper longeron or chord and a curved lower longeron, braced together with a series of diagonal and vertical members. At the front there was a wood-framed, ply-covered nacelle which contained the open, single-seat cockpit. It was divided into three sealed compartments for buoyancy and had a single-step planing bottom. Wire-braced fixed rear surfaces were ply-covered and the control surfaces fabric-covered. Its triangular fin stretched above and below the upper longeron, carrying a straight-edged, round-topped rudder which ran down to the lower longeron. Its triangular tailplane was mounted on the upper longeron with ground-adjustable incidence.

The MT 1 was easily converted for land use by adding a rubber-sprung landing skid to the hull underside. The floats were designed to be rapidly removable.

== Operational history ==
The first flight on 1 May 1936 was followed by land-based flight testing, flown by Wacław Ulass and Mieczyław Szczudłowski. After twenty flights the MT 1 was moved to the Warsaw Yacht Club on the River Vistula where it was tow-launched behind a hydroplane. These trials showed that the MT 1 handled well on both land and water as well as in flight.

Later in 1936 the glider was moved to a government base on the Augustowskie lakes, then, with growing interest from the Navy, to Puck for sea-worthiness trials. These led to the fitting of larger floats and with them many satisfactory take-offs and flights were made in 1937 in a range of sea states. Three pilots were trained as sea-glider instructors; there were thoughts of a sea-gliding club but no government support followed. In 1938 it returned to Warsaw, notionally for land-based trial with the Suwałki Gliding Circle, though they showed little interest in it.

== Specifications ==
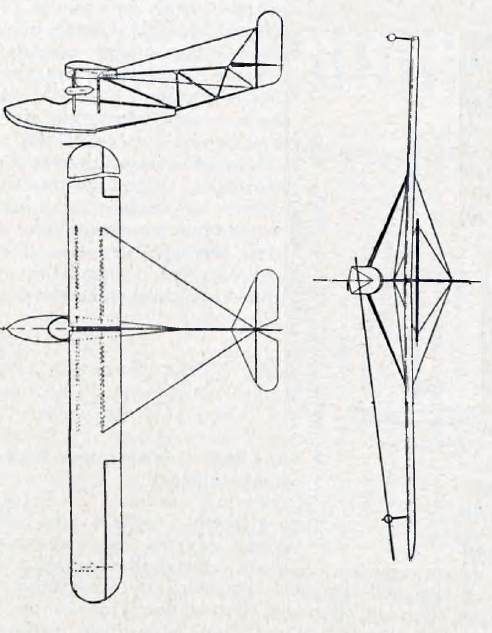
MT 1

Data from J.Cynk, 1971

General characteristics

- Crew: One
- Length: 6.7 m (22 ft 0 in)
- Wingspan: 13.6 m (44 ft 7 in)
- Height: 2.9 m (9 ft 6 in)
- Wing area: 16 m^{2} (170 sq ft)
- Aspect ratio: 10.8
- Airfoil: Warsaw Aerodynamic Institute No.609
- Empty weight: 115 kg (254 lb)
- Gross weight: 190 kg (419 lb)

Performance

- Maximum glide ratio: 14.5
- Rate of sink: 0.92 m/s (181 ft/min)
