= Manuel 1929 Biplane =

British single-seat glider, 1929

Manual Biplane

General information
- Type: Glider
- National origin: UK
- Designer: W. L. Manuel
- Number built: 1

History
- First flight: 18 May 1929

The second Manuel Biplane was a simple biplane glider that was designed and built by Bill (W. L.) Manuel in the UK in the late 1920s. It mostly flew tethered as a kite, in the propwash of a stationary powered aircraft.

== Design and development ==
The very basic Manuel glider was an all wood two bay biplane without stagger, sweep or dihedral. The bays were divided by pairs of parallel interplane struts; the interplane gap was large. The upper and lower wings had the same span and were precisely rectangular in plan, with ailerons on the upper planes. The tail surfaces were carried on a horizontally orientated flat girder formed from two long wooden members joined by four cross struts and diagonal wire bracing. This was fixed to the wing, at mid gap, through another pair of interplane struts and wire braced from the wings against vertical deflections. The horizontal tail was all-moving and a rhomboidal rudder was attached to a slender triangular fin. The pilot sat, exposed, ahead of the lower wing on a short platform with the same width as the fuselage girder and extending a little behind the trailing edge.

The first flight was at RAF Hawkinge in Kent, where Corporal Manuel was stationed, on 5 May 1929. In later tests the Biplane was tethered on a 20 ft (6.1 m) rope to a Gloster Grebe and flown in its propwash for a few minutes before the Grebe's Armstrong Siddeley Jaguar engine began to overheat. The Biplane was eventually destroyed in these experiments.

== Specifications ==
Data from British Gliders and Sailplanes 1971 p.141

General characteristics

- Crew: 1
- Length: 14 ft 5 in (4.39 m)
- Wingspan: 22 ft 0 in (6.71 m)
- Wing area: 160 sq ft (15 m^{2})
- Aspect ratio: 5.5
