= Marske Monarch =

American glider

Monarch
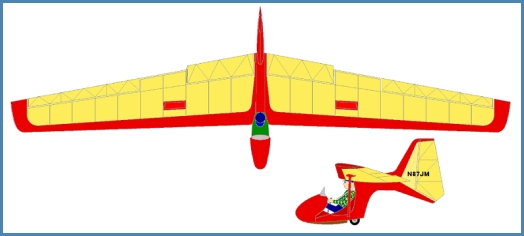

General information
- Type: Glider & Motor glider
- National origin: United States
- Manufacturer: Marske Aircraft Corporation
- Designer: Jim Marske

History
- Introduction date: 1974
- First flight: 1974

The Marske Monarch is a single-seat, high-wing, strut-braced, tailless ultralight glider and motor glider that was offered both as plans and a kit for amateur construction by Marske Aircraft.

== Design and development ==
The Monarch first flew in 1974 and was designed to be both a powered self-launching sailplane and also a pure glider, depending on whether an engine was fitted. The glider version is suitable for car-tow or winch-launching.

The aircraft is built from fiberglass and epoxy laminates. The wing uses a D-cell leading edge. The optional engine can be mounted to the upright behind the pilot in pusher configuration, with the fuel tanks located in the leading edge D-cell. The original powerplant produced 12 hp (9 kW), but engines up to 24 hp (18 kW) can be fitted. When the lower-powered engine is installed the wing is relocated forward to maintain center of gravity. With the larger engine the wing is moved aft. The standard control stick is mounted from above, simplifying control runs to the high wing. The aircraft was proof tested to 9 g.

The Monarch has had several modifications designed for it, including mounting a conventional floor-mounted control stick. Other modifications include larger ailerons and rudder to improve the low-speed handling characteristics.

== Variants ==
Monarch A
Monarch B
Monarch C
Monarch D
Longer span ailerons
Monarch E
Relocated spoilers and a larger rudder
Monarch G
Improved model

== Specifications (Monarch C, D and E) ==
Data from Sailplane Directory, Soaring and Jane's All the World's Aircraft 1988-89

General characteristics

- Crew: one
- Length: 12 ft 2 in (3.71 m)
- Wingspan: 42 ft 0 in (12.80 m)
- Height: 7 ft 10 in (2.39 m)
- Wing area: 185 sq ft (17.2 m^{2})
- Aspect ratio: 9.5:1
- Airfoil: NACA 43012A reflexed at 75% chord
- Empty weight: 220 lb (100 kg)
- Gross weight: 450 lb (204 kg)
- Powerplant: 1 × McCulloch single cylinder air-cooled piston engine, 12 hp (8.9 kW)
- Propellers: 2-bladed wooden fixed pitch

Performance

- Never exceed speed: 70 mph (113 km/h, 61 kn) in smooth air
- Max rough air: 80 km/h (43 kn; 50 mph) (inc. aero-tow and winch launch)
- g limits: +5.3 -2.6
- Maximum glide ratio: 19:1
- Best glide speed: 40 mph; 35 kn (64 km/h)
- Rate of sink: 161 ft/min (0.82 m/s) *Minimum sink speed: 30 mph; 26 kn (48 km/h)
- Wing loading: 2.42 lb/sq ft (11.8 kg/m^{2})

== See also ==
- List of gliders

Aircraft of comparable role, configuration, and era

- Haig Minibat
