= Mantelli Fossa MF.1 =

MF-1

General information
- Type: Primary glider
- National origin: Italy
- Manufacturer: Ennio Fossa
- Designer: Adriano Mantelli
- Number built: 1

History
- First flight: 14 August 1934

The Mantelli-Fossa MF-1 was a single-seat primary glider built in Italy in 1934. Only one was constructed.

== Design and development ==
The Mantelli-Fossa MF-1 was designed by Adriano Mantelli, an experienced aircraft modeller. To fund its construction, Mantelli, his cousin Dino Sirocchi and some other aircraft modellers founded a company named SDAM after their senior partners' initials. The MF-1 was built by Ennio Fossa in his family workshop. It was a high-wing monoplane, its wing supported centrally on a fuselage pedestal and braced on each side with a faired V strut from beyond mid-span to the lower fuselage. It was mounted without dihedral and was rectangular in plan apart from cropped aileron tips.

The fuselage, rectangular in cross-section though with a rounded decking, was entirely fabric-covered. There was an open cockpit immediately ahead of the pedestal. Aft of the wing the fuselage tapered to the tail, where a triangular tailplane with rectangular elevators was placed on top of it. The fin was small and triangular and carried a straight-edged balanced rudder which extended down to the keel, operating in an elevator cut-out. The MF-1 landed on a conventional wooden skid fitted with rubber shock absorbers, assisted by a very small tail skid.

Mantelli flew the MF-1 for the first time on 14 August 1934. Later that year he competed in it at Cantù in the Littoriali Contests.

== Specifications ==
Data from Pedrielli (2011) p.193

General characteristics

- Capacity: One
- Length: 5.70 m (18 ft 8 in)
- Wingspan: 11 m (36 ft 1 in)
- Wing area: 16.50 m^{2} (177.6 sq ft)
- Aspect ratio: 7.3
- Empty weight: 95 kg (209 lb)
- Gross weight: 170 kg (375 lb)

Performance

- Maximum glide ratio: estimated 16:1
- Wing loading: 10.30 kg/m^{2} (2.11 lb/sq ft)
