= MSrE M-30 Fergeteg =

Hungarian two seat advanced training glider

M-30 Fergeteg
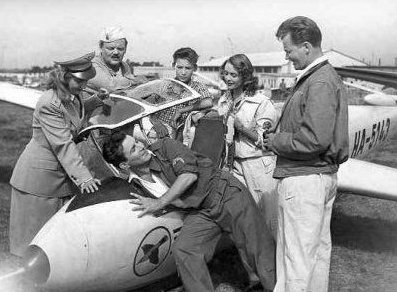

General information
- Type: Two seat advanced training glider
- National origin: Hungary
- Manufacturer: Initially Sirály Aircraft Ltd. then Műegyetemi Sportrepülő Egyesület (MSrE) - (Central Workshop of Hungarian Aeronautical Association), Budaörs.
- Designer: Lajos Beniczky
- Number built: 6, including all variants.

History
- First flight: August 1950

The MSrE M-30 Fergeteg (Storm) was a Hungarian two seat advanced training glider. Originally designed in the early 1940s, its first flight was not made until 1950. Though five variants were developed, only six M-30s were built.

== Design and development ==
Design work on the Fergeteg began at the Aeroclub of the Technical University (MSrE) in 1942. The intention was to produce a high performance glider able to train pilots in advanced soaring techniques and also in aerobatics, with the performance to set two-seat records. Construction in MSrE's workshop began in 1944 but the partially built aircraft was destroyed in the siege of Budapest the following year. The project was revived in 1948 by the Hungarian National Aviation Association (OMRE). Construction was begun by Sirály Aircraft Ltd. and completed in OMRE's shop at Budaörs. It first flew in August 1950. In 1951 the Hungarian Aeronautical Association (MRSz) replaced OMRE, taking over its role.

The M-30 Fergeteg was a wooden aircraft. Its two-piece, mid-set wing was built around single main spars and in plan had rectangular centre sections out to about one third of the span and trapezoidal outer panels with forward swept trailing edges. Ahead of the spar the wing was plywood-covered, forming a torsion resistant D-box. The inner sections were also ply-covered behind the spar and their trailing edges were filled with flaps. The outer panels were fabric-covered and carried split, differential ailerons which reached out to the tips and were interconnected with the flaps. Göppingen type spoilers, mounted behind the spar at the ends of the inner sections, opened both above and below the wing.

The wing of the M-30B was very similar, though the ailerons were narrower and the flaps had been removed. A new riveted aluminium box structure strengthened the wing-fuselage joint. The only change on the M-30C was the return of the M-30's flaps, though with simplified linkage. They were removed again on the M-30C/1 and the ailerons were give Frise-type leading edge balances. The Super Fergeteg's wing had had very slightly forward swept leading edges, one piece ailerons and no flaps.

All Ferteteg variants had a plywood-covered, elliptical cross-section, semi-monocoque tapering fuselage. They differed in the increasing width of their cockpits and the more refined canopies of their enclosed, tandem, dual control cockpits. The high mounting of the horizontal tail on the tall, narrow integral fin also changed with the M-30C, which had a lower tail on a long dorsal step. The M-30C also introduced a broader rudder, otherwise like the curved, deep rudders of the earlier versions which reached down to the keel. All variants had similar horizontal tails, trapezoidal in plan out to rounded tips and with elevators requiring only small cut-outs for rudder movement because of their forward position.

All variants landed on a semi-retractable monowheel under mid-chord with a rubber-sprung skid ahead of it and a small tail skid.

Many of these modifications were triggered by a lack of rear seat headroom in the original. The introduction of a raised canopy induced tailplane vibrations which required further changes. Other persistent problems were high aileron control forces, addressed through linkage changes and aerodynamic balancing, and high rudder control forces, which resulted in the M-30C's larger rudder. In the end, only six Fergetegs were built.

The M-30C/1s, a final, single seat version, was intended to compete in the World Championships held in Leszno in 1954 (not the World Gliding Championships, flown at Camphill that year). It was not a success.

M-30B Fergeteg

== Variants ==
M-30 Fergeteg
Prototype, first flown August 1950. One only.
M-30B Fergeteg
First flown May 1952. One only.
M-30C Fergeteg
First flown May 1953. One only.
M-30C/1 Super Fergeteg
First flown May 1953. Two built.
M-30C/1s Super Fergeteg
Single-seater, first flown February 1954. One only.

== Specifications (M-30B) ==
Data from Gabor, F

General characteristics

- Crew: One
- Length: 7.95 m (26 ft 1 in)
- Wingspan: 18.0 m (59 ft 1 in)
- Wing area: 18.96 m^{2} (204.1 sq ft)
- Aspect ratio: 17.1
- Airfoil: NACA 23012 out to NACA 0009 tips
- Empty weight: 385 kg (849 lb)
- Gross weight: 550 kg (1,213 lb)
- Dihedral: 3°

Performance

- Maximum speed: 250 km/h (160 mph, 130 kn)
- Stall speed: 75 km/h (47 mph, 40 kn)
- Maximum glide ratio: 27 at 97 km/h (60 mph; 52 kn)
- Rate of sink: 0.95 m/s (187 ft/min) minimum, at 85 km/h (53 mph; 46 kn)
