= Kometa-Standard =

General information
- Type: Single seat Standard Class glider
- National origin: Bulgaria
- Designer: L. Panov and D. Panchovsky
- Number built: 31

History
- First flight: 5 August 1960

The Kometa-Standard was a Standard Class glider, designed and built in Bulgaria in the early 1960s. Thirty were flown by local gliding clubs.

== Design and development ==
The Kometa-Standard was the second glider designed by Pavlov and Panchovsky, a fully aerobatic Standard Class aircraft of almost entirely wooden construction, though with fabric covered control surfaces. The wings, straight tapered in plan and set at mid-wing position, were single spar structures with leading edge plywood covered D-boxes. They had 4° of dihedral. There were salmon type fairings, tapering, slender, streamlined bodies, at the tips. The Kometa-Standard had mass-balanced, slotted ailerons and spoilers at 60% chord which opened above and below the wing.

The fuselage of the Kometa-Standard was a plywood covered monocoque with the cockpit extending close to the metal nose cone. The canopy of the prototype was of long bubble form, proud of the rear fuselage line, but this was lowered and reshaped on the production Kometa-Standard II, merging into the rear fuselage from which it was hinged. The cockpit was changed again in the Kometa-Standard III which had a sliding canopy over a reclining seat, making this variant 30 km/h (19 mph) faster than the Kometa-Standard II. Overall, the fuselage tapered uniformly from the cockpit to the tail. The Kometa-Standard had a 110° butterfly tail, its plywood and fabric covered surfaces terminating, like the wings, in little salmon fairings. Its undercarriage was a fixed monowheel, fitted with a brake and assisted by a forward, rubber sprung skid.

== Operational history ==
The prototype was flown for the first time on 5 August 1960 and an initial batch of 10 Kometa-Standard IIs was built, followed by two batches, each of 10, of Kometa-Standard IIIs. Flown by Bulgarian clubs, they were fully aerobatic, though not cleared for cloud flying.

== Variants ==
Data from reference. Numbers from, CD version.

Kometa-Standard
Prototype LZ-901. 1 built.
Kometa-Standard II
Production variant with lowered, rear hinged canopy. 10 built.
Kometa-Standard III
Further revision to nose/canopy lines with reclining seat and sliding canopy. 20 built.

== Specifications (Kometa-Standard II) ==
Data from Gliders and Sailplanes of the World The World's Sailplanes:Die Segelflugzeuge der Welt:Les Planeurs du Monde Volume II

General characteristics

- Crew: One
- Length: 6.95 m (22 ft 10 in)
- Wingspan: 14.95 m (49 ft 1 in)
- Wing area: 12.70 m^{2} (136.7 sq ft)
- Aspect ratio: 17.6
- Airfoil: NACA 43012A
- Empty weight: 240 kg (529 lb)
- Gross weight: 340 kg (750 lb)

Performance

- Never exceed speed: 210 km/h (130 mph, 110 kn)
- Rough air speed max: 150 km/h (93.2 mph; 81.0 kn)
- Aerotow speed: 150 km/h (93.2 mph; 81.0 kn)
- Winch launch speed: 100 km/h (62.1 mph; 54.0 kn)
- Terminal velocity: with full airbrakes 220 km/h (137 mph; 119 kn)
- g limits: +6.25 -3.3 at 220 km/h (136.7 mph; 118.8 kn)
- Maximum glide ratio: 28:1 at 82 km/h (51.0 mph; 44.3 kn)
- Rate of sink: 0.78 m/s (154 ft/min) at 78 km/h (48.5 mph; 42.1 kn)
- Wing loading: 26.70 kg/m^{2} (5.47 lb/sq ft)
