= Marske XM-1 =

American glider

XM-1
- The XM-1 in its original configuration with tip rudders

General information
- Type: Glider
- National origin: United States
- Designer: Jim Marske
- Status: Sole example no longer on FAA registry
- Number built: one

History
- First flight: 1957

The Marske XM-1 was an American mid-wing, single-seat, experimental tailless glider that was designed and built by Jim Marske in 1957.

Experimentation with the XM-1 led to the final configuration of the later Marske Pioneer.

== Design and development ==
The first of Marske's flying wings was the XM-1, a design inspired by the flying wing designs of Charles Fauvel and Al Backstrom. He built the XM-1 when he was 19 years old. The aircraft went through several versions, each a modification of the same basic airframe as Marske experimented with configurations. The aircraft started off with fins on the wing tips and was later converted to a single fin at the rear of the short fuselage in its "XM-1D" configuration.

The XM-1 was built with a welded steel tube fuselage covered in fiberglass. The 40 ft (12.2 m) wing was fabricated from wood and covered with doped aircraft fabric. The wing employed a 14% Fauvel airfoil. The landing gear was a fixed monowheel.

Only one XM-1 was built. It was registered with the US Federal Aviation Administration in the Experimental - Amateur-built category.

== Operational history ==
The XM-1 was described by Soaring Magazine as "easy to fly". The aircraft was stall and spin proof. Marske sold the aircraft and it went through a series of owners. The XM-1 was later removed from the FAA register and likely no longer exists.

== Variants ==
The XM-1 in its "D" configuration with the single central fin and rudder

XM-1-A
Initial configuration with wing tip fins and rudders.
XM-1-B
with minor improvements over the XM-1-A
XM-1-C
Modified with a central fin only.
XM-1D
Final configuration with a central fin and rudder.

== Specifications (XM-1B) ==
Data from The World's Sailplanes:Die Segelflugzeuge der Welt:Les Planeurs du Monde Volume II

General characteristics

- Crew: one
- Length: 8 ft 2 in (2.48 m)
- Wingspan: 38 ft 1 in (11.6 m)
- Height: 3 ft 10 in (1.16 m) at cockpit
- Wing area: 160 sq ft (15 m^{2})
- Aspect ratio: 9
- Airfoil: 14% Fauvel
- Empty weight: 311 lb (141 kg)
- Gross weight: 551 lb (250 kg)

Performance

- Never exceed speed: 140 mph (226 km/h, 122 kn)
- Aerotow speed: 104.5 mph (90.8 kn; 168.2 km/h)
- Winch launch speed: 105 km/h (65.2 mph; 56.7 kn)
- g limits: +4 -3 at 65.25 mph (56.7 kn; 105.0 km/h)
- Maximum glide ratio: 24:1 at 51 mph (44.3 kn; 82.1 km/h)
- Rate of sink: 175 ft/min (0.89 m/s) at 39.8 mph (34.6 kn; 64.1 km/h)
- Wing loading: 3.4 lb/sq ft (16.7 kg/m^{2})

== See also ==
Related lists

- List of gliders
