= Jancsó-Szokolay M22 =

Hungarian single-seat sailplane

General information
- Type: High performance sailplane
- National origin: Poland
- Manufacturer: MrSE workshop and elsewhere
- Designer: Endre Jancsó and András Szokolay
- Number built: 20

History
- First flight: 1 September 1937
- Retired: 1952-3

The Jancsó-Szokolay M22 was a Hungarian single-seat sailplane first flown in 1937. Twenty were built and the type set several national records. Some remained in service up to about 1953.

== Design and development ==
In the mid-1930s the MSrE (Műegyetemi Sportrepülő Egyesület) or Aero Club of the Technical University decided to build a sailplane capable of thermal, cross country flights. They began to build a Rhönbussard but Erno Rubik encouraged Endre Jancsó and András Szokolay to design a new, Hungarian aircraft incorporating the Rhönbussard parts already completed. The result was the M22 which flew for the first time on 1 September 1937.

The two-part gull wing of the M22 was mounted at mid-fuselage. The central panels were rectangular in plan, occupied about 35% of the span and had 8° of dihedral. The outer panels were trapezoidal apart from rounded tips and had no dihedral. Both panels shared a single spar which, with plywood skinning forward of it around the leading edge, formed a torsion-resistant D-box. The half-wings were joined together within the fuselage. Near the fuselage the plywood extended rearwards to an angled drag strut. The rest of the wing surface was fabric covered. Parallel chord ailerons, mounted on a light false spar, filled the whole trailing edges of the tapered outer parts and could be lowered together as camber-changing flaps. Early examples of the M22 had no air brakes but later Göppingen type brakes, mounted on the rear of the main spar at the start of the drag strut, deployed above and below the wing.

The sailplane had an roughly oval section, ply-covered fuselage, though the sides met at a sharp, linear keel. A rubber-sprung landing skid covered the join from nose to under mid-chord. Its cockpit was at the leading edge and usually enclosed with a canopy modified over the years by the M22's various manufacturers. The fuselage tapered rearwards; the tailplane and elevators together, mounted on top of the fuselage, were straight-tapered out to tapered tips and fabric-covered apart from ply-skinned leading edges. A small, short, ply-covered fin served as a rudder post for the balanced rudder, which was large, curving and with a slightly pointed tip. It was usually fabric-covered, though some manufactured by Aero Ever Ltd. in 1943 were ply-covered.

The M22 was fully aerobatic.

== Operational history ==
Three M22s were built by MSrE, ten more by Aero Ever Ltd and another four by the Aircraft Factory of Transylvania. Three more were built at other aeroclubs.

The first example was bought by the Aero Club of Egypt. In 1938 visiting RAF Squadron Leader Edward Mole was impressed by its qualities and, after a tow by an Avro Tutor, performed a double bunt or outside loop in it.

The M22 set several Hungarian glider records. These included a distance record of 356 km (221 mi; 192 nmi) in 1942 and the greatest height gain 3,845 m (12,615 ft) in the same year. In 1949 an M22 set a national record of for speed around a 100 km (62 mi; 54 nmi) triangular course of 33.4 km/h (20.8 mph; 18.0 kn).

The remaining M22s were retired in 1952-3.

== Specifications ==
Data from M-22, Hungarian gliders 1933-2000, F Gabor

General characteristics

- Crew: One
- Length: 5.8 m (19 ft 0 in)
- Wingspan: 15 m (49 ft 3 in)
- Wing area: 16.55 m^{2} (178.1 sq ft)
- Aspect ratio: 13.55
- Airfoil: Göttingen Gö 535 out to NACA 99 tip
- Empty weight: 180 kg (397 lb)
- Gross weight: 265 kg (584 lb)

Performance

- Maximum speed: 260 km/h (160 mph, 140 kn) VNE
- Stall speed: 55 km/h (34 mph, 30 kn)
- Maximum glide ratio: 22 at 67 km/h (42 mph; 36 kn)
- Rate of sink: 0.8 m/s (160 ft/min) minimum, at 60 km/h (37 mph; 32 kn)
- Maximum aerotow speed: 120 km/h (75 mph; 65 kn)
