= Musger Mg 9 =

Tandem two seat glider built in Austria

Mg 9

General information
- Type: Training and performance glider
- National origin: Austria
- Designer: Erwin Musger
- Number built: More than 11

History
- First flight: c.1935

The Musger Mg 9 was a tandem two seat glider built in Austria in the mid-1930s. It broke both world and national records.

== Design and development ==
The Mg-9 was a glider designed as a high performance and training aircraft with aerobatic capabilities. Like most gliders of its day, it was wood framed with a mixture of plywood and fabric covering. It had a high gull wing built around a single spar, with ply covering ahead of it around the leading edge forming a torsion resistant D-box. The centre section was rectangular in plan, with ply covering extending rearwards to a diagonal drag strut. This inner section had modest dihedral, about 3°. Behind main and drag struts the wing was fabric covered. Outboard the straight leading edge had slight sweep on it, and the trailing edge curved in to elliptical tips. One of the changes made between the prototype Mg 9 and the production Mg 9a was a reduction of aileron chord, though on both versions these extended over the whole of the tapered our panels. The wing was supported over the fuselage by a ply covered pylon which contained the rear cockpit. The prototype had a single, faired lift strut between the spar and the lower fuselage but production aircraft replaced this with an unusual inverted V pair of thin struts on each side, partly to ease the introduction of a monowheel between its fuselage connections.

The fuselage of the Mg 9 was entirely ply covered and, pylon apart, had an ovoid cross-section. The forward cockpit, ahead of the wing, was enclosed by a complicated, multi-framed, flat panelled canopy. On the Mg 9a the forward fuselage was deepened, allowing the cockpit roof line, the seats and the pylon to be lowered; the glazing was also simplified. The view from the rear seat was greatly limited by the overhead wing though windows, less deep on the Mg 9a, provided sideways vision and the seat was raised to improve the forward view. Behind the trailing edge the pylon fell rapidly away to a slightly tapering fuselage. The horizontal tail, almost entirely fabric covered, was mounted on top of the fuselage; its straight, slightly swept tailplane carried full, semi-elliptical elevators. Their hinge line was close to the root of the ply covered fin, placing the full, D-shaped, fabric covered balanced rudder largely behind them. There was a small, ply covered tail bumper protecting the base of the rudder; on the prototype the main undercarriage was a skid that extended from the nose to behind the rear cockpit but on production models this ended further forward, under the wing spar, with the monowheel immediately aft.

The first prototype flew in either 1935 or 1936, with ten Mg 9a produced in a run followed by a few later examples.

== Operational history ==
Toni Kahlbacher, with different co-pilots, twice increased the world two seat glider endurance record in 1938 in a Mg 9a; the second flight, flown from 8 to 10 September with Josef Führinger, lasted for 40 hours and 51 minutes. He also set several new Austrian gliding records with it.

Kahlbacher and Tauschegg, the other pilot on the first record duration flight, flew a Mg 9a at the Rhön (Wasserkuppe) Contest of 1938. They gained third place in the two seater class.

== Variants ==
Mg 9
Prototype, one only.
Mg 9a
Deepened forward fuselage, lowered pylon. Revised canopy, wing struts and ailerons. Landing wheel. Ten were produced in one run, plus some later examples.

== Specifications (Mg 9a) ==
Data from Sailplanes 1920-1939

General characteristics

- Crew: Two
- Length: 7.35 m (24 ft 1 in)
- Wingspan: 17.75 m (58 ft 3 in)
- Wing area: 20.7 m^{2} (223 sq ft)
- Aspect ratio: 14.6
- Airfoil: Göttingen 535
- Empty weight: 265 kg (584 lb)
- Gross weight: 415 kg (915 lb)
- Wing loading:19.8 kg/m^{2} (4.06 lb/sqft)

Performance

- Maximum glide ratio: 23
- Rate of sink: 0.73 m/s (144 ft/min) minimum, at 72 km/h (45 mph)
