= MRSz Z-03 Ifjúság =

Hungarian advanced training glider

Z-03 Ifjúság
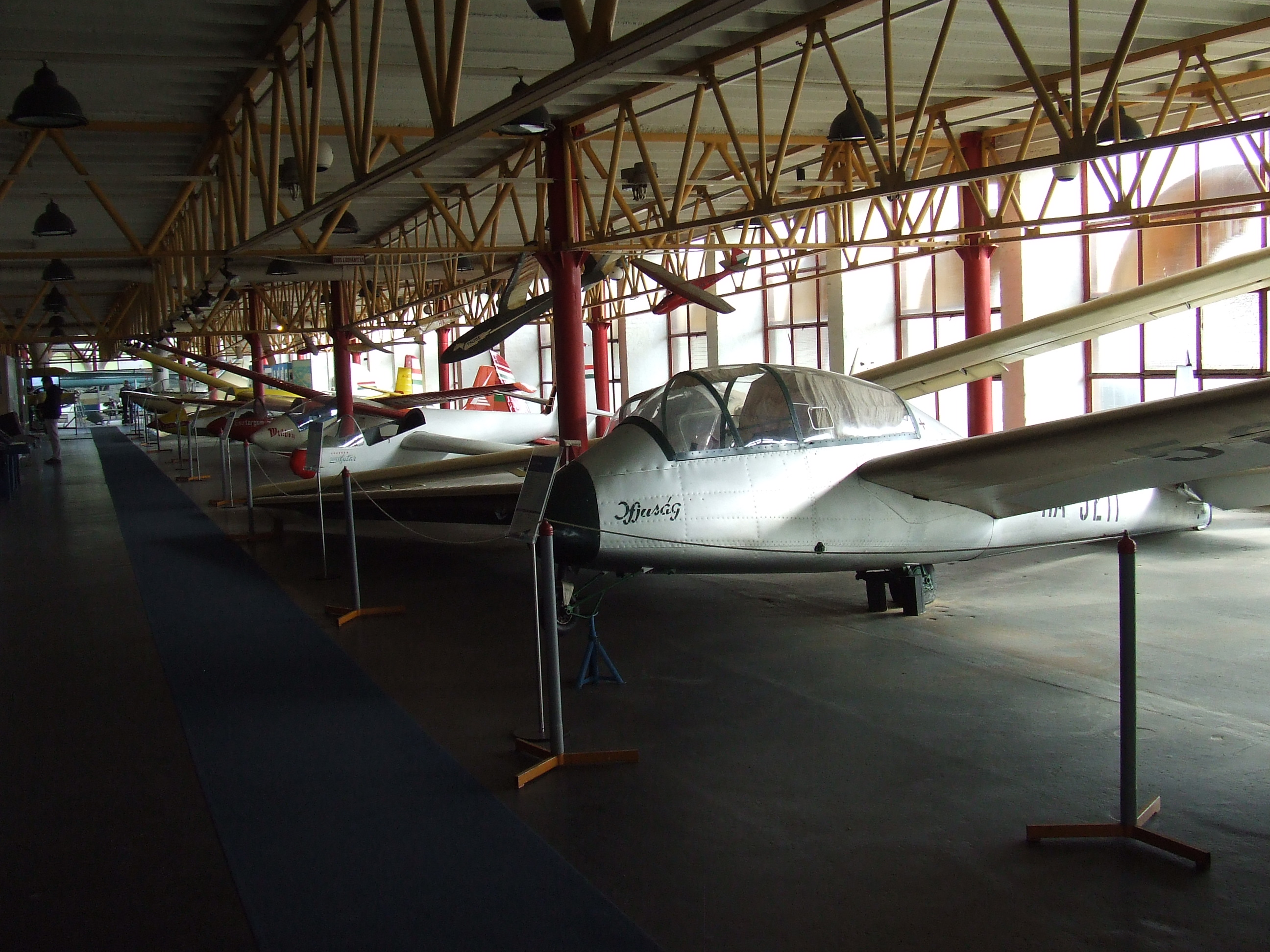
- Z-03B in Kőzlekedési Muzeum, Budapest.

General information
- Type: Two seat advanced training glider
- National origin: Hungary
- Manufacturer: Central Workshop of the Hungarian Aeronautical Association (MRSz - Magyar Repülési Szövetség Központi Műhelye), Dunakeszi.
- Designer: Ferenc Zsebő
- Number built: 65

History
- First flight: February 1953

The MRSz Z-03A Ifjúság (Youth) was a Hungarian advanced training glider built in the 1950s, capable of both aerobatic and, with the revised Z-03B, blind flying instruction. They were removed from service in 1960 after fatigue analysis revealed that the fuselage structure at the wing attachment point had only a short life.

== Design and development ==
In 1948 Hungarian National Flying Association (OMRE), which in 1951 became the Hungarian Aeronautical Association (MRSz), invited tenders for a two seat primary glider. The Z-03 Ifjúság won the contract for 100 aircraft, with a design by Ferenc Zsebő capable of exploiting thermals and performing basic aerobatics. Its first flight was in February 1953. There were two production variants, the Z-03A and the Z-03B.

The Z-03 had a wooden, single spar mid-mounted wing which was trapezoidal in plan, with plywood covering ahead of the spar forming a torsion resistant D-box, and with fabric covering aft. On the Z-03A, the inner halves of the trailing edges were occupied by split flaps and the rest with Frise-balanced ailerons. Just inboard of the ailerons Göppingen-type spoilers, mounted aft of the spar at 40% chord, opened both above and below the wing. The Z-03B had no flaps.

Structurally, the fuselage of both Z-03 variants was all-metal and built in two distinct halves. The differences were in the forward parts which stretched from nose to wing trailing edge. The forward part of the Z-03A's fuselage was a welded steel-tube structure with light alloy formers to shape the fabric covering. Its cockpit held two seats in tandem. The forward position was provided with instruments and the rear seat was over the c.g., so the aircraft could be flown solo from the front with or without a rear-seat occupant. The two seats were covered by a one-piece, rear-hinged canopy. The Z-03A's landing gear had an exposed, rubber sprung nosewheel and a semi-exposed mainwheel under mid-chord.

The Z-03B had a new forward fuselage, 600 mm (2 ft 0 in) longer and 60 mm (2.4 in) wider and of light alloy monocoque structure. The roomier cockpit had a lower, side-opening canopy, lengthened at the back and the rear seat was instrumented, opening the possibility of blind-flying training. The landing gear of the Z-03B was similar to that of the earlier variant but the mainwheel had been moved aft to the trailing edge and was rubber sprung. Both variants could be winch-launched using a pair of nose hooks connected to Y-ended cables.

The rear fuselage of both variants was a light-alloy monocoque, with formers and longerons giving it an elliptical section. Four pins joined it to the forward section. The tail units were also the same on both models. All had light-alloy structures and all fixed surfaces were light-alloy skinned. The control surfaces were fabric-covered. The Ifjúság's horizontal tail was trapezoidal in plan as was the fin, though it had a very low forward extension on which the tailplane was mounted. The profile of the broad, unbalanced rudder was also angular and extended down to the keel. The rudder profiles of the two variants were a little different in that the bottom edge of the Z-03As rudder swept up significantly rearwards.

The prototype Z-03 was exhibited at the Leipzig Fair in 1955.

== Operational history ==
The first of 32 production Z-03s first flew in January, 1955. Two of them were exported to Belgium. The glider performed well in distance, speed and height-gain flights and in August 1955 the first pilot went solo in one. However, later that year a serious structural weakness was revealed during an aerobatic flight, when the wing-fuselage connection failed. Fortunately, its two occupants escaped by parachute. Subsequent fatigue tests, concluded in 1960, showed the problem was fatigue failure in the steel fuselage structure after only 275 hours, rather than the joint or the wing. As a result, the Z-03 was withdrawn from service.

The Z-03B Ifjúság, with its more comfortable, roomier and blind flying equipped cockpit, first flew in May 1956. During a demonstration flight the first example was over-stressed. Minor modifications were made and 32 were built, one of them exported to Austria. Without the flaps of the Z-03A and 35 kg (77 lb) heavier, the Z-03B was not an easy aircraft for students to land gently. Several were damaged in heavy landings.

Like the Z-03As, all Z-04Bs were withdrawn from use in 1960 after the fatigue tests.

== Variants ==
Z-03A Ifjúság

Z-03
Prototype, first flown February 1953. One built.
Z-03A
First production series, first flown in January 1956. 32 built but removed from service in 1960.
Z-03B
Second production series, first flown in May 1956. longer, wider cockpit with both positions instrumented. 32 built but removed from service in 1960.

== Aircraft on display ==
- Z-03B Ifjúság (HA-5211), Hungarian Technical and Transportation Museum

== Specifications (Z-03B) ==
Data from Gabor, F

General characteristics

- Crew: Pupil and instructor in tandem.
- Length: 8.1 m (26 ft 7 in)
- Wingspan: 15 m (49 ft 3 in)
- Wing area: 18.4 m^{2} (198 sq ft)
- Aspect ratio: 12.2
- Airfoil: Göttingen Gö-549
- Empty weight: 350 kg (772 lb)
- Gross weight: 520 kg (1,146 lb)
- Dihedral: 3.5°

Performance

- Maximum speed: 220 km/h (140 mph, 120 kn) Never exceed
- Stall speed: 67 km/h (42 mph, 36 kn)
- Maximum glide ratio: 22 at 84 km/h (52 mph; 45 kn)
- Rate of sink: 1.0 m/s (200 ft/min) at 71 km/h (44 mph; 38 kn)
- maximum speed in rough air; 130 km/h (81 mph; 70 kn)
