= Adriano Mantelli =

Italian aircraft designer

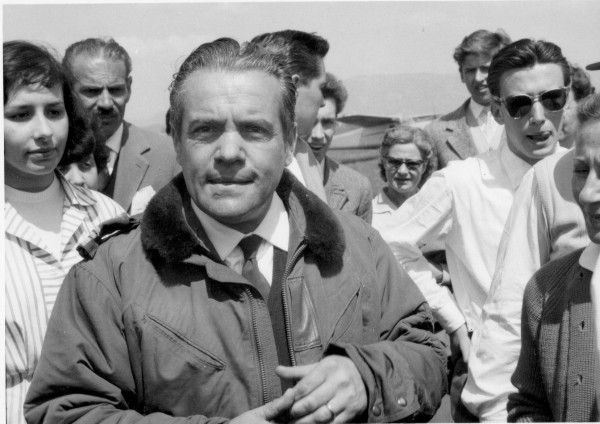
- Born: Sottotenente Adriano Mantelli; 13 February 1913; Cortile San Marino
- Died: 6 May 1995 (aged 82); Florence, Italy
- Education: Regio Istituto d'Arte Paolo Toschi, Parma
- Known for: Aircraft Design

Adriano Mantelli (13 February 1913 – 6 May 1995) was an Italian aircraft designer who designed the Alaparma Baldo.

== Early life ==
In 1929 Mantelli competed in flying competitions with aircraft that were self designed and built. In 1931 he started designing gliders.

In the summer of 1936, Adriano Mantelli was the leading Italian fighter pilot in the Spanish Civil War serving in the Regia Aeronautica. Mantelli shot down a Dewoitine piloted by British pilot Edward Hillman. Flying under the alias "Arrighi", he achieved fifteen victories.

In 1945 Mantelli designed the AM-6 twin boomed pusher aircraft derived from previous glider designs. Mantelli co-founded the company Alaparma with Livio Agostini to produce the AM-6, and later the AM-8 and AM-10 aircraft.

In 1951 Mantelli designed and built two gliders, the AM-10 and AM-12 "Albatross", in Buenos Aires, Argentina In 1954, Mantelli set an Italian record for altitude in a glider in a two-seat CVV-6 Canguro glider.

Mantelli received the FAI Louis Blériot Medal in 1962, and 1964. Mantelli reached the rank of General.

He died in 1995 while waiting for a train at Firenze Santa Maria Novella railway station.
