= LAK Genesis 2 =

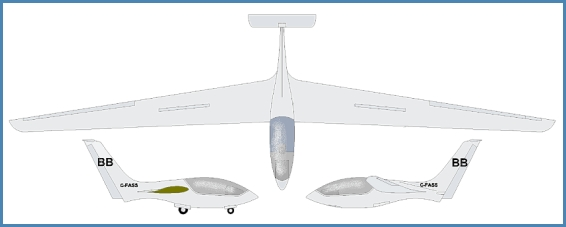

General information
- Type: Standard Class sailplane
- National origin: Lithuania
- Manufacturer: Sportinė Aviacija (LAK)
- Designer: Jim Marske and John Roncz
- Number built: 27

History
- First flight: 1994

The Genesis 2 is a Standard Class competition glider that was designed by an American team led by Jerry Mercer. It was produced in Lithuania. It is notable in having almost no rear fuselage. However it is not tailless, because it has a small, all-moving tailplane on top of the vertical stabilizer. The tailplane is mainly a trimmer, rather than for longitudinal stability.

== Development ==
During development it was found that carbon rods formed by the "pultrusion" process could be used to provide a stronger spar. This technique has subsequently been applied to other LAK aircraft. The nosewheel was also made retractable and the wing washout was reduced. The production aircraft with these modifications, which flew in 1998, were called "Genesis 2". There was a breakdown in relations between the American design group and the manufacturers, and so production was stopped after 27 had been made.

== Specifications (Genesis 2) ==
Data from Activate Media (2006). "Genesis 1 and 2 Group Genesis". Archived from the original on 29 August 2012.

General characteristics

- Crew: one
- Length: 4.828 m (15 ft 10 in)
- Wingspan: 15 m (49 ft 3 in)
- Height: 2.21 m (7 ft 3 in)
- Wing area: 11.25 m^{2} (121 sq ft)
- Aspect ratio: 20.2
- Empty weight: 240 kg (530 lb)
- Gross weight: 525 kg (1,157 lb)

Performance

- Maximum speed: 276 km/h (171.5 mph, 149.0 kn)
- Stall speed: 75 km/h (46.6 mph, 40.5 kn)
- g limits: +5.55/-3.55
- Maximum glide ratio: 44
- Rate of sink: 0.58 m/s (114 ft/min)
