= Magni =

Magni is both a surname and a given name. Notable people with the name include:

Surname:

- Arturo Magni (1925–2015), Italian engineer and entrepreneur
- Caterina Magni (born 1966), Italian-born French archaeologist and anthropologist
- Cesare Magni (c.1495–1534), Italian painter
- Claude Magni (born 1950), French cyclist
- Eva Magni (1909–2005), Italian stage and film actress
- Fabio Magni (born 1967), Italian equestrian
- Fiorenzo Magni (1920–2012), Italian bicycle racer
- Gabriele Magni (born 1973), Italian fencer
- Giovanni Battista Magni (1592–1674), also known as Il Modenino, Italian painter, active in Rome
- Giovanni Pietro Magni (1655 - 1722/1724), German stuccoist born in Switzerland
- Lodovico Magni (1618–1680), Roman Catholic prelate
- Luigi Magni (1928–2013), Italian screenwriter
- Marcello Magni (1959–2022), Italian actor and theatre director
- Nicholas Magni (c.1355–1435), Silesian theologian
- Oreste Magni (1936-1975), Italian racing cyclist
- Piero Magni (1898-1988), Italian aeronautical engineer
- Pietro Magni (disambiguation), various people
- Riccardo Magni (born 1976), Italian wrestler
- Secondo Magni (1912-1997), Italian racing cyclist

Given name:

- Magni Ásgeirsson (born 1978), Icelandic singer/musician and a contestant in the CBS show Rock Star: Supernova
- Magni Wentzel (born 1945), Norwegian jazz musician

Other uses:

- Magni (character), a Marvel Comics character
- Móði and Magni, the sons of Thor and Jarnsaxa in Norse mythology

== See also ==
- 9670 Magni, an asteroid
- Cattaneo Magni RR, a 1930s rocket-powered aircraft
- Magni Grenivík, an Icelandic football team
- Magnicharters, an airline company based in Mexico City
- Magni Gyro, Italian manufacturer of autogyros:

- Magni M-14 Scout
- Magni M-16 Tandem Trainer
- Magni M-18 Spartan
- Magni M-24 Orion

- Magni Vale, an Italian civil monoplane
- Magni Vittoria, Italian experimental, single seat, parasol wing aircraft
- Magnis (disambiguation)
