= Magan =

Magan may refer to:

== Places ==
- Magan (civilization)
- Magan, Russia
- Magan Airport
- Magán, Spain
- Magan, alternative name of Mahin, a village in Iran
- Aman Magan, a village in Iran

== People ==
- Magan (name)

== Music ==
- Juan Magan (born 1978), Spanish producer, singer, remixer and DJ of electronic music
  - Magan & Rodriguez, Spanish producing / singing duo made up of Juan Magan and Marcos Rodriguez
