= Magna =

Magna is an inflected form of the Latin word magnus, 'great, large, vast, big, mighty', with cognates throughout the Indo-European languages, including English many and mega (the latter a doublet via Ancient Greek μέγας (mégas)). It appears in many names and titles, including:

== Companies ==
- Magna (bicycle company), bicycle brand of Dynacraft BSC
- Magna Corporation, defunct American public company
- Magna Entertainment Corp., North American gaming and horse racing company
- Magna Home Entertainment, Australian entertainment distributor also known as Magna Pacific
- Magna International, Canadian automotive supplier
- Magna Publishing Group, American publisher of pornography
- Magna Steyr, automobile manufacturer in Graz, Austria

== Ancient Rome ==
- Magna Graecia, ancient Roman name for the areas of Southern Italy where Greek was widely spoken
- Magnis (Carvoran), a now ruined Roman fort, also known as Magna, at Carvoran, Northumberland, England
- Leptis Magna, ancient Roman city in Libya
- Plancia Magna (fl. 1st century CE), prominent woman from Anatolia during the Roman Empire

== People ==
- Edith Scott Magna (1885–1960), American civic leader
- Marcus Magna (born 1988), French professional footballer

== Vehicles ==
- Honda Magna, cruiser motorcycle produced from 1982 to 1988 and 1994 to 2003
- Mitsubishi Magna, mid-size car produced from 1985 to 2005

== Other ==
- Magna cum laude, indicating that an academic degree was earned 'with great praise'
- Magna Defender, character from the Power Rangers Lost Galaxy TV series
- Magna (moth), genus of moths in the family Erebidae
- Magna (paint), brand name of an acrylic resin paint formerly sold by Bocour Artist Colors
- Magna Science Adventure Centre, educational visitor attraction in Rotherham, England
  - Magna station, a stop on the South Yorkshire Supertram serving the site
- Magna Special Craft, a brand of beer brewed by Compañía Cervecera de Puerto Rico
- Magna (The Walking Dead), a fictional character from The Walking Dead
- Magna, Utah, city in Salt Lake County, Utah
- MAGNA awards, Australian museum awards
- Magna (Neom), A city in Neom project, Saudi Arabia.
- Magna Via (route)

== See also ==
- Magnum (disambiguation)
- Magnus (disambiguation)
- Magnis (disambiguation)
- Magna Carta (disambiguation)
- Manga (disambiguation)
- Maga (disambiguation)
- Magan (disambiguation)
