= George Magan =

George Magan may refer to:

- George Magan, Baron Magan of Castletown (born 1945), Conservative member of the House of Lords
- George Magan (Gaelic footballer) (1894–?), Irish Gaelic footballer
