= Magan (name) =

Magan is a surname with Indian or Irish origins. The Irish surname originated in County Leitrim, Ireland. Magan (मगन Hindi, मग्न Sanskrit) meaning sunk, or colloquially tipsy, is a surname common in the Hindi Belt.

== Notable people with this name include ==
Given name

- Magan Singh Rajvi, Indian football (soccer) player

Middle name

- Hirsi Magan Isse (1935—2008), scholar and a leading figures of the Somali revolution
- Kaya Magan Cissé (c. 350), Soninke king of Wagadou

Surname

- Alexander Magan (born 1993), Dutch Curler
- Francis Magan, (1774–1843) member of the Society of United Irishmen, barrister and informer
- George Magan, Baron Magan of Castletown (born 1945), Conservative member of the House of Lords in the UK
- George Magan (1894–?), Irish Gaelic footballer
- Manchán Magan (1970–2025), Irish writer, traveller and television maker
- Percy Tilson Magan (1867–1947), Irish-American educator
- Ruán Magan (born 1968), Irish director of documentaries and drama-documentaries
- Tony Magan (1911–1981), Irish republican and a chief of staff of the Irish Republican Army
- Juan Magán (born 1978), Spanish producer, singer, remixer and DJ (Magán & Rodríguez)
