= Magni M-24 Orion =

Italian autogyro

M-24 Orion
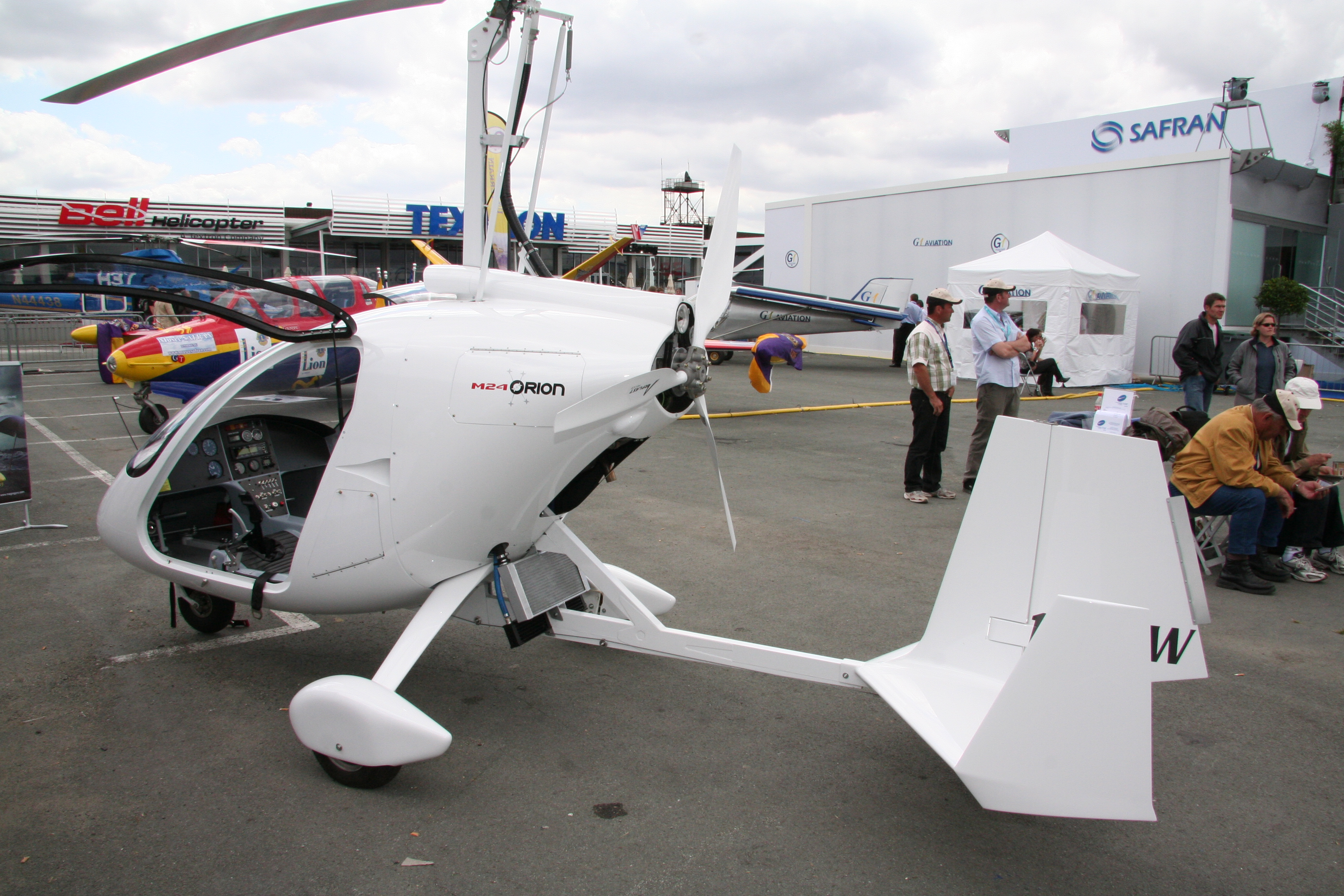

General information
- Type: Two seat autogyro
- National origin: Italy
- Manufacturer: Magni Gyro srl, Besnate
- Status: in production
- Number built: >300

History
- First flight: 2008
- Developed from: XM-23 Orion

The Magni M-24 Orion is an Italian sport autogyro, seating two side-by-side in an enclosed cabin. It was designed and produced by Magni Gyro srl of Besnate.

== Design and development ==
Magni Gyro currently produces five sport autogyro models, all with similar pod and low boom, pusher engine layouts and the M-24 Orion have side by side seating and an enclosed cabin. It has a steel airframe with a carbon fibre cabin and engine-enclosing pod. Transparent, top hinged doors on either side give access to the two seats, which are slightly staggered to make the most of the cabin width. The 2-bladed rotor, mounted on a mast above the pod, is of composite construction.

An 85 kW (114 hp) Rotax 914ULS flat four engine is mounted at cabin-top height and drives a 3-bladed pusher propeller. Below it, the slender flat-sided boom carries the fibreglass empennage, which consists of a swept horizontal stabilizer with end-plate fins and a larger, central, fin and rudder. The Orion has a tricycle undercarriage with the faired mainwheels, fitted with brakes, on spring cantilever legs. The nosewheel is unfaired.

The Orion's immediate precursor is the XM-23 Orion, which first flew on 1 February 2007, but both share many components with the tandem, open cockpit M-16 and M-22.

== Operational history ==
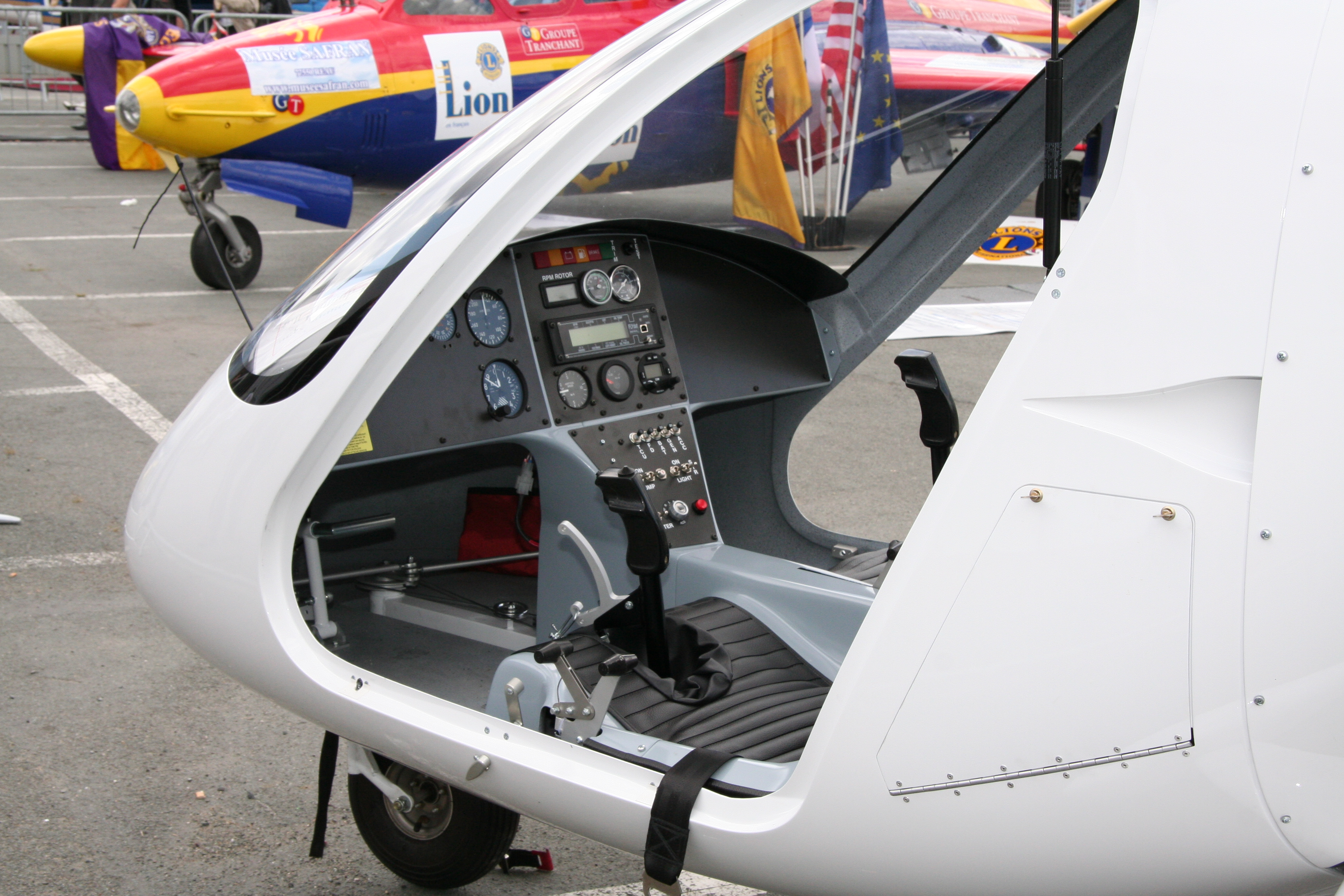
M-24 Orion at le Bourget, 2009

The Orion was first seen in public in August 2008 and a pre-production run of 10 aircraft was initiated that autumn, with full-scale production starting in 2009.

By mid-2010 there were 11 Orions on the mainland European (Russian excluded) registers, the majority in France. UK type approval was reached in 2010, 4 aircraft are currently (November 2010) on the UK register, and at least one on the Canadian register.

== Operators ==
Belarus

ЦСП Центр специальной подготовки (STC special training center) – at least one labeled EW-458SL Training of special forces and counterterrorism.

== Variants ==
M-16 Tandem Trainer
tandem open two seat autogyro
M-22 Voyager
touring version of the M-16
M-23 Orion
one-off enclosed side-by-side development of the M-16 series

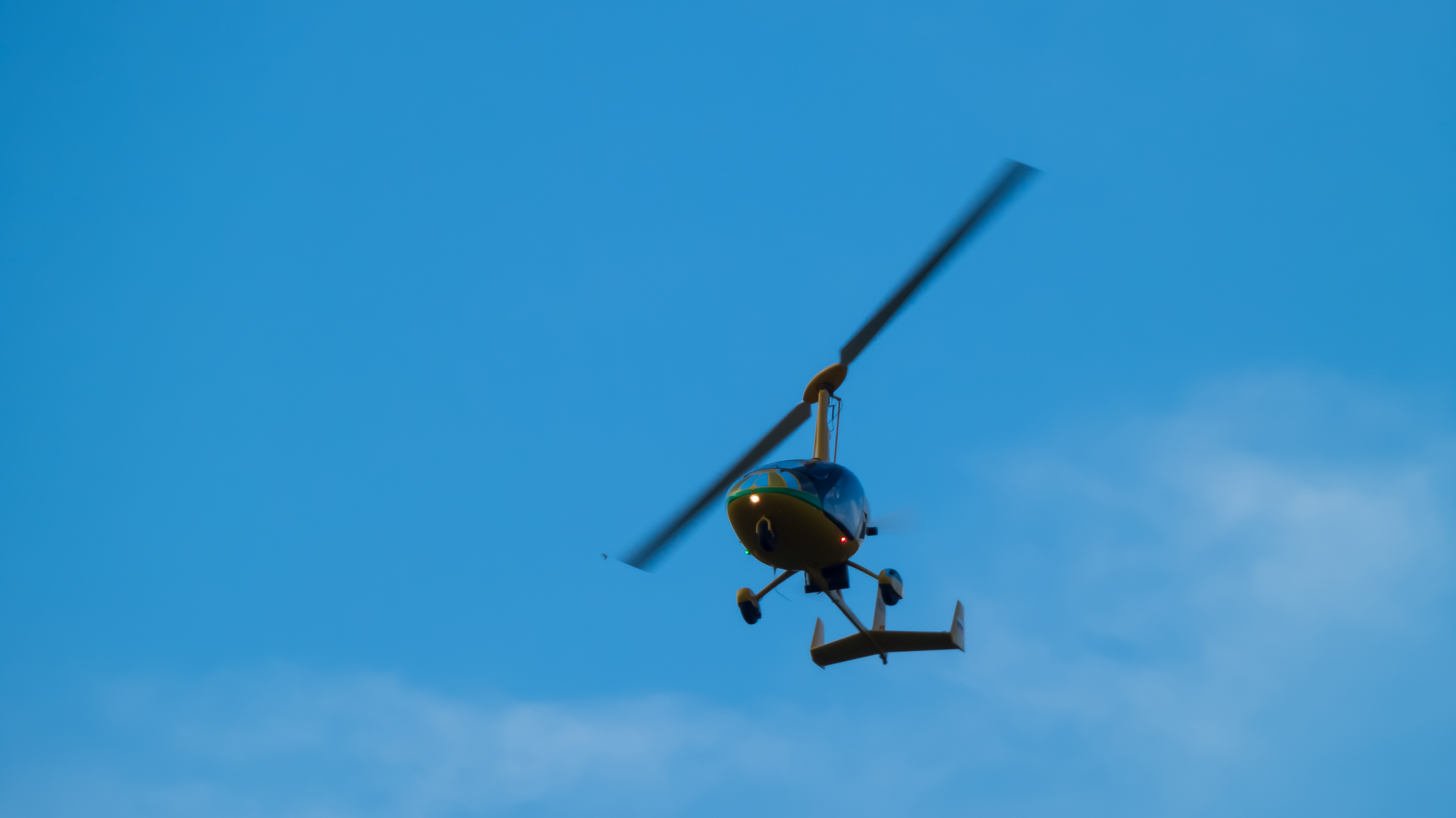
M-24 on 'Sky: Theory and Practice 2022' festival

M-24 Orion
production version of the M-23 Orion
M-26
incremental development of the M-16 series

== Specifications ==
Data from Jane's All the World's Aircraft 2010/11

General characteristics

- Capacity: 2
- Length: 4.33 m (14 ft 2 in) overall
- Height: 2.80 m (9 ft 2 in)
- Empty weight: 285 kg (628 lb)
- Max takeoff weight: 450 kg (992 lb) European ultralight limit (USA:550 kg)
- Fuel capacity: 82 L (18.0 Imp gal; 21.7 US gal)
- Powerplant: 1 × Rotax 914ULS flat four, 85 kW (114 hp)
- Main rotor diameter: 8.23 m (27 ft 0 in)
- Main rotor area: 53.20 m^{2} (572.6 sq ft)
- Propellers: 3-bladed Arplast, ground adjustable pitch, 1.70 m (5 ft 7 in) diameter

Performance

- Maximum speed: 194 km/h (121 mph, 105 kn)
- Cruise speed: 145 km/h (90 mph, 78 kn)
- Service ceiling: 4,000 m (13,000 ft) service
- Rate of climb: 5.0 m/s (980 ft/min) at sea level
