= Magni Vittoria =

Vittoria
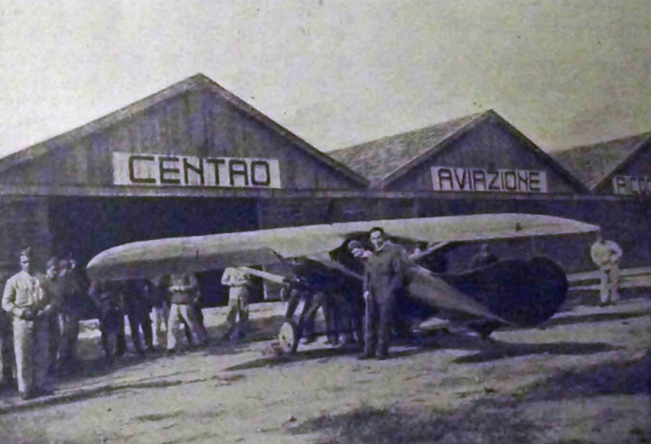

General information
- Type: Single-seat sports aircraft
- National origin: Italy
- Manufacturer: Piero Magni-Aviazione
- Designer: Piero Magni
- Number built: 2+

History
- First flight: 22 October 1924

The Magni PM.2 Vittoria was an Italian experimental, single seat, parasol wing aircraft built in the mid-1920s. It had a large area aerofoil on each of its single wing bracing struts which could be rotated together or independently to give lift or drag.

== Design ==
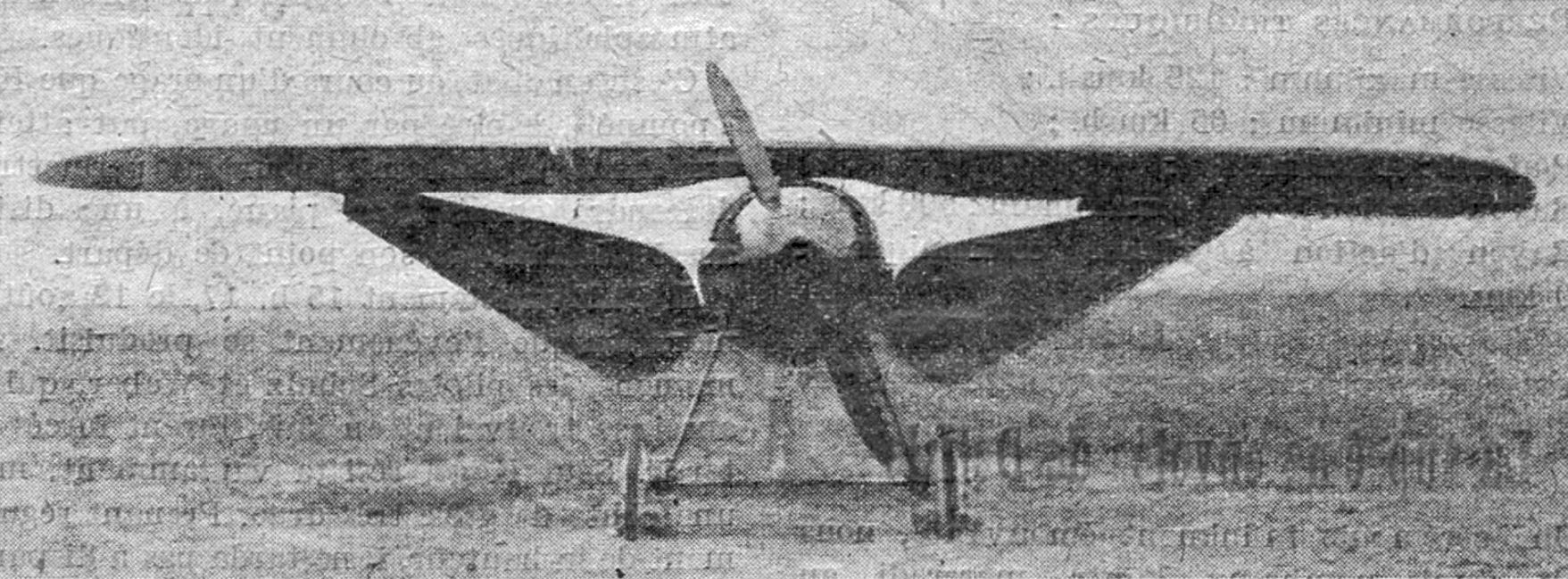
Magni Vittoria Model A photo from Les Ailes September 2, 1926

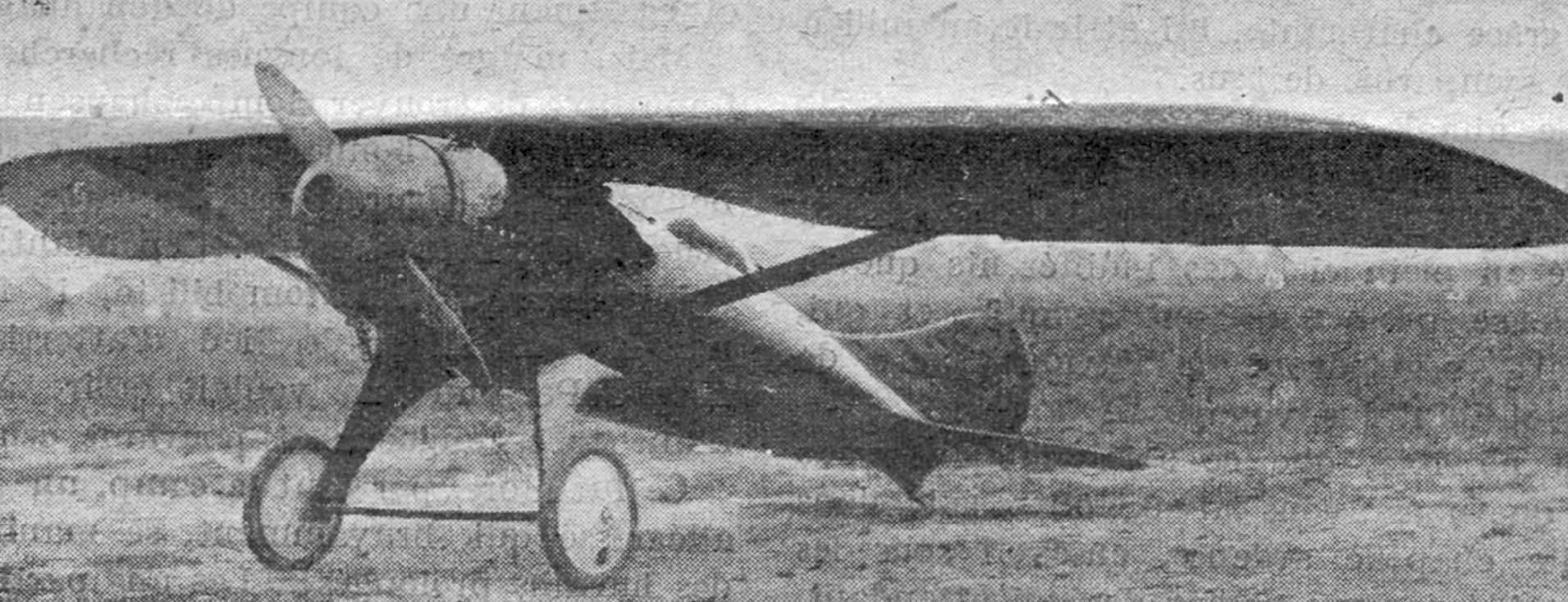
Magni Vittoria Model E photo from Les Ailes September 2, 1926

One contemporary report described the Magni Vittoria as a sesquiplane, although it is more correctly called a lifting strut. It evolved, by progressive reduction of the lifting strut, into a conventionally braced parasol wing monoplane. The strut was mounted at a single point on the lower fuselage and a second on the upper wing leading edge at about 70% of the span and could be rotated about this axis to act as an auxiliary lift surface at low angles of incidence or as an air brake at high angles. Magni had begun to study this idea as early as 1919, when he displayed a scale model of an aircraft, designed around a 37 kW (50 hp) Gnome rotary engine, which was displayed at the first post-war Paris Salon. He also tested models in the Eiffel wind-tunnel.

The Vittoria 1924 was his first full-scale aircraft. Its thin wing was unswept and had constant chord out to quadrantal tips. There was a deep and wide curved cutout over the cockpit to increase the pilot's field of upward view and broad-chord, long ailerons. The entirely wooden wing was in two parts, each with five spars, ten ribs and plywood covering. The forward four spars were curved near the tip, converging on the aft spar. The wings were mounted low over the fuselage on a short, steel frame cabane and braced by the axes of the lower wings.

Each lower wing, also wooden, had a single box spar as its axis with ribs and a strip around the leading edge and its lower rounded end. This end was pivoted to a triangular, transverse steel frame within the fuselage which also carried the cabane at its upper vertex. The ply-covered wing was straight-tapered to a squared-off upper end, where it pivoted in a short, inward-angled mounting with a broadly faired foot on the upper wing underside. The angle of incidence of each lower wing was adjustable between -3° and 90° with a lever at the pilot's side; the wings could be moved together by moving just the lefthand lever.

The Vittoria was powered by a 37 kW (50 hp), six cylinder Anzani 6A.20 radial engine. The metal engine frame, engine, aluminium cowling, aluminium spinner and two blade propeller could easily be detached from the fuselage behind it, a ply-covered semi-monocoque with wooden hoops, frames and longerons. The large, open cockpit was under the wing cutout, with an effective Triplex windscreen and a prominent, faired headrest which also enclosed a parachute.

The tail surfaces of the Vittoria were constructed, like the wings, with ply covering. The horizontal surfaces were mounted at mid-fuselage, though the tailplane was vestigial, more like a long fillet which carried large, balanced elevators with curved leading edges. The fin was broad and noticeably upswept, bearing a very broad, rounded rudder. Its undercarriage was fixed and conventional, with a pair of faired-in, wood and ply inverted L-struts on either side carrying a rubber cord sprung steel single axle, fitted with large diameter wheels. The steel-shod tailskid was mounted on a laminated ash spring.

== Development ==
The Vittoria was flown for the first time on 22 October 1924. A second example, designated model Vittoria 1925-A, was nearing completion in September 1925, differing from the 1924 model "in details only."

A year later, Magni had systematically investigated a series of six variations based on it, designated in pairs by letters A and B, C and D and E and F. The upper wing was unchanged throughout but the area of the lower wings was reduced between successive pairs; types E and F had only streamlined, rotatable bracing struts. The first member of each pair had larger ailerons than the second. Though some performance figures for the A configuration had been released, little had been said about the original objective of reducing landing speeds.

Magni continued to experiment with rotating bracing struts to the start of World War II. The Magni Vale of 1935 had a faired V-strut bracing the wing on each side. The leading members of these were fixed but the rear ones could be rotated as airbrakes as they could on the Vittoria.

== Variants ==
Vittoria 1924
first full-scale aircraft.
Vittoria 1925
second aircraft, tested in forms A ... F (see text).

== Specifications (Vittoria 1924) ==
Data from Les Ailes, September 1925 Performance figures for Vittoria 1925-A from Les Ailes. September 1926

General characteristics

- Crew: One
- Length: 5.56 m (18 ft 3 in)
- Wingspan: 8 m (26 ft 3 in)
- Height: 2.23 m (7 ft 4 in)
- Wing area: 10 m^{2} (110 sq ft) (11 m^{2} (120 sq ft) gross)
- Airfoil: P.M.14
- Empty weight: 282 kg (622 lb)
- Max takeoff weight: 411 kg (906 lb)
- Powerplant: 1 × Anzani 6A.20 6-cylinder radial, 37 kW (50 hp) at 1,525 rpm
- Propellers: 2-bladed Piero Magni 5, 2 m (6 ft 7 in) diameter on 1925-A
- Maximum speed: 150 km/h (93 mph, 81 kn)
- Time to altitude: 14 min 27 s to 2,000 m (6,600 ft)
