= Magnis =

Magnis may refer to:

- Magnis (Carvoran), the form of the name Magnae Carvetiorum (Carvoran) that appears in the Antonine Itinerary
- Magnis (Kenchester), the form of the name Magnae (Kenchester) that appears in the Antonine Itinerary
- Magnis Ridge, rock ridge in Antarctica
- Magnis Valley, ice-free valley in Antarctica

== See also ==
- Magna (disambiguation)
- Magni (disambiguation)
