= Magni Gyro =

Italian aircraft manufacturer

Coordinates: 45.6922321°N 8.7715992°E

Magni Gyro, srl
- Company type: Privately held company
- Industry: Aerospace
- Founded: 1986
- Founder: Vittorio Magni
- Headquarters: Besnate, Italy
- Products: Autogyros
- Website: www.magnigyro.it

Magni Gyro, srl is an Italian aircraft manufacturer based in Besnate and founded by Vittorio Magni in 1986. The company specializes in the design and manufacture of autogyros in the form of ready-to-fly aircraft.

The company is a Società a Responsabilità Limitata, an Italian limited liability company.

== History ==
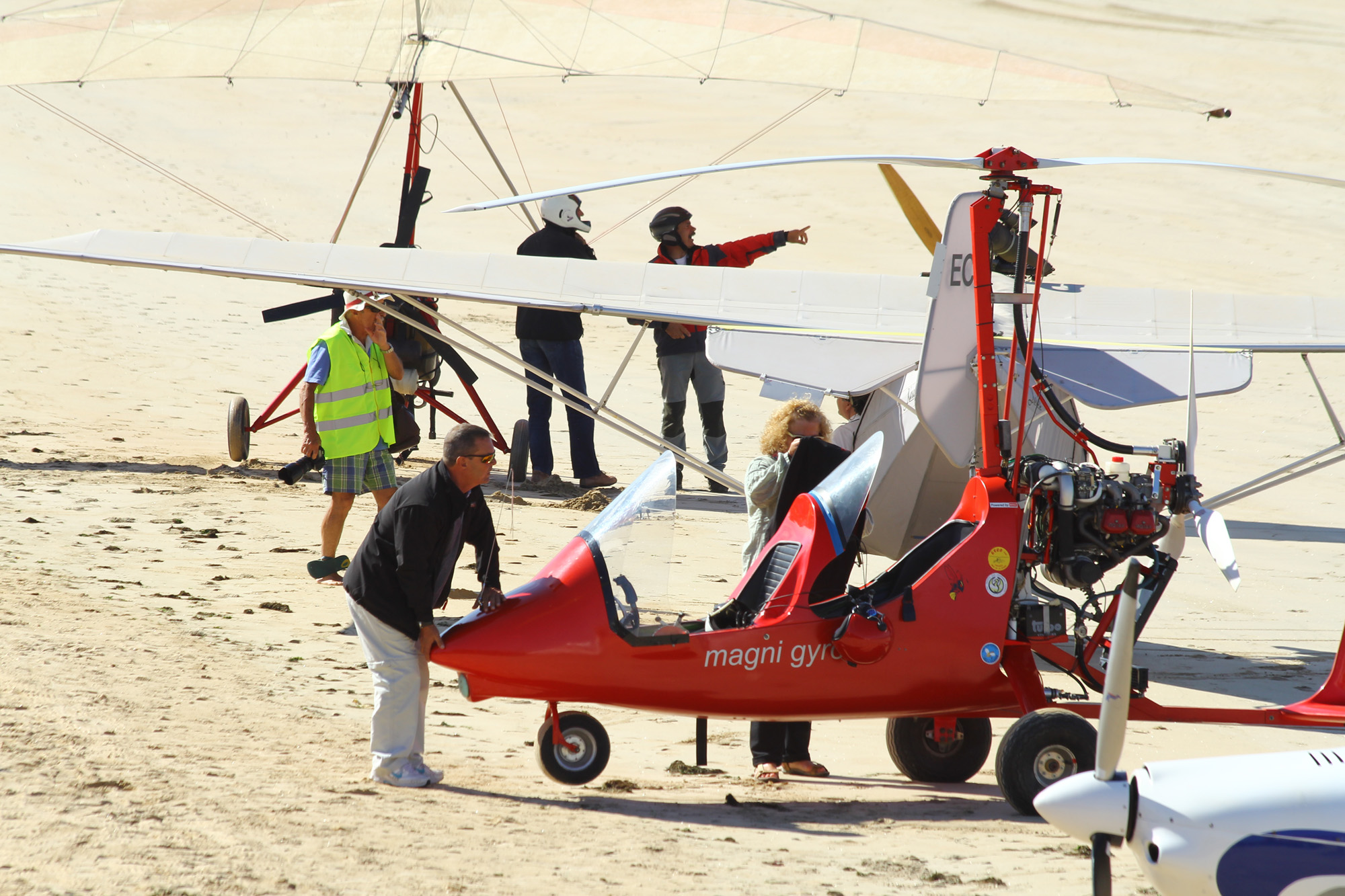
Magni M-16 Tandem Trainer

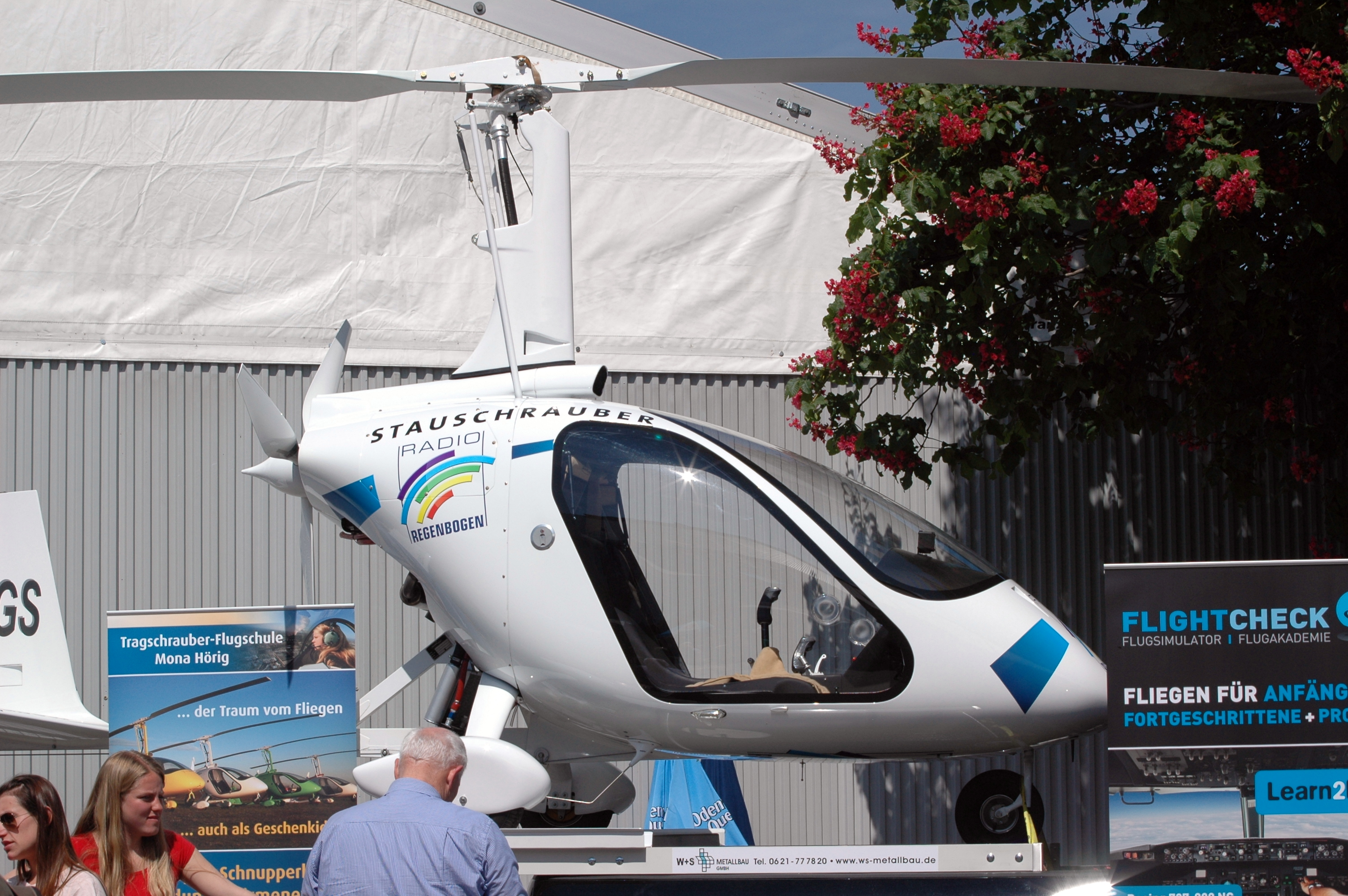
Magni M-24 Orion

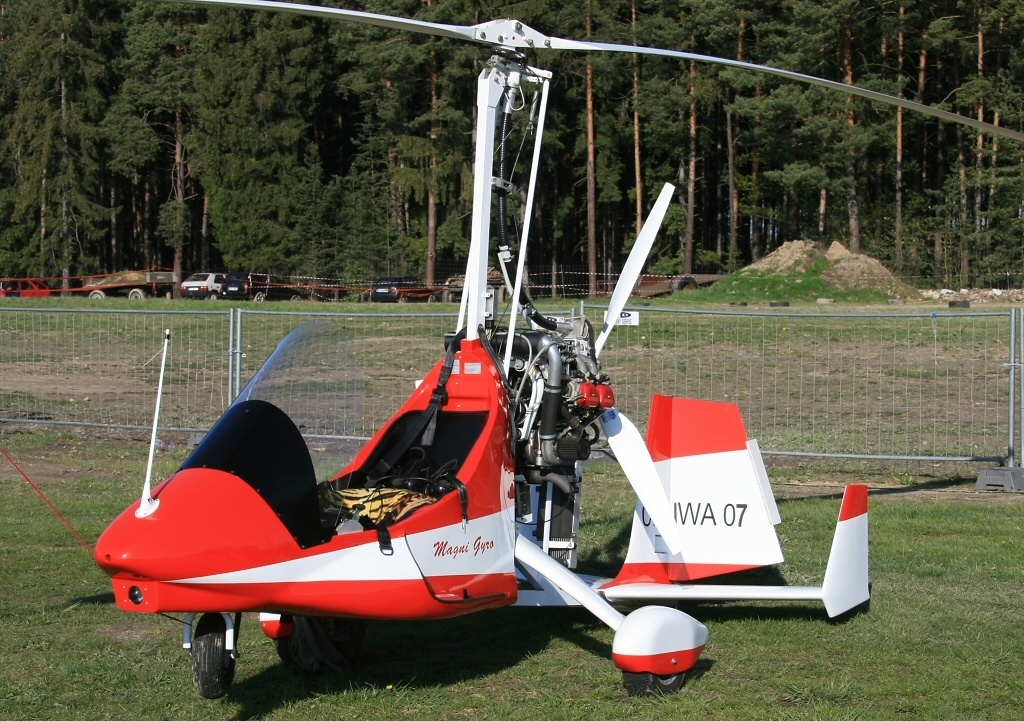
Magni M-14 Scout

Vittorio Magni was born in 1938 and started work in the rotorcraft industry in 1956 at Agusta. In 1967 he purchased plans for the Igor Bensen-designed B-8 autogyro and it became the first one flying in Italy. In 1968 he went to work for Silvercraft, building the Silvercraft SH-4 helicopter as the flight line supervisor and test pilot. In 1986 he started VPM SNC, to build composites and other parts as a subcontractor for helicopter manufacturers such as Agusta and Aerea SpA. The new company also built racing cars for the Spanish Constructora Nacional de Maquinaria Eléctrica S. A. (Cenemesa) concern. In 1996 the company's name was changed to Magni Gyro and the focus expanded to include the development of Magni's own autogyro designs.

Designs developed include the two-seat open cockpit M-14 Scout, the two-seat M-16 Tandem Trainer, the small single-seat open cockpit M-18 Spartan and the two side-by-side enclosed cabin M-24 Orion

== Aircraft ==
Summary of aircraft built by Magni Gyro:

- Magni M-5
- Magni M-7
- Magni M-14 Scout
- Magni M-16 Tandem Trainer
- Magni M-18 Spartan
- Magni M-19 Shark
- Magni M-20 Talon
- Magni M-21
- Magni M-22 Voyager
- Magni XM-23 Orion
- Magni M-24 Orion
- Magni M-26 Enclosed Tandem
