= Magni M-14 Scout =

Italian autogyro

M-14 Scout
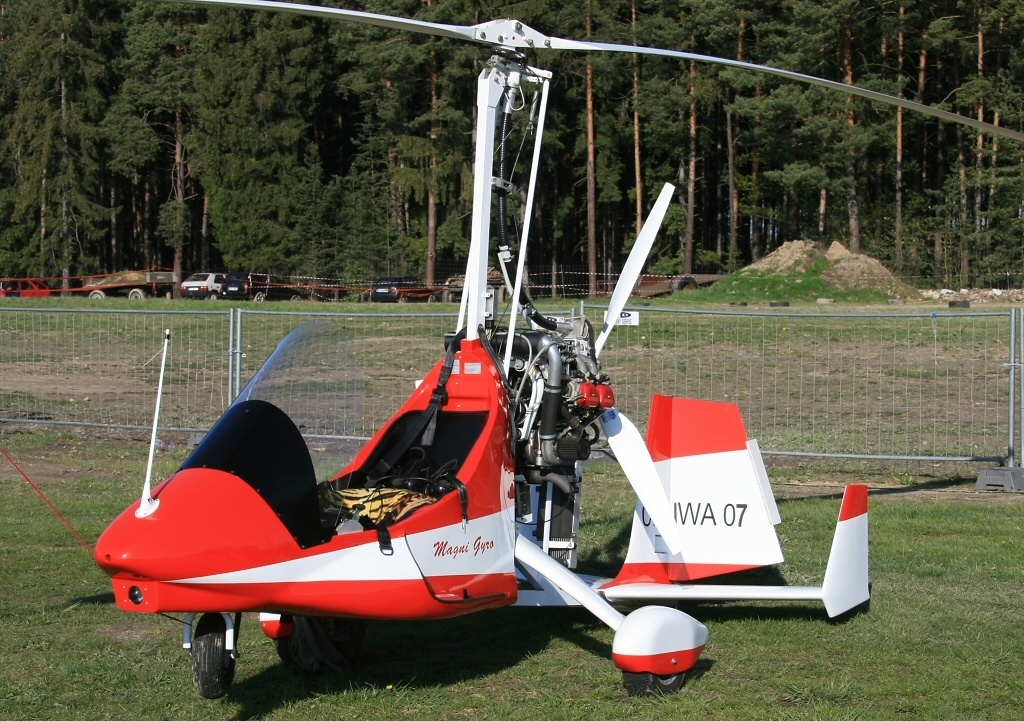
- M-14 Scout-2000

General information
- Type: Autogyro
- National origin: Italy
- Manufacturer: Magni Gyro srl
- Status: In production (2013)

The Magni M-14 Scout is an Italian autogyro, designed and produced by Magni Gyro srl of Besnate. The aircraft is supplied as a complete ready-to-fly-aircraft.

== Design and development ==
The M-14 features a single main rotor, a two-seats-in a tandem open cockpit with a windshield, tricycle landing gear with wheel pants and a four-cylinder, air and liquid-cooled, four-stroke, dual-ignition 100 hp (75 kW) Rotax 912S engine in pusher configuration. The turbocharged 115 hp (86 kW) Rotax 914 powerplant is optional.

The aircraft fuselage is made from TIG-welded 4130 steel tubing, while the cockpit fairing is fibreglass. Its 8.23 m (27.0 ft) diameter composite rotor has a chord of 22 cm (8.7 in) and is manufactured in house by Magni Gyro. The propeller is a three-bladed carbon fibre, ground adjustable type. Electric trim is standard equipment, as is a Flydat digital engine monitor. The second seat is located right behind the pilot's seat without a separate cockpit, dual controls or windshield and is intended for occasional use to carry a passenger. The pilot's seat includes an integral 50 litres (11 imp gal; 13 US gal) fuel tank that provides three hours endurance. The aircraft has an empty weight of 244 kg (538 lb) and a gross weight of 550 kg (1,213 lb), giving a useful load of 306 kg (675 lb).

== Specifications (M-14 Scout) ==
Data from Bayerl

General characteristics

- Crew: one
- Capacity: one passenger
- Empty weight: 244 kg (538 lb)
- Gross weight: 550 kg (1,213 lb)
- Fuel capacity: 50 litres (11 imp gal; 13 US gal)
- Powerplant: 1 × Rotax 912ULS four cylinder, liquid and air-cooled, four stroke aircraft engine, 75 kW (101 hp)
- Main rotor diameter: 8.23 m (27 ft 0 in)
- Propellers: 3-bladed carbon fibre, ground adjustable

Performance

- Maximum speed: 185 km/h (115 mph, 100 kn)
- Cruise speed: 145 km/h (90 mph, 78 kn)
- Endurance: 3 hours
- Rate of climb: 5 m/s (980 ft/min)

Avionics

- Flydat digital engine monitor
