= Magni M-18 Spartan =

Italian autogyro

M-18 Spartan

General information
- Type: Autogyro
- National origin: Italy
- Manufacturer: Magni Gyro srl
- Status: Production completed (2013)

The Magni M-18 Spartan is an Italian autogyro, that was designed and produced by Magni Gyro srl of Besnate. The aircraft was supplied as a kit for amateur construction or as a complete ready-to-fly-aircraft

While listed as in production in 2011, by 2013 the M-18 Spartan was no longer advertised by Magni Gyro as part of their product line.

== Design and development ==
The M-18 was the smallest autogyro offered by the company. It features a single main rotor, a single-seat open cockpit with a windshield, tricycle landing gear with wheel pants and a twin cylinder, air-cooled, two-stroke, dual-ignition 64 hp (48 kW) Rotax 582 engine in pusher configuration.

The aircraft fuselage is made from TIG-welded 4130 steel tubing, while the cockpit fairing is fibreglass. Its 7.30 m (24.0 ft) diameter rotor has a chord of 22 cm (8.7 in). The propeller is a three-bladed carbon fibre, ground adjustable type. The supplied fuel tank holds 35 litres (7.7 imp gal; 9.2 US gal). The aircraft has an empty weight of 167 kg (368 lb) and a gross weight of 300 kg (661 lb), giving a useful load of 133 kg (293 lb).

== Specifications (M-18 Spartan) ==
Data from Bayerl

General characteristics

- Crew: one
- Empty weight: 167 kg (368 lb)
- Gross weight: 300 kg (661 lb)
- Fuel capacity: 35 litres (7.7 imp gal; 9.2 US gal)
- Powerplant: 1 × Rotax 582 twin cylinder, liquid-cooled, two stroke aircraft engine, 48 kW (64 hp)
- Main rotor diameter: 7.30 m (23 ft 11 in)
- Propellers: 3-bladed carbon fibre, ground adjustable

Performance

- Maximum speed: 168 km/h (104 mph, 91 kn)
- Cruise speed: 112 km/h (70 mph, 60 kn)
- Rate of climb: 3.5 m/s (690 ft/min)
