= Pietro Magni =

Pietro Magni may refer to:

- Pietro Magni (sculptor) (1817–1877), Italian sculptor
- Pietro Magni (engineer) (1898–1988), Italian aeronautical engineer
- Pietro Magni (footballer) (1919–1992), Italian footballer and football manager
