= Magni M-16 Tandem Trainer =

Italian autogyro

Tandem Trainer
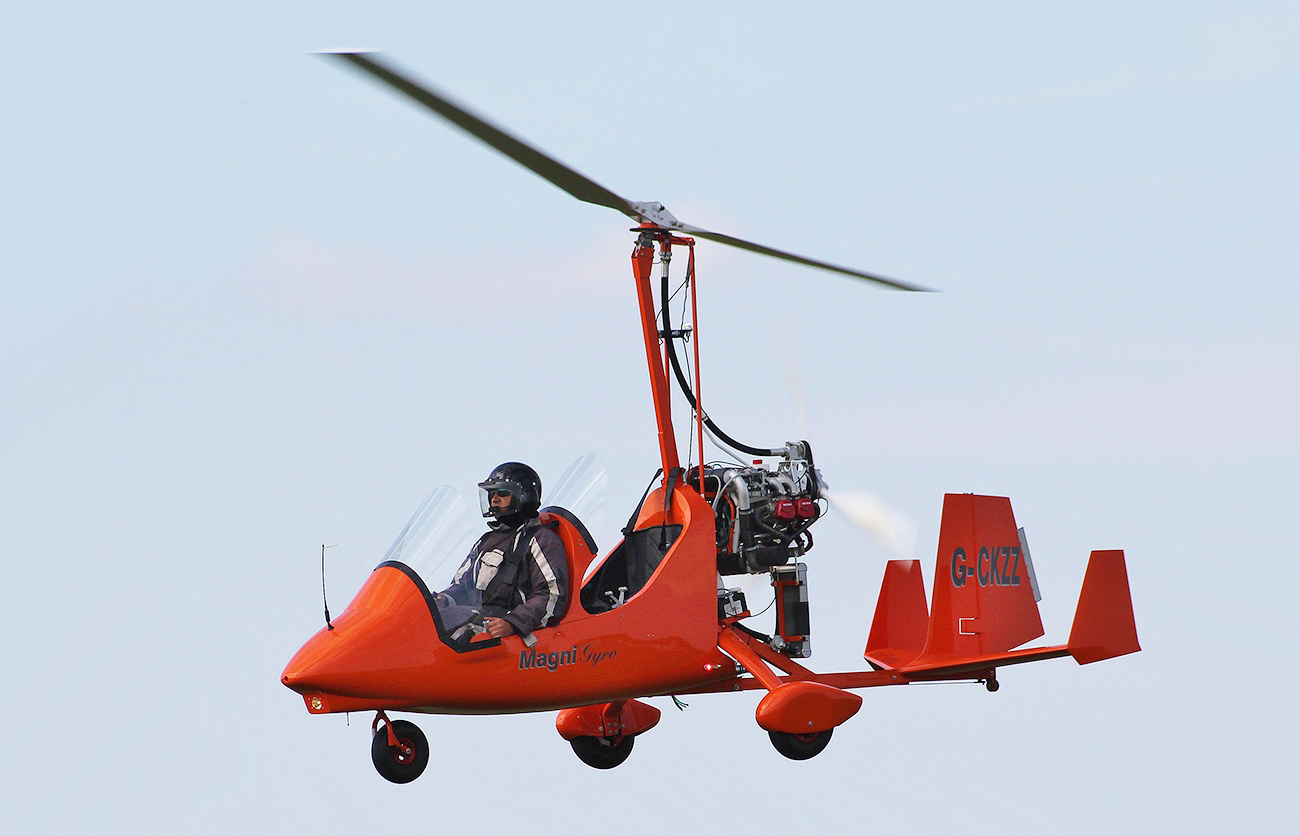

General information
- Type: Two seat autogyro
- National origin: Italy
- Manufacturer: Magni Gyro srl, Besnate
- Number built: M-16>120; M-22>44

History
- Introduction date: 2000

The Magni M-16 Tandem Trainer is an Italian sport autogyro, seating two in tandem, designed and produced by Magni Gyro srl of Besnate. It and the M-22 Voyager, a touring variant with baggage space and increased endurance, remain in production in 2010 with over 150 sold.

== Design and development ==
Magni Gyro currently (2010) produces five sport autogyro models, all with similar pod and low boom, pusher engine layouts. They differ chiefly in the accommodation: both the M-16 and the newer, closely similar M-22 Voyager have open cockpits and tandem seats.

An 85 kW (114 hp) Rotax 914UL flat-four engine is mounted high and uncowled behind the pod, driving a 3-bladed pusher propeller. Below it the slender flat-sided boom carries the fibreglass empennage, which consists of a swept horizontal stabilizer with end-plate fins and a larger, central, fin and rudder. The 2-bladed rotor, mounted on a mast above the pod, is of composite construction. The open cockpits are fitted with dual controls. The M-16 has a tricycle undercarriage with the faired mainwheels on spring cantilever legs. The steerable nosewheel is unfaired.

The newer M-22 is optimised for touring with the inclusion of a pair of long side pods into the lower fuselage. These have their own access doors and together provide 150 L (5.3 cu ft) of baggage space. The M-22 is flown only from the front seat.

== Operational history ==
By mid-2010 there were 114 M-16s and 44 M-22s on European (Russia excluded) civil aviation registers. At least 6 have appeared on the registers of South Africa and the US.

Most have been used as sports and recreational aircraft but some have been employed in agricultural spraying and survey work over nature reserves, traffic observation, fire prevention and photographic mapping.

In 2015, an M-16 was used for a record attempt in USA.

In May 2016, American pilot Paul Salmon flew an M-22 to set a new Fédération Aéronautique Internationale distance record for gyroplanes in the 500 to 1,000 kg (1,102 to 2,205 lb) class of 770 nmi (1,426 km) in 10 hours and 37 minutes, during a nonstop flight from Cape Girardeau, Missouri, to Longview, Texas, United States.

In 2019, UK pilot James Ketchell flew an M-16C around the world, in 122 stages over 175 days.

== Operators ==
Belarus

ЦСП Центр специальной подготовки (STC special training center) – at least one M-16 labeled EW-483SL.

== Variants ==
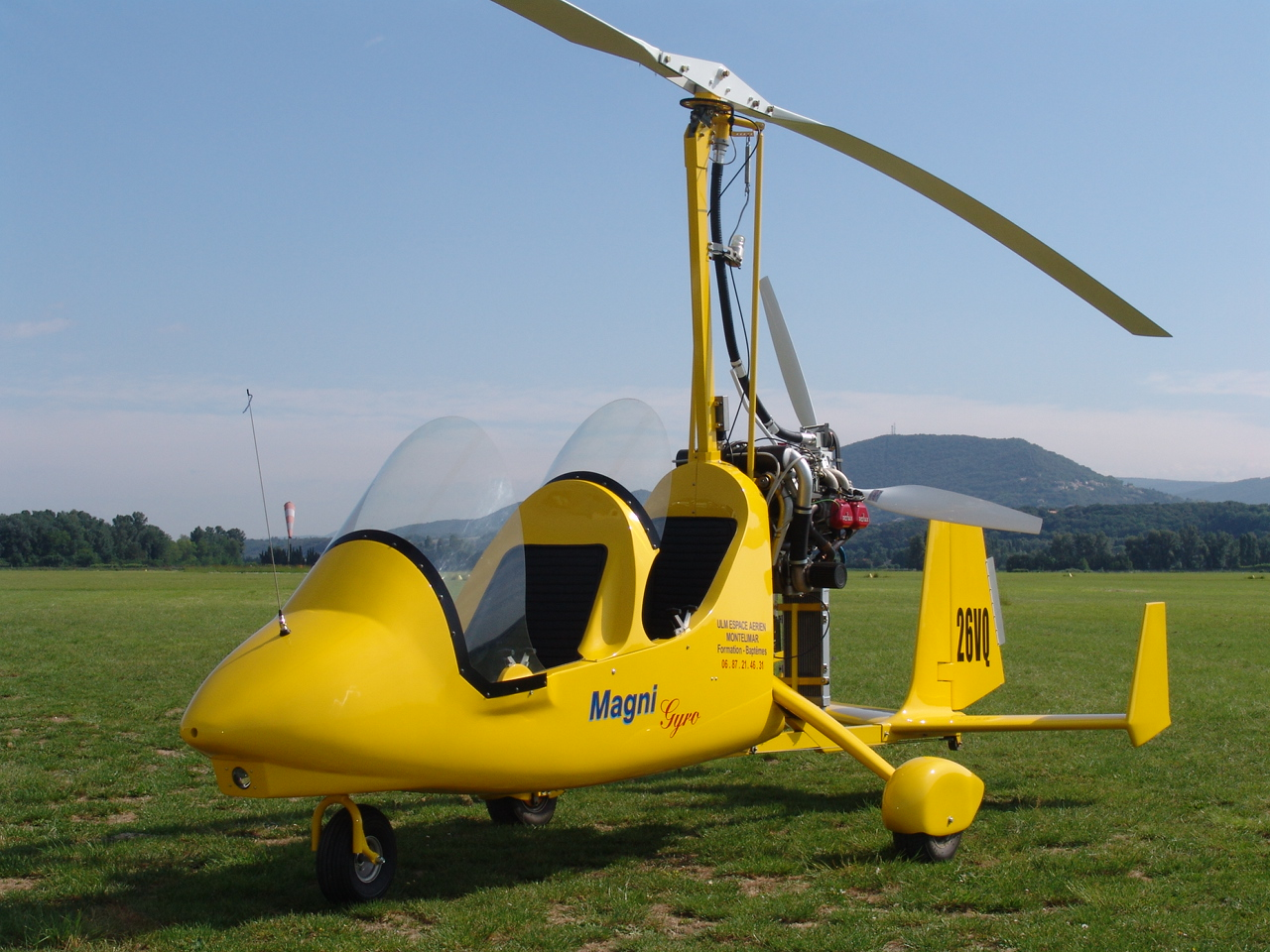
Magni M16 Tandem Trainer

Data from Jane's All the World's Aircraft 2010/11 except where specified.

M-16 Tandem Trainer
Initial version. Normally powered by a Rotax 914UL, but a 74 kW (99 hp) Rotax 912 ULS may be fitted. Introduced 2000.
M-16-2006 Tandem Trainer
Improved lubrication, cooling, centre of gravity position and avionics. Introduced 2006.
M-19 Shark
Enclosed cockpit version. Only three prototypes built, no production.
M-22 Voyager
Touring version with baggage space. An increase in fuel capacity to 80 L (17.6 Imp gal or 21.1 US gal) gives it an endurance of 4 hrs. Other specifications are as M-16 apart from an empty weight increase to 280 kg (617 lb). (Note: Jane's All the World's Aircraft give the rotor diameter of the M-22 as 8.53 m; some sources, e.g. Magni UK, give the same figure for the M-16. The corresponding area is 57.1 m^{2}.) Introduced June 2005.

== Specifications (M-16-2006) ==
Data from Jane's All the World's Aircraft 2010/11

General characteristics

- Capacity: 2
- Length: 4.70 m (15 ft 5 in) overall
- Height: 2.70 m (8 ft 10 in)
- Empty weight: 261 kg (575 lb)
- Max takeoff weight: 450 kg (992 lb) European ultralight limit (USA:550 kg)
- Fuel capacity: 72 L (15.8 Imp gal; 19.0 US gal)
- Powerplant: 1 × Rotax 914UL turbocharged flat four, 85 kW (114 hp)
- Main rotor diameter: 8.23 m (27 ft 0 in)
- Main rotor area: 53.20 m^{2} (572.6 sq ft)
- Propellers: 3-bladed Arplast, ground adjustable pitch, 1.70 m (5 ft 7 in) diameter

Performance

- Maximum speed: 185 km/h (115 mph, 100 kn)
- Cruise speed: 145 km/h (90 mph, 78 kn)
- Range: 480 km (300 mi, 260 nmi) no reserves
- Endurance: 3 hr
- Service ceiling: 3,500 m (11,500 ft)
- Rate of climb: 5.0 m/s (980 ft/min) at sea level
