= Magán, Spain =

Magán
- Municipality
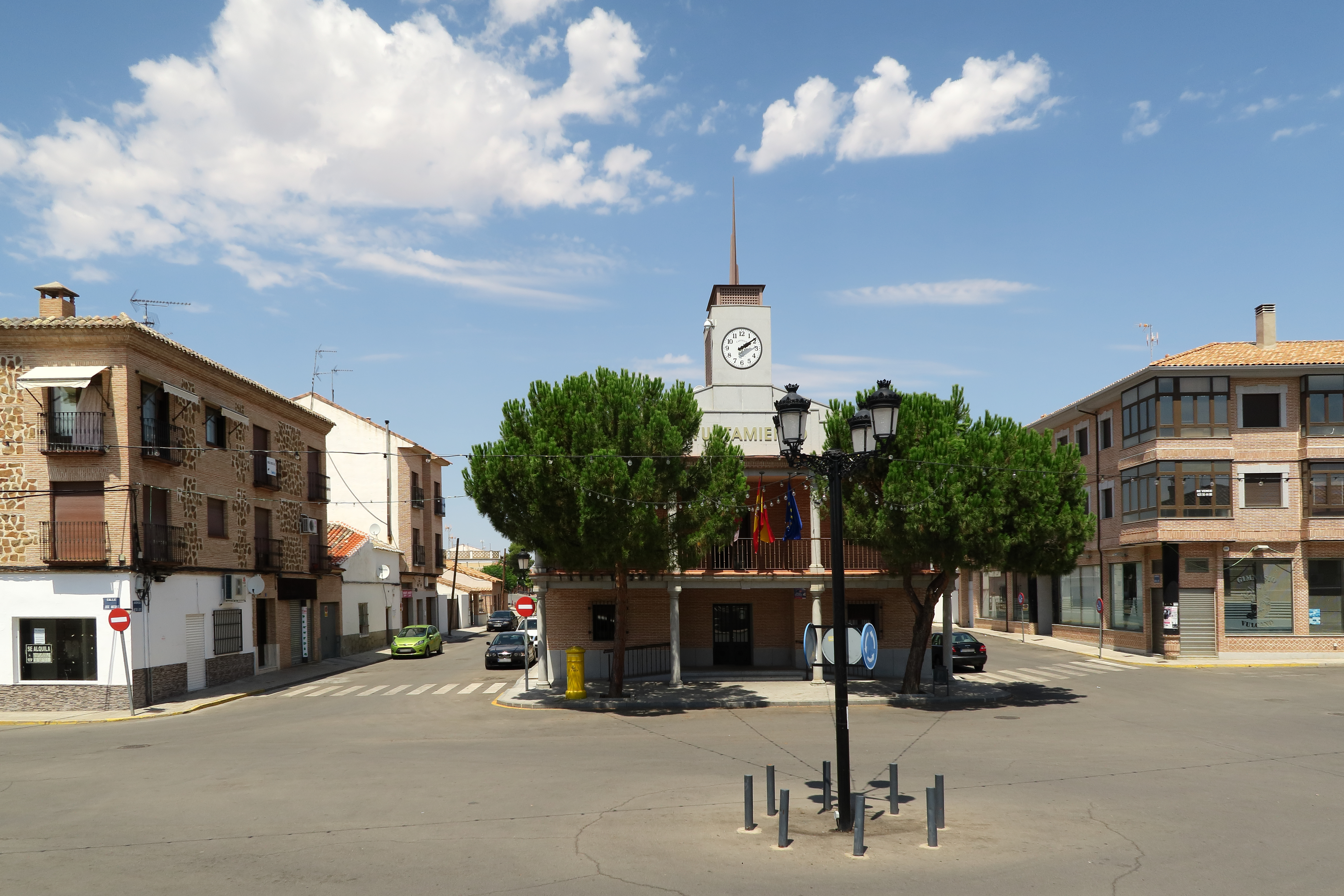
- Magán Town Hall

- Flag Coat of arms

- Location within Castilla-La Mancha
- Coordinates: 39°57′N 3°55′W
- Country: Spain
- Autonomous community: Castile-La Mancha
- Province: Toledo

Area
  - Total: 29.24 km^{2} (11.29 sq mi)
- Elevation: 697 m (2,287 ft)

Population (2025-01-01)
  - Total: 4,384
  - Density: 149.9/km^{2} (388.3/sq mi)
- Time zone: UTC+1 (CET)
  - Summer (DST): UTC+2 (CEST)

Magán is a municipality located in the province of Toledo, Castilla–La Mancha, Spain. As of 1 January 2023, the municipality has a registered population of 4,038. It has a total area of 29.24 km^{2}.
