= Giovanni Battista Magni =

Italian painter

Giovanni Battista Magni, also known as il Modenino, (1592–1674) was an Italian painter of the Baroque period, active in Rome.

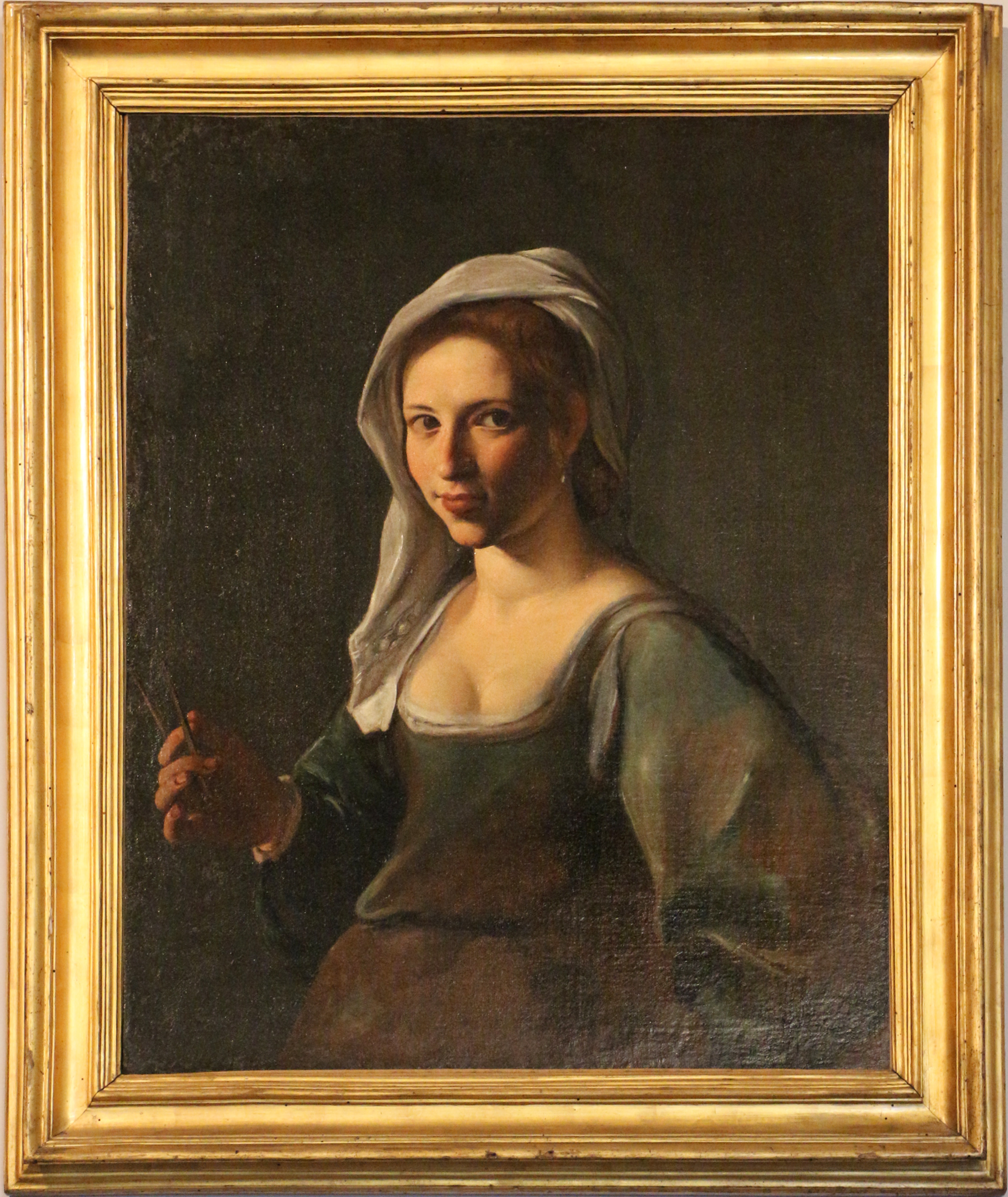
