= Arsago Seprio =

Arsago Seprio, Lombardia
- Comune
- Comune di Arsago Seprio
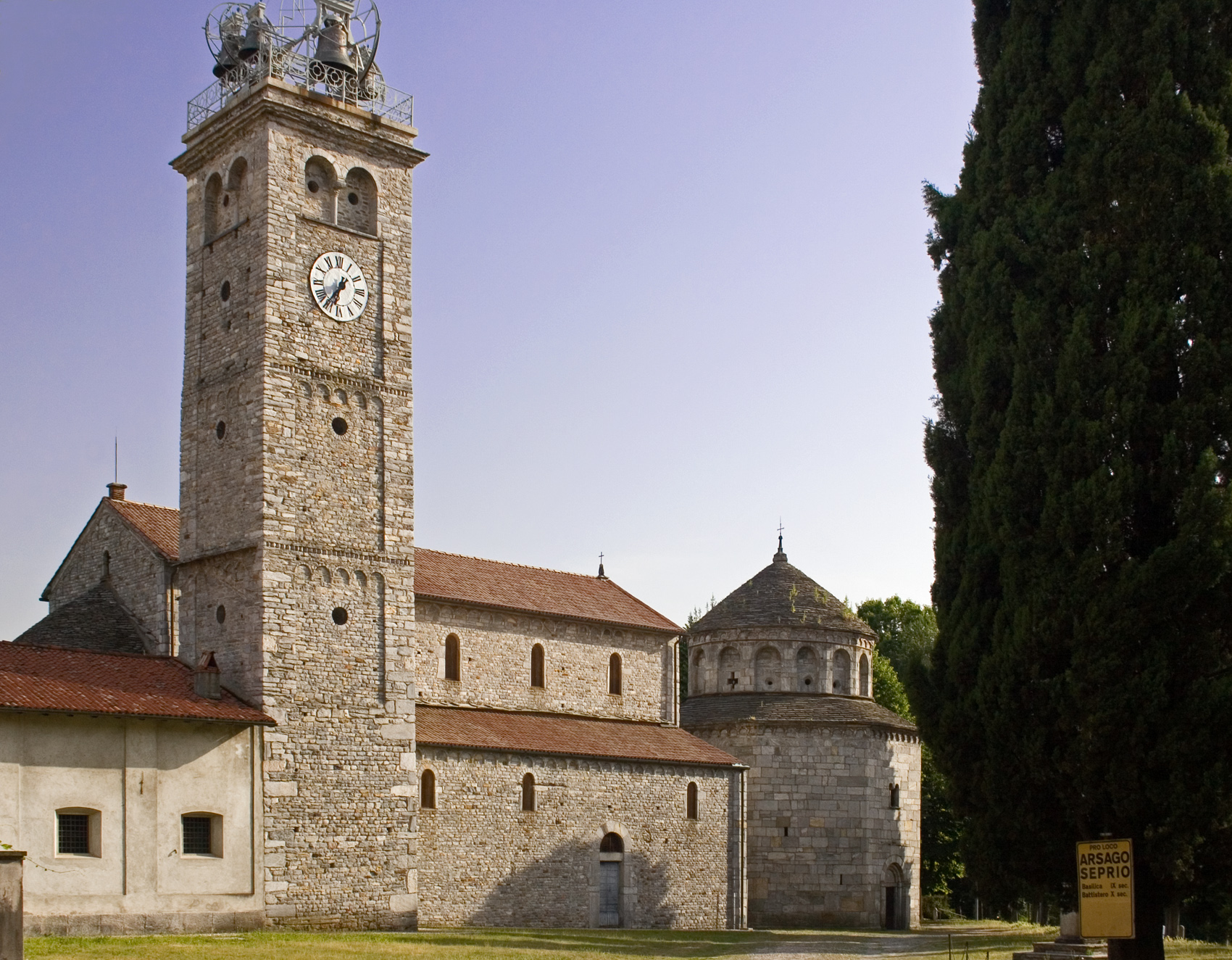
- San Vittore's basilica and S.Giovanni's baptistry (built around the 9th and 12th centuries)

- Coat of arms

- Location of Arsago Seprio, Lombardia in Italy Arsago Seprio, Lombardia (Lombardy)
- Coordinates: 45°41′N 08°44′E
- Country: Italy
- Region: Lombardy
- Province: Varese (VA)

Government
  - Mayor: Fabio Montagnoli

Area
  - Total: 10 km^{2} (3.9 sq mi)
- Elevation: 290 m (950 ft)

Population (31 December 2020)
  - Total: 4,765
  - Density: 480/km^{2} (1,200/sq mi)
- Demonym: Arsaghesi
- Time zone: UTC+1 (CET)
  - Summer (DST): UTC+2 (CEST)
- Postal code: 21010
- Dialing code: 0331
- Website: Official website

Arsago Seprio is a town and comune located in the province of Varese, in the Lombardy region of northern Italy.

It is known for archaeological remains of a Longobard (or Lombard) necropolis and a Romanic church and baptistery from the 9th and 10th century AD. Arsago is also known in the international sporting world as the site of World motocross championships which have been taking place since the mid-1980s.

== Culture ==
=== Archeological and Paleontological Museum ===
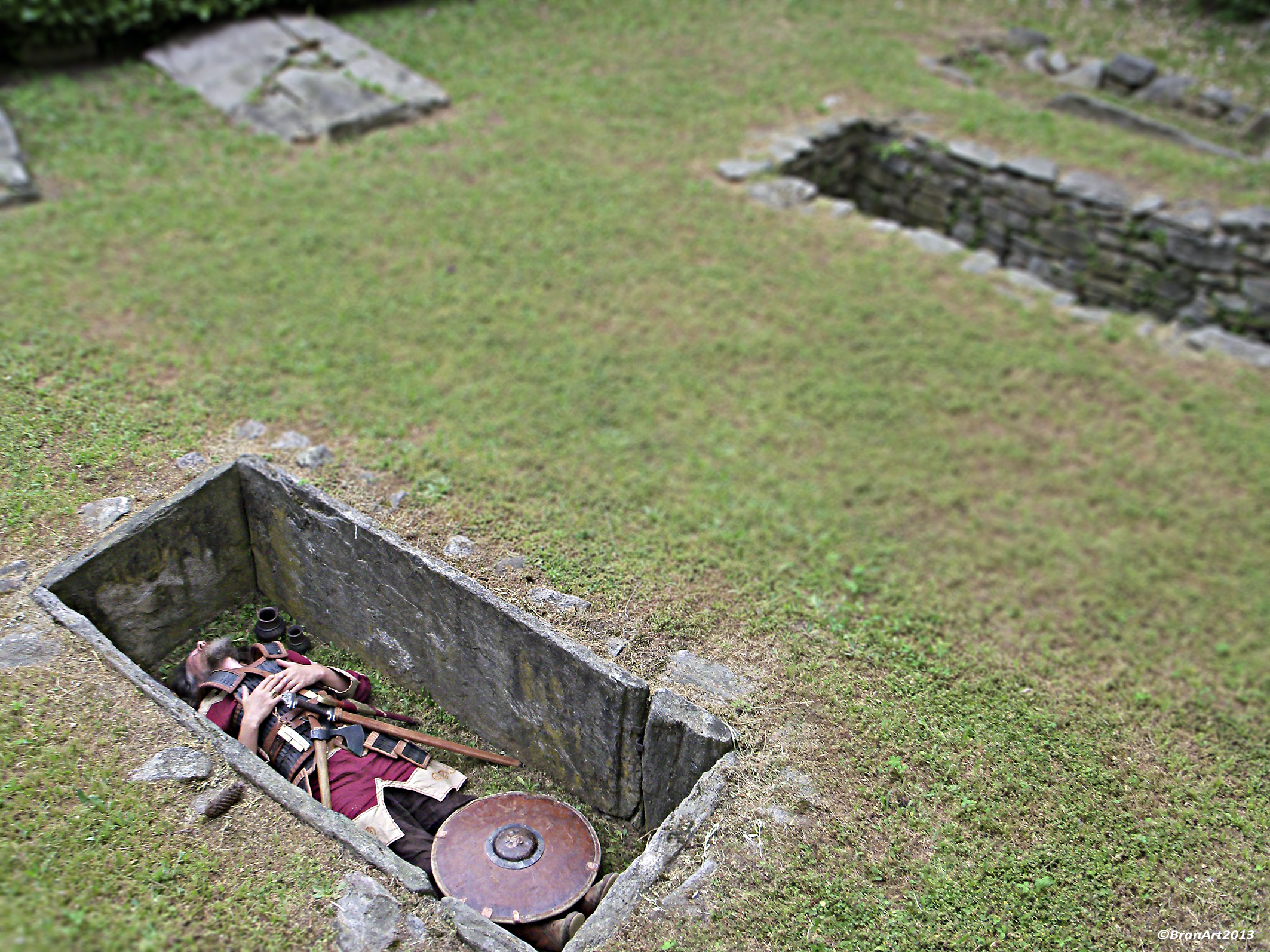
Longobard burial used during an historical reenactment

Civico Museo Archeologico e Collezione Paleontologica "G.C. Politi" is a civic museum located on the site of a Longobard necropolis. It hosts an exhibition of Longobard and Roman antiquities.

== Sport ==
=== A.S.D. Arsaghese ===
A.S.D. Arsaghese is a football club based in Arsago Seprio. It was founded in 1935. It is registered with the Italian Football Federation (FIGC) under serial number 3250. The club is known for its distinctive main colors of red and white. Throughout its history, ASD Arsaghese has participated in various regional leagues and tournaments.

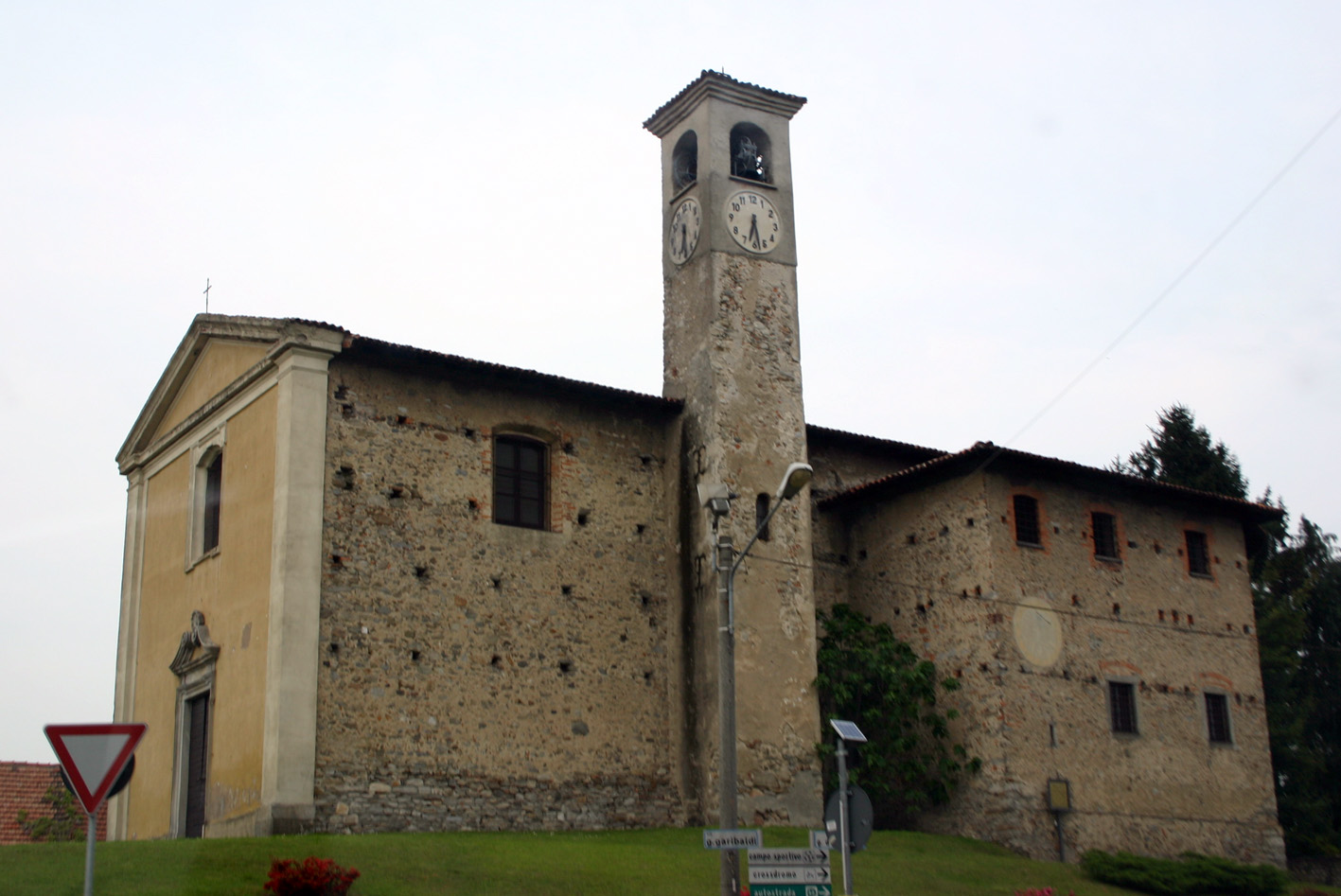
Santa Maria in Monticello church
