= Magni Vale =

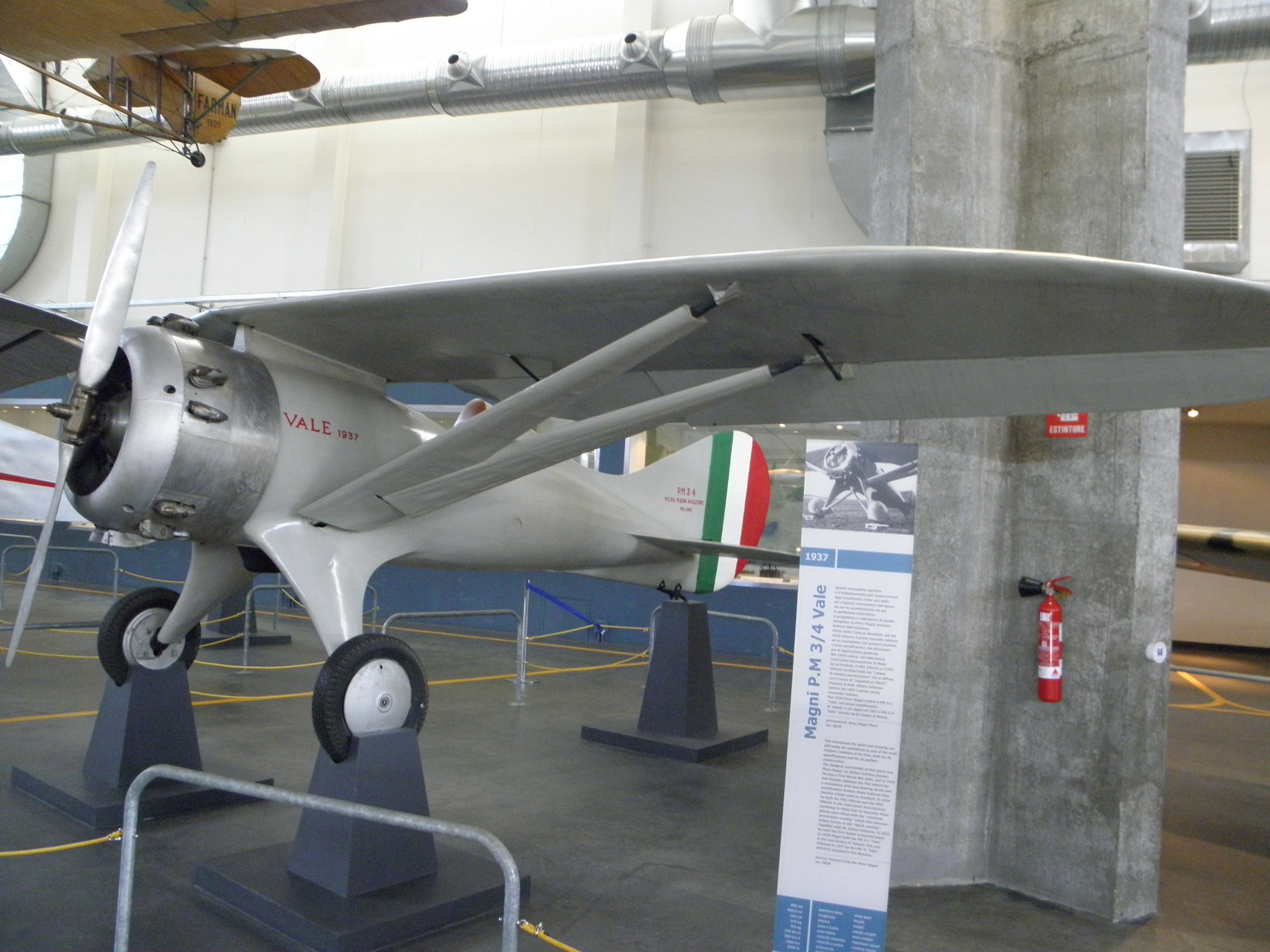
- The only Magni Vale on display at Museo della Scienza e della Tecnologia "Leonardo da Vinci", Milan, Italy

General information
- Type: Monoplane tourer and aerobatic trainer
- National origin: Italy
- Manufacturer: Piero Magni-Aviazione
- Designer: Piero Magni
- Number built: 1

History
- First flight: 1930s

The Magni Vale PM-3-4 was an Italian civil monoplane for use as a tourer or aerobatic trainer designed and built by Piero Magni-Aviazione in Milan.

== Design and development ==
The Vale was a sleek single-seat parasol wing braced monoplane powered by a 130 hp (97 kW) Farina T.58 radial engine. An improved variant, the Supervale PM-4-1 had a 140 hp (104 kW) Fiat A.54 engine. The start of the second world war halted design and development by the company.

== Variants ==
Vale PM-3-4
Powered by a 130 hp (97 kW) Farina T.58 radial engine.
Supervale PM-4-1
Powered by a 140 hp (104 kW) Fiat A.54 engine.

== Specifications (Vale) ==
Performance figures calculated

Data from Les Ailes 7 February 1935

General characteristics

- Crew: One
- Length: 5.50 m (18 ft 1 in)
- Wingspan: 8.90 m (29 ft 2 in)
- Height: 2.02 m (6 ft 8 in)
- Wing area: 10.69 m^{2} (115.1 sq ft)
- Empty weight: 540 kg (1,190 lb)
- Gross weight: 765 kg (1,687 lb)
- Powerplant: 1 × Farina T.58 5-cylinder radial engine, 97 kW (130 hp)
- Propellers: 2-bladed

Performance

- Maximum speed: 250 km/h (160 mph, 130 kn)
- Cruise speed: 200 km/h (120 mph, 110 kn)
- Minimum control speed: 90 km/h (56 mph, 49 kn)
- Range: 1,000 km (620 mi, 540 nmi)
- Service ceiling: 7,000 m (23,000 ft)
