= Many =

Many (/ˈmɛni/) may refer to:

- grammatically plural in number
- an English quantifier used with count nouns indicating a large but indefinite number of; at any rate, more than a few

Place names

- Many, Moselle, a commune of the Moselle department in France
- Mány, a village in Hungary
- Many, Louisiana, a town in the United States
- Many, Masovian Voivodeship, east-central Poland

== Surname ==
- Moshe Many, Israeli urologist; President of Tel Aviv University, and President of Ashkelon Academic College.
