= Magán & Rodríguez =

Spanish DJ duo (2008–2009)

- Origin: Spain
- Genres: Latin house
- Years active: 2008-2009
- Label: Blanco y Negro
- Past members: Juan Magan; Marcos Rodriguez

Magán & Rodríguez was a successful DJ and singing / production duo made up of Juan Magán (full name Juan Manuel Magán González) and Rodriguez (full name Marcos Rodriguez) and specializing in Electro Latin dance music. The duo was particularly successful in Spain in 2008 and 2009 with a number of charting singles through Blanco y Negro record label.

== Members ==
Juan Magan (full name Joan Magán González) also known as FAO was a popular Spanish Electronic & Latin music producer and DJ. He was well known for his cooperation with a number of artists. He released a series of such collaborations with Xavi Kolo, Afro Deep, David Campoy, Freddy G, Gemma Ansodi, Tony Thomas, Fafa Monteco, César Del Rio, Danny Morales, Gio Lopez, Puku. Releases spanned from 2001 to 2008. Labels releasing his materials included Vale Music, Spacecraft, Underphone Recordings, Bonita Musica, Hypnotic Music, Cassagrande, Centro Recordings, Hot Hot Music and Available Recordings, among many. Very notably he also cooperated with Marcos Rodriguez resulting in forming a duo with him.

Marco Rodriguez started DJing at a young age. He released his solo My Love EP Hypnotic Music in 2002. Meeting Juan Magan, an already established artist, he was presented to a wide audience through the EP Salsa that was credited to "Magan presents Marcos Rodriguez".

Magan & Rodrigues: As the cooperation consolidated, they formed the DJ production and singing partnering duo Magan & Rodriguez with Marco using Rodriguez as a mononym rather than his full name. The duo released a series of hits including "Suck My Suave", "Bora Bora". The duo released a full album Suave and a three-series EP Suave EP, Suave EP 2 and Suave EP 3 in the period 2008 and 2009. in 2009, they also released a collection album of songs and cooperation with a number of artists under the title We Love Asere.

== After Magan & Rodriguez ==
As the two members went into their other solo careers, Magan has released the single "Friday Night" with Josepo in 2010, single "Un Momento" in 2011 where he is featured with Inna, and soundtrack to film Te voy a esperar in 2012.

== Discography ==
=== Albums ===
List of albums, with selected chart positions and certifications
Title	Album details	Peak chart positions	Track listing
Title	Album details	Spain	Track listing
Suave	Released: 2008; Credited to: Magan & Rodriguez; Genre: Electro Latin; Label: Blanco y Negro (MXCD 1779); Format: CD, Album	–	1. "Suck My..." (extended clip mix); 2. "Bora Bora" (original extended); 3. "El senor de la noche" (feat. Manu GZ); 4. "A Gozar"; 5. "Merenguito"; 6. "The Rumba"; 7. "El otro soy yo" 8. "Loco" (feat. Javi Garcia & Jonathan N.); 9. "Musica Magica"; 10. "El Globo"; 11. "Suck My..." (original mix; bonus track); 12. "Mixapella"

==== Others ====
Juan Magan presents Marcos Rodriguez
- 2004: Salsa (EP)
Juan Magan & Marcos Rodriguez
- 2009: We Love Asere

=== EPs ===
List of albums, with selected chart positions and certifications
Title	Album details	Track listings
Suave EP	Released: 2008; Genre: Electronic House Latin; Label: Blanco y Negro ( MX 1779); Format: Vinyl, 12"	1. "El senor de la noche" (extended version); 2. "Suck My..." (extended clip mix); 3. "Bora Bora" (original extended); 4. "Bora Bora" (Jason Tregebov remix)
Suave EP 2	Released: 2008; Genre: Electronic House Latin; Label: Blanco y Negro ( MX 1779R); Format: Vinyl, 12", EP	1. "The Rumba" (feat. Danny Mendiola & Peter Mac); 2. "Marenguito" (feat. Sergio Perez); 3. "A Gozar"
Suave EP 3	Released: 4 August 2008; Genre: Electronic House Latin; Label: Blanco y Negro (MX 1779 RR); Format: 12", EP, 45 RPM, 33 ⅓ RPM	1. "El Globo"; 2. "Loco" (feat Javi Garcia & Jonatan N*); 3. "El otro soy yo" (feat. Tony Martinez & Josepo)

=== Singles ===
Year	Title	Chart positions	Certifications
Year	Title	Spain	Certifications
2007	"No dare ni un paso atrás"	–	
2008	"Suave"	19	
2008	"Bora Bora"	–	PROMUSICAE: 2× Platinum (Ringtone)
2009	"Suck My..."	2	
