= George Magan (Gaelic footballer) =

Irish Gaelic footballer

Personal information
- Native name: Seoirse Mag Annaidh (Irish)
- Born: 16 July 1894 Allenstown, County Meath, Ireland
- Died: Unknown
- Occupation: Garda Síochána

Sport
- Sport: Gaelic football
- Position: Right wing-forward
Club
- Years: Club
- Celbridge
Club titles
- Kildare titles: 0
Inter-county
- Years: County
- 1918–1925: Kildare
Inter-county titles
- Leinster titles: 1
- All-Irelands: 1

George Magan (born 16 July 1894) was an Irish Gaelic footballer who played as a right wing-forward for the Kildare senior team.

A noted sportsman of his era, Magan made his first appearance for the team during the 1918 championship and was a regular member of the starting fifteen until his retirement after the 1925 championship. During that time, he won one All-Ireland SFC medal and one Leinster SFC medal.

At club level Magan played with the Celbridge team.
