= Piero Magni =

Italian aeronautical engineer

Piero Magni (Genoa, December 22, 1898 – April 17, 1988) was an Italian aeronautical engineer. He was heavily involved with the National Advisory Committee for Aeronautics later in his career.

Magni contributed to the development of variable incidence and canard wings. His work extended beyond design, as he also became an entrepreneur. He founded a company focused on the licensed production of gliders, and later took on the responsibility of aircraft auditing for the Regia Aeronautica. He designed the Vittoria 1924 sport plane.

Magni also succeeded in manufacturing some designs and patented a cowling for radial engines that improved the aircraft's aerodynamics efficiency. This innovative cowling not only enhanced aerodynamic penetration but also provided an effective system for regulating the engine's temperature. This project, known as Anello Magni, was later further developed by the National Advisory Committee for Aeronautics, and become widely known as NACA cowling.
