= Besnate =

- Comune
- Comune di Besnate

- Location within Italy Location within Lombardy
- Coordinates: 45°42′N 08°46′E
- Country: Italy
- Region: Lombardy
- Province: Varese (VA)
- Frazioni: Buzzano, Centenate

Government
  - Mayor: Giovanni Corbo (Democratic Party)

Area
  - Total: 7 km^{2} (2.7 sq mi)
- Elevation: 296 m (971 ft)

Population (31 December 2004)
  - Total: 5,021
  - Density: 720/km^{2} (1,900/sq mi)
- Demonym: Besnatesi
- Time zone: UTC+1 (CET)
  - Summer (DST): UTC+2 (CEST)
- Postal code: 21010
- Dialing code: 0331
- Patron saint: San Martino V.
- Saint day: 11 November

Besnate is a town and comune in the province of Varese in Lombardy in Northern Italy. The Commune of Besnate has a land area of 7.68 square kilometres (2.97 mi^{2}) and an average elevation of 300 metres (980 ft) above sea level. Its highest point, in the hills of Ravellino, reaches 330 metres (1,080 ft). It includes the following locations: Besnate, Buzzano, Centenate, and Villaggio Veneto.

It is bordered to the north by the municipality of Sumirago, north-east to Jerago with Orago, south-east to Cavaria with Premezzo, south to Gallarate, in the south-west to north-and Arsago Seprio west with that of Mornago. Besnate is about 17 kilometres (11 mi) from Varese, 7 kilometres (4 mi) from Gallarate, 13 kilometres (8 mi) from Busto Arsizio and 7 kilometres (4 mi) from Somma Lombardo.

The Commune of Besnate has always been independent until 1869, when, by Royal Decree No. 4919, was suppressed and aggregated with that of Casorate Sempione, the municipality of Arsago Seprio. Just a few years later, however, from 1 August 1872, Besnate broke away from Arsago Seprio to join Jerago: thus was born the town of Jerago with Besnate, which from 1 July 1892, was also the location of aggregate Orago.

Finally with the law n ° 48 of 28 February 1907, the municipality of Jerago with Besnate and Orago was dissolved and from 1 July 1907 Besnate finally became an independent municipality. In 2007 the municipality of Besnate, on the occasion of the centenary of the establishment of the town had it printed by the Italian postal souvenir postcards and stamps.

== Physical geography ==
The municipality of Besnate is part of the geographical area identified as Olona Valley, and is located in a hilly area between the Arno river and the River Ticino. In the southern part of Besnate meet the Fontanili, a phenomenon caused by rainwater entering the permeable layers of soil, consisting of boulders, pebbles, gravel and sand and re-emerge on the surface when they encounter a layer of impermeable clay, forming a large area of water springs, which lies to the east of the provincial road of Gallarate, and to the foot of the moraine hills on which part of the territory of Jerago with Orago and Cavaria with Premezzo.

In this wetland Besnate converge some waterways, the canal Pont-Peder, the Fontanile Fontanile Old and New, which, flowing together, form Sorgiorile the river, the main tributary of the river Arno.

== Politics ==
The mayor of Besnate is Giovanni Corbo, member of the Democratic Party. He has been re-elected in 2024 after his victory at the mayoral election with 1,355 votes (47,9%). There were other two candidates: Andrea Bori (supported by Forza Italia and the League) who got 1,169 votes (41,4%) and Nadia Dal Secco (supported by Brothers of Italy), Who received only 303 votes (10,7%).

There are twelve citizens who seats at the Municipal Council, and they distributed as follows:

Government (8):

- With Us for Besnate (centre-left)

Opposition (4):

- 3 Civic List for Besnate (League+Forza Italia)
- 1 We are Besnate (Brothers of Italy)

== Notable people ==
- Paolo Basso, sommelier
- Edward Ravasi, cyclist
