= List of gliders (O) =

This is a list of gliders/sailplanes of the world, (this reference lists all gliders with references, where available) Note: Any aircraft can glide for a short time, but gliders are designed to glide for longer.

== O ==
=== Obad ===
- Obad OS-2 Musa
- Obad OS-3 Musa Kesedzija

=== Oberlerchner ===
(Josef Oberlerchner Holzindustrie)

- Oberlerchner Mg 19
- Oberlerchner Mg 23

=== Oberti ===
(R. Oberti)

- Oberti Falco
- Oberti Gabbiano

=== Österreichischer Aeroclub ===
(Österreichischer Aeroclub – Austrian Aero Club)

- Standard Austria

=== Olansky ===
- Olansky Straton D-8
- Olansky Straton D-8 Moby Dick
- Olansky Mini Straton D-7

=== Oller ===
- Oller Dussel

=== Oldershaw ===
(Vern Oldershaw)

- Oldershaw O-2 Jana-Linn
- Oldershaw O-3

=== OMRE ===
(Országos Magyar Repülő Egyesület Központi Javító Műhelyében – Central Workshop of Hungarian Aeronautical Association)

- OMRE M-30 Fergeteg (whirlwind) – (Lajos Beniczky)
- OMRE Bene – (Hugó Nagy)
- OMRE OE-01 – a.k.a. Rubik R-20 – (M. Papp & Erno Rubik)

=== Onigkeit ===
(Otto Onigkeit)

- Onigkeit 1938 glider

=== Onishi ===
- Onishi OSG3

=== Operation Sigma ===
(John Sellars & Operation Sigma Ltd)

- Operation Sigma Sigma
- Operation Sigma Type A
- Operation Sigma Type B
- Operation Sigma Type C
- Operation Sigma (Marsden) Sigma

=== Orlican ===
(Vyvojova Skupina Orlican / Orlican Chocen)

- Orlican VSO 10 Vosa
- Orlican VT-116 Orlik II
- Orlican VT-16 Orlik

=== Oškinis ===
(Bronius Oškinis)

- Oškinis BrO-03 Pūkas
- Oškinis BrO-04 Rūta
- Oškinis BrO-05 Rūta 2
- Oškinis BrO-09A Žioga
- Oškinis BrO-09B Žiogas
- Oškinis BrO-09C Žiogas
- Oškinis BrO-10 Pūkas 3
- Oškinis BrO-11 Pionierius
- Oškinis BrO-11M Zylė
- Oškinis BrO-12
- Oškinis BrO-12 Bangos
- Oškinis BrO-14
- Oškinis BRO-16
- Oškinis BrO-17 S Bitele
- Oškinis BRO-17U Utochka
- Oškinis BrO-17 V Antele
- Oškinis BrO-18 Boruze
- Oškinis BrO-20 Pukelis
- Oškinis BrO-21 Vyturys
- Oškinis BrO-22 Rutele
- Oškinis BRO-23KR Garnys
- Oškinis T-1
- Oškinis T-2

=== OVL ===
(Fritz Müller / Ostschweizer Verein für Luftfahrt e. V., Zürich)

- OVL Austria
- OVL Zurivogel

=== Oxford Gliding Club ===
(Oxford Gliding Club)

- Oxford Gliding Club glider

=== Ozite ===
- A. Thoenes / ''OZITE-Verkaufs GmbH''
- Ozite glider
