= List of Czechoslovak gliders =

This is a list of gliders/sailplanes of the world, (this reference lists all gliders with references, where available) Note: Any aircraft can glide for a short time, but gliders are designed to glide for longer.

== Czechoslovak miscellaneous constructors ==
Data from:

- ASP-3 – Brno Technical university – a.k.a. NSv-3
- Benes LD 605 Haban
- Bohemia B.5 – HALLER, Oldřich
- Dvořáček BDV-2 1931 DVOŘÁČEK, Břetislav
- FPZ-I Chichich
- HALLER ZA-2 1923 HALLER, Oldřich
- Hela-Zbodlina 1936 CACÁK, Antonín & ŠOLC...
- HLDZ-1 1924 Cpt. ZEMAN, Tomáš
- HLDZ-2 Čáp 1924 ZEMAN, Tomáš
- Hofírkův Milan – HOFÍREK, Stanislav
- Holeka Míra 3 1924 HOLEKA, Rudolf
- JK-1 Perun
- KKB-15 – Kusbach Bartoník & Kotolánem
- Kodytek 1925 glider KODYTEK, Josef
- Královič K-7 Úderník 1953 Kráľovič, Anton
- KRYŠPÍN JK-1 Perun 1922 KRYŠPÍN, Jan
- LET L-13 Blaník – Let Kunovice – Dlouhý, Karel
- LET L-23 Super Blaník - Let Kunovice
- Litomyšl-1 1927 – BÍNA, Karel
- Matejcek M-17 Universal – Matejcek, Jiri – students of the Central Aeronautical Institute, Brno-Medlanky
- Mayer MO-9 1935 MAYER, Oldřich
- Mayerovi Chachar 1927 MAYEROVI, Oskar & MAYERO...
- MiMi B-3 Šídlo 1950 Milose Micika
- Mišurec-Pučan MP-2 1935 MIŠUREC, Jindrich & PUČ...
- MOV Káně 1935 MAYER, Oldřich
- Můra 1922
- Nebeský NSV-3 1925 NEBESKÝ, Jaroslav & NEB...
- Nitra 1 – Štkpt. Koželuh
- Nitra 3 1925 Štkpt. KOŽELUH
- Orlican VT-16 Orlik 1956 Orlican Chocen
- Orlican VT-116 Orlik II
- Orlican VSO 10
- Pánka 1924 1924 Pánka
- Pavelek P-1 1936 PAVELEK, František
- Pavelek P-2 1937 PAVELEK, František
- Pešta Peta-Z 1934 PEŠTA, František
- Phoenix Air Phoenix – Phoenix Air sro Letrohrad, Czech Republic
- Pitrman PP-1 Tulák 1936 PITRMAN, František & PE...
- Praha 1922 glider – Skupina Konstrktér
- Prěmysl P-3
- Racek-3 Mrkev 1935 KANTOR, František
- Rackaři ŠBK-1 Racek-1
- Revallo R-1 Urpín
- Schmid S-1 1925 SCHMID, Jaromír
- Schmid S-3 1929 SCHMID, Jaromír
- Slamka-Plesko SP-II Osa 1946 SLAMKA, Rudolf & PLESKO,...
- Špitálský ŠP-2 Kamarád 1934 ŠPITÁLSKÝ, Jaroslav
- Špitálský ŠP-2A Fortuna 1936 ŠPITÁLSKÝ, Jaroslav
- ŠPŠ-1 Bábinka 1931 ŠPITÁLSKÝ, Jaroslav
- ŠTROS K-2 Sova 1938 ŠTROS, Vladimir
- ŠTROS K-3 Sokol 1939 ŠTROS, Vladimir
- Suchý BS-1 1933 SUCHÝ, Jindřich & SUCH...
- Suchý BS-2 Olešná 1935 SUCHÝ, Jindřich & SUCH...
- Sup 1922 glider
- Trejbal-Prasil Rok Vyroby
- TeST Gliders
- Tulák 37
- Tunzeng Zobor 1 1923 TUNZENG, Jaromír
- Tunzeng Zobor 2 1925 TUNZENG, Jaromír
- Váhaly-Sands Jánošík 1936 VÁHALY, H. & SANDS, S.
- Vinklar Polydor 1937 VINKLAR, Karel & ŠVEBIŠ...
- Voříšek Sup 1922 1922 VOŘÍŠEK, Jaroslav
- VP-1 Jánošík 1936 VÁHALA, Hubert & PLEŠK...
- VSM-40 Démant
- Orlican VSO 10 Vosa – Vyvojova Skupina Orlican
- Vyskočil VŠ-504 Hemelice VYSKOČIL, Jaroslav
- Wiesner Schrudim 1937 WIESNER, Jaroslav
- Zrna FPZ-1 Chichich 1936 ZRNA, Antonín
