= Oškinis BRO-16 =

BRO-16

General information
- Type: Flying boat, biplane training glider
- National origin: USSR
- Designer: Bronis Oškinis

History
- First flight: August 1973

The Oškinis BRO-16, sometimes known as the Oškinis BRO-16 Pempė (Pempė in Lithuanian translates as Northern Lapwing), was a flying boat, biplane training glider, flown and produced in the USSR in the 1970s.

== Design and development ==
The BRO-16 was a single-seat training glider, unusual for being both a biplane and a flying boat. It was a development of the BRO-11 land monoplane produced some twenty years earlier and first flew in August 1973.

Its wings were rectangular in plan out to rounded tips. The lower wing was 25% shorter in span than the upper but with about the same chord and ply-covered in contrast to the fabric covered upper wing. Both wings had single-spar structures and were braced together with wide spread, transverse, streamlined and distorted V-struts between the spars. There was no stagger, 3° of dihedral and a large interplane gap. The BRO-16's push-rod activated, fabric-covered ailerons, which could also serve as flaps, were suspended from the upper wing and filled 87% of the span.

The BRO-19's fuselage had a forward nacelle attached to a flat girder fuselage supporting the tail. The largely wooden nacelle was 3.70 m (12 ft 2 in) long and flat-bottomed. The cockpit, close to the nose, was open and placed the pilot over the leading edge of the lower wing which was mounted on the side of the nacelle, about halfway back. The rear of the fuselage was formed by a horizontal girder member, just under the upper wing, attached to the nacelle with a pair of vertical struts between the wings and an oblique strut from the rear of the nacelle to the top of the aft vertical strut. Wires braced the rear fuselage to the wing struts and to the nacelle. Parts of the girder were canvas-covered.

The tail was conventional. Though the triangular fin was very small, the rudder was large, nearly rectangular in profile apart from a blunted top and a slightly angled underside. The tailplane was triangular in plan and carried rectangular elevators. All the tail surfaces were fabric-covered wooden structures.

== Operational history ==
The BRO-16 was mass produced, though numbers are not available. They operated from the Lithuanian Kaunas Reservoir.

== Variants ==
BRO-16 Pempė
main production variant.
BRO-17U Utochka
Short span (7.00 m (23 ft 0 in) variant. Rectangular plan wings, the upper divided into three staggered, overhanging slats. Completion uncertain.

== Specifications (BRO-16) ==
Data from Jane's All the World's Aircraft 1975-76

General characteristics

- Crew: one
- Length: 5.24 m (17 ft 2 in)
- Upper wingspan: 7 m (23 ft 0 in)
- Lower wingspan: 5.8 m (19 ft 0 in)
- Height: 3.65 m (12 ft 0 in)
- Wing area: 8.26 m^{2} (88.9 sq ft) upper

6.00 m^{2} (64.58 sq ft) lower

- Aspect ratio: 3.8:1
- Airfoil: TsAGI R-II (14%)
- Aileron section: TsAGI R-III (16%)
- Empty weight: 129 kg (284 lb)
- Max takeoff weight: 204 kg (450 lb)
- Dihedral: 3° 24' on both upper and lower wings
- Incidence: 3°

Performance

- Wing loading: 12.3 kg/m^{2} (2.5 lb/sq ft)
