= Orličan VT-16 Orlík =

VT-16 Orlík
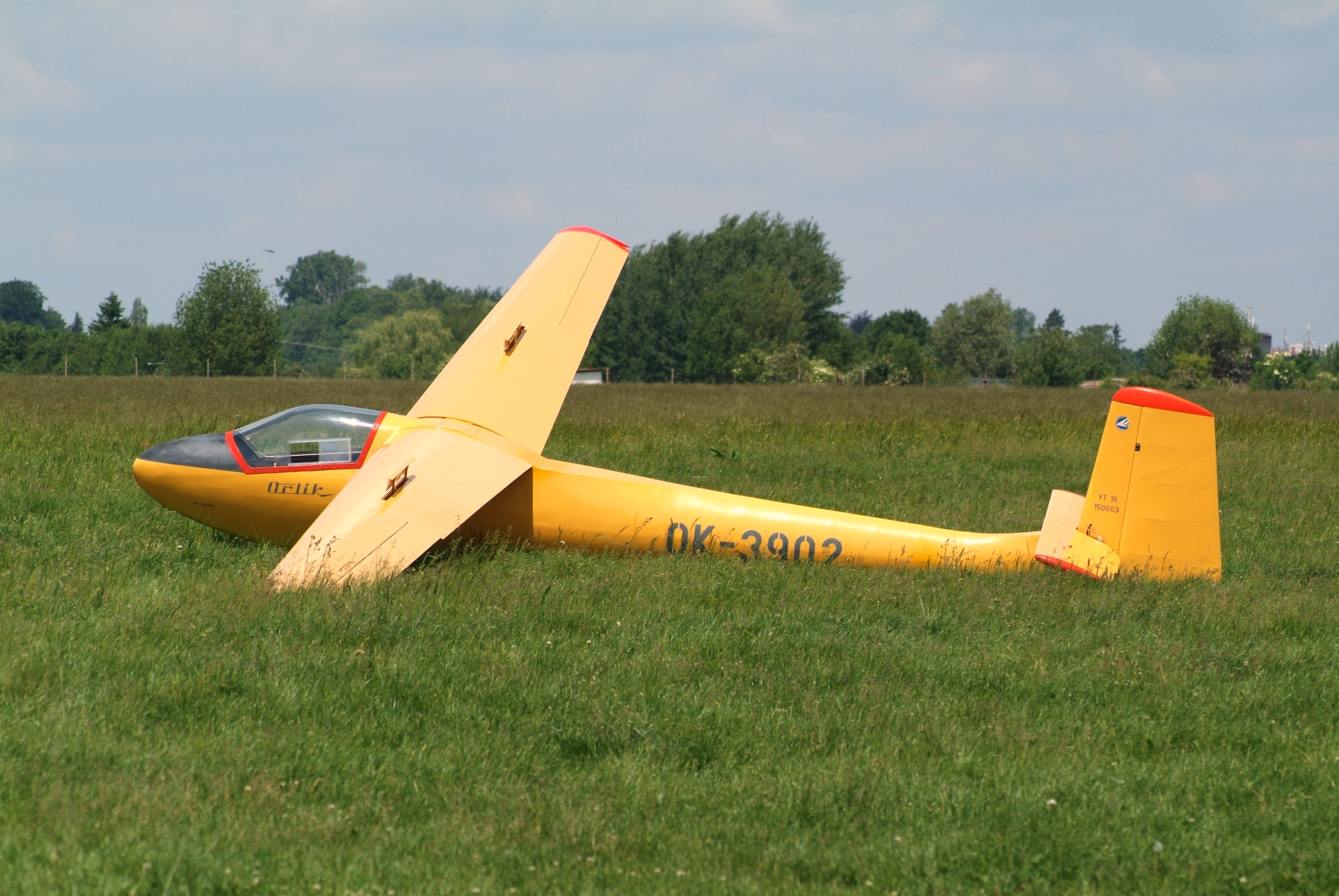

General information
- Type: Club and competition single-seat glider
- National origin: Czechoslovakia
- Manufacturer: Orličan
- Designer: Jiří Matějček
- Number built: c. 85

History
- First flight: August 1959

The Orličan VT-16 Orlík is a single-seat club glider, serving Czech gliding clubs and setting several national records in the early 1960s.

== Design and development ==
The VT-16 Orlík was designed by Jiří Matějček and is a high-wing monoplane of all-wood construction, except that the skin is stabilized with polystyrene foam. Its wing has a single spar structure with a forward torsion box; the whole wing is plywood skinned and foam filled, allowing the ribs to be comparatively widely spaced. In plan it is straight-tapered with blunt tips; there are 3° of dihedral. It has conventional plain ailerons and spoilers at mid-chord, which extend both above and below the wing. At the time of its first flight in August 1959 it was a Standard Class glider with a 15 m (49 ft 3 in) span. Later aircraft had 16 m (52 ft 6 in) and 18 m (59 ft 1 in) spans but it was the 16 m version that went into series production.

The fuselage of the Orlík is a semi-monocoque of deep oval cross-section, tapering to the tail. The single-seat cockpit, placed just ahead of the wing, is covered by a side-hinged blown canopy. Its tail is conventional with a straight-edged, ply-covered and foam-filled all-moving tailplane, fitted with an anti-balance tab, mounted on top of the fuselage and ahead of the small fin which is constructed in the same way. The fabric-covered, balanced rudder is broad and taller than the fin, reaching down to the keel. Overall, the vertical tail has almost upright straight edges and a blunt tip. The Orlík has a fixed, semi-recessed monowheel ahead of the wing leading edge, assisted by a small tail bumper.

== Operational history ==
25 VT-16 Orlíks were produced in the first series production run, going to Czech gliding clubs. The Orlík also set several new Czech national gliding records during 1962. 15 VT-16s and 48 VT-116s remain on the Czech civil aircraft register in 2010, though some are disassembled.

== Variants ==
VT-16 Orlík
about 25 built.
VT-116 Orlík II
more than 50 built.

== Aircraft on display ==
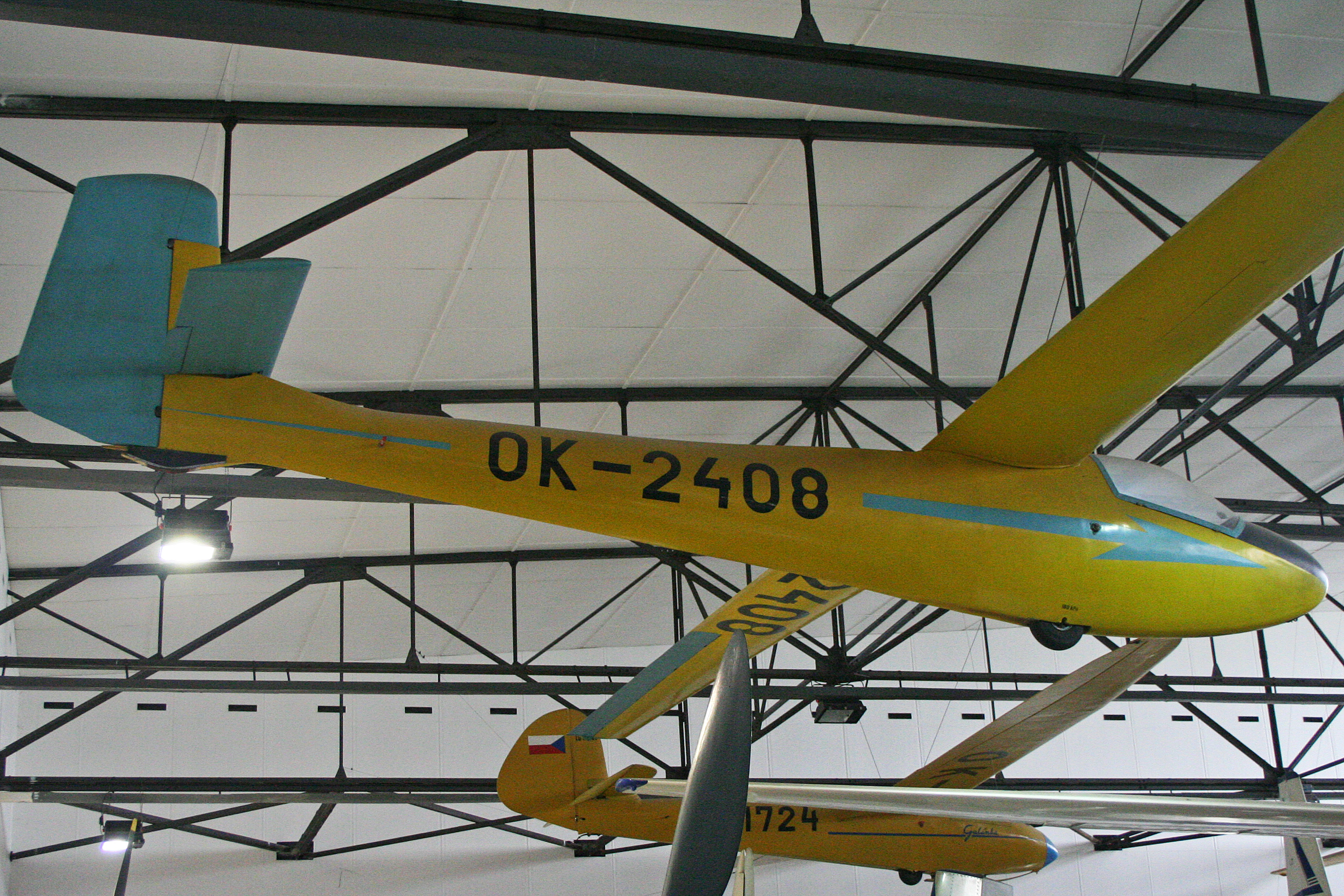
Orlík I on display at the Prague Aviation Museum, Kbely

- Prague Aviation Museum, Kbely: Orlík I OK-2408

== Specifications (VT-16) ==
Data from The World's Sailplanes II, p.62-3

General characteristics

- Crew: one
- Length: 7.40 m (24 ft 3 in)
- Wingspan: 16.0 m (52 ft 6 in)
- Wing area: 12.80 m^{2} (137.8 sq ft)
- Aspect ratio: 20.0
- Airfoil: NACA 64-818
- Empty weight: 215 kg (474 lb)
- Gross weight: 320 kg (705 lb)

Performance

- Maximum speed: 220 km/h (140 mph, 120 kn) placard, smooth air
- Stall speed: 61 km/h (38 mph, 33 kn)
- Maximum glide ratio: 32.5 at 71 km/h (44 mph; 38 kn)
- Rate of sink: 0.56 m/s (110 ft/min) at 63 km/h (39 mph; 34 kn)
- Wing loading: 25.0 kg/m^{2} (5.1 lb/sq ft)

== See also ==
Related development

- Orličan VSO 10 Single-seat glider built in glass-fibre plus aluminium, steel and wood
