= Orličan VSO 10 =

1970s Czechoslovak glider

VSO 10 Gradient
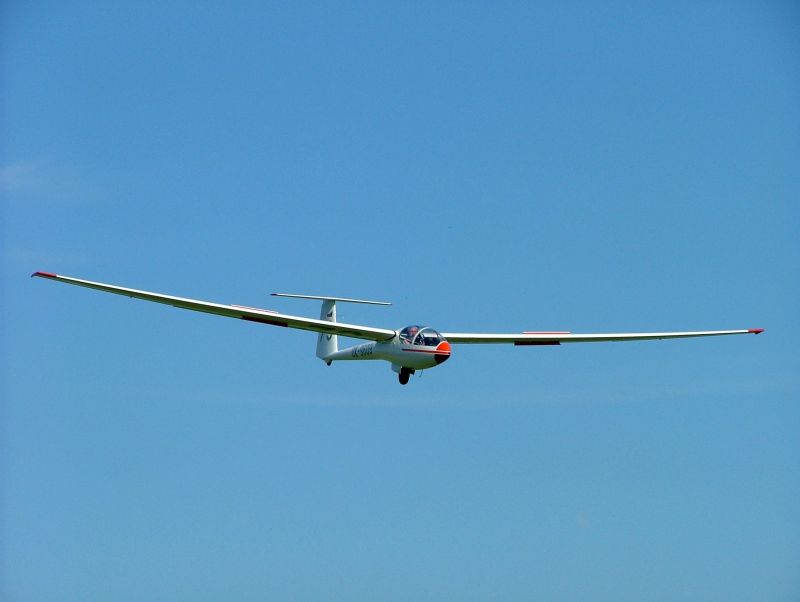
- VSO 10 Gradient

General information
- Type: Club-class sailplane
- Manufacturer: VSO (Vývojová skupina Orličan)
- Number built: 225

History
- Introduction date: 1979
- First flight: 26 October 1976

The VSO 10 Vosa (Vosa – Gradient) is a Standard and Club-Class glider designed and manufactured in the Czechoslovak Republic from December 1978 as a replacement for the VT-116 Orlík II.

== Development ==
Development of the VSO 10 started in 1972 and the first prototype flew on 16 September 1977. The Type Certificate was granted on 15 May 1979, with the first production gliders entering service with Czechoslovak aeroclubs soon after. In 1990 the company ceased production when they started to build Schempp-Hirth gliders. Schempp-Hirth are the current holders of the VSO 10 Type Certificate.

== Design ==
The VSO 10 is a mixed-construction glider with wooden and steel tube structural members, aluminium alloy rear fuselage and glass-fibre sandwich skins. The wings are shoulder-mounted and the tailplane is mounted on top of the integral fin. Conventional control surfaces include all-wooden slotted ailerons, all-metal DFS airbrakes on the upper and lower surfaces of the wing and fabric-covered all-metal elevators and rudder. The undercarriage in the Standard Class aircraft is a manually retractable rubber-sprung monowheel with a drum brake, (non-retractable in the Club-Class aircraft), with a rubber-mounted steel skid under the tail. The pilot is accommodated in a fully reclined seat under a two-piece canopy. Provision is made for 56 L (15 US gal; 12 imp gal) of water ballast to optimise cross-country performance in strong lift conditions.

== Variants ==
VSO 10B Vosa (Gradient)
Retractable landing gear variant
VSO 10C Vosa Club (Gradient Club)
Fixed landing gear variant

== Specifications (VSO 10) ==
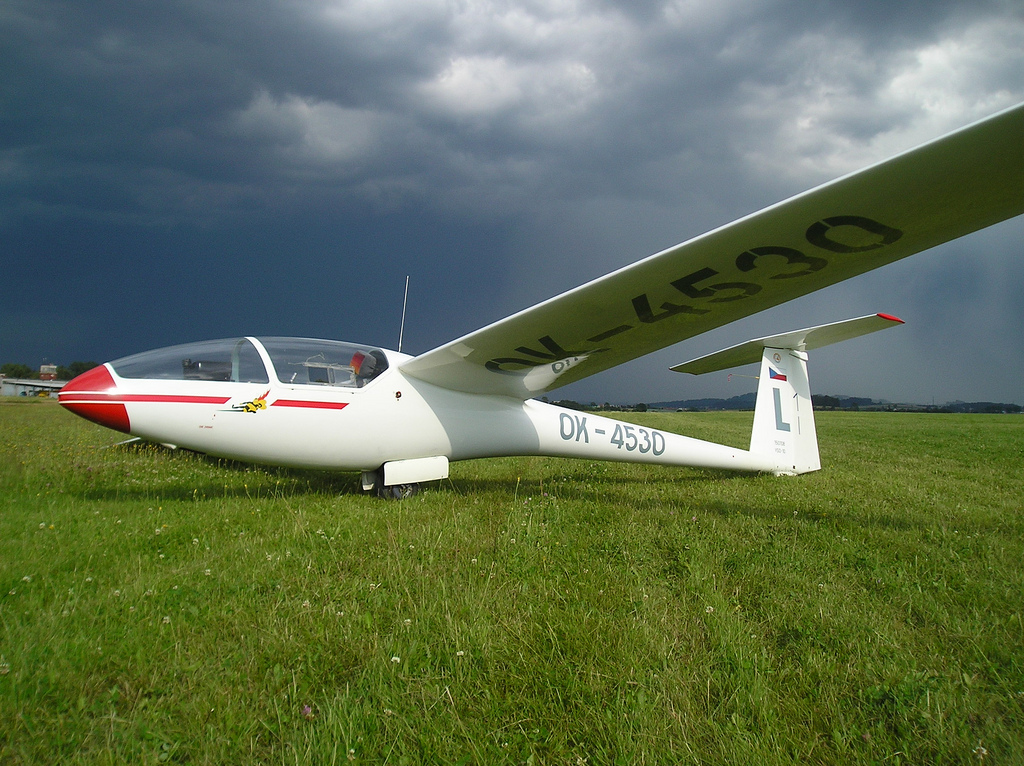
Image of VSO-10B showing the fixed forward segment of its canopy, and the removable rear segment that allows access by the pilot

Data from Jane's All the World's Aircraft 1988–89

General characteristics

- Crew: one
- Length: 7 m (23 ft 0 in)
- Wingspan: 15 m (49 ft 3 in)
- Height: 1.38 m (4 ft 6 in)
- Wing area: 12 m^{2} (130 sq ft)
- Airfoil: root:Wortmann FX-61-163; tip:Wortmann FX-60-126
- Empty weight: 250 kg (551 lb)
- Max takeoff weight: 380 kg (838 lb)

Performance

- Stall speed: 68 km/h (42 mph, 37 kn)
- Never exceed speed: 250 km/h (160 mph, 130 kn) in smooth air

160 km/h (86 kn; 99 mph) in rough air
160 km/h (86 kn; 99 mph) on aero-tow
120 km/h (65 kn; 75 mph) on winch launch

- g limits: +5.3 -3.5
- Maximum glide ratio: 36 at 90 km/h (49 kn; 56 mph)
- Rate of sink: 0.64 m/s (126 ft/min) at 73 km/h (39 kn; 45 mph)
- Wing loading: 31.67 kg/m^{2} (6.49 lb/sq ft) max

== See also ==
Related development

- Orličan VT-16 Orlík Single-seat glider built in wood
