= List of aircraft (J) =

This is a list of aircraft in alphabetical order by manufacturer covering names beginning with 'J'.

== J ==
=== J & J Ultralights ===
(Live Oak, FL)

- J & J Ultralights Tukan
- J & J Ultralights Seawing

=== Jabiru Aircraft ===
- Jabiru J120
- Jabiru J160
- Jabiru J170
- Jabiru J200
- Jabiru J230
- Jabiru J400
- Jabiru J430
- Jabiru J450
- Jabiru LSA
- Jabiru SK
- Jabiru SP
- Jabiru SP-L
- Jabiru ST3
- Jabiru UL
- Jabiru Calypso

=== Jacuzzi ===
((Giocondos) Jacuzzi & Bros, 2043 San Pablo Ave, Berkeley, CA (established by seven brothers to build propellers under military contract).)

- Jacuzzi 1920 Single Seater Monoplane 1
- Jacuzzi 1920 Single Seater Monoplane 2
- Jacuzzi J-7 Reo

=== Jackaroo Aircraft Limited ===
Thruxton, England, United Kingdom

- Thruxton Jackaroo

=== Jackson ===
(Clifford C Jackson, Birmingham and Marysville, MI)

- Jackson O-2

=== Jackson ===
(Jackson Aircraft Corp (A J McCourtie), Reynolds Field, Jackson, MI)

- Jackson B-2

=== Jackson ===
(Dr Lewis A Jackson, Central State Univ, Wilberforce, OH)

- Jackson Versatile I N9666H, tractor propeller, folding parasol wing
- Jackson N8072 1956, pusher propeller, low-wing monoplane with folding wings, experimental, roadable aircraft
- Jackson Concept-7 N569A, high-wing monoplane, pusher propeller
- Jackson J-10 1981, Tractor propeller, low-wing monoplane incorporating wing fittings that allowed for quick removal of the wings for towing the airplane.

=== Jacobs ===
(Multiplane Ltd (fdr: Henry William Jacobs), Atchison. KS)

- Jacobs 1910 Multi-plane

=== Jacobs ===
(Jacobs Aircraft Engine Co, Pottstown. PA 1950: Helicopter Div formed.)

- Jacobs 104 Gyrodyne

=== Jacobs ===
(Eastman N Jacobs, 148 LaSalle Ave, Hampton, VA)

- Jacobs 1929 Monoplane

=== Jacobsen ===
(Arthur Jacobsen, Escanaba, MI)

- Jacobsen Tin Goose

=== Jacobsen ===
(Joe Jacobsen, St Louis, MO)

- Jacobsen Imp

=== Jacquet-Pottier ===
(Robert Jacquet et Jean Pottier)

- Jacquet-Pottier JP-20-90 Impala

=== Jaffe ===
(Jaffe Aircraft Corp, San Antonio, TX)

- Jaffe SA-32T Turbo-Trainer

=== Jameson ===
(Richard J Jameson, Fullerton, CA)

- Jameson RJJ-1 Gipsy Hawk

=== Jamieson ===
(William L Jamieson, Evansville, IN and Richmond, VA)

- Jamieson A
- Jamieson Speed Wing

=== Jamieson ===
(Charles M Jamieson, Wichita, KS 19??: Jamieson Corp (pres: D M Lackey), DeLand, FL)

- Jamieson J-1 Jupiter
- Jamieson J (a.k.a. Take 1)

=== Jamme ===
- Jamme J.5

=== Janney ===
(Janney Aircraft Co)

- Janney 1916 Aeroplane

=== Jannus Aeroplanes ===
((Antony and Rodger) Jannus Aeroplanes, Battery Ave and Hamburg St, Baltimore, MD)

- Jannus 1914 Flying boat
- Jannus 1915 Flying boat

=== Janoir ===
(Ateliers d'Aviation L.Janoir)

- Janoir J-1
- Janoir J-2
- Janoir J-3

=== Janowski ===
(Jarosław Janowski)

- Janowski J-1B Don Kichot
- Janowski J-2 Polonez
- Janowski J-3 Eagle
- Janowski J-5 Marco

=== Jancsó-Szegedy ===
(Endre Jancsó & József Szegedy - built at MSrE)

- Jancsó-Szegedy M-24

=== Japan Aeroplane Manufacturing Works ===
(Nippon Hikoki Seisakusho - Japan Aeroplane Manufacturing Works)

- Suzuki Gyro No.2 Tractor - (Shigeru Suzuki)
- Sakamoto No.6 - (Juichi Sakamoto)
- Umino Seaplane - (Ikunosuke Umino)

=== Japanese Special Attackers ===
- Ta-Go

=== Jarvis ===
(Jarvis Mfg Co, Glendale, CA)

- VJ-21 Jaybird (became Volmer VJ-21)

=== Jason (homebuilt aircraft) ===
- Jason XP-52

=== Javelin ===
(Pasadena Aircraft Corp, Pasadena, CA)

- Javelin Californian

=== Javelin ===
(Javelin Aircraft Co, Wichita, KS)

- Javelin Mullens Phoenix
- Javelin Wichawk
- Javelin T200A
- Javelin V6 STOL

=== Jayhawk ===
(Jayhawk Aircraft Mfg Corp (founders: W D Egolf, D W Eaton), 915 E Lincoln, Wichita, KS)

- Jayhawk Mars 2

=== JBS ===
((Jack B) Stinson School of Aviation, 229 E Baltimore Ave, Detroit, MI)

- JBS Aircoupe (2 seater)
- JBS Aircoupe (1 seater)

=== Jean ===
(Jean Flying Machine Co.)

- Jean 1909 Helicopter

=== Jean-Montet ===
(Phillipe, Pierre & Jean Montet)

- Jean-Montet Quasar 200

=== Jean St-Germain ===
(Centre du Recherches Jean St-Germain)

- Jean St-Germain Raz-mut ultra-light homebuilt

=== Jeannin ===
- Jeannin Taube
- Jeannin Biplane

=== Jeanson-Colliex ===
- Jeanson-Colliex 1913 Hydravion

=== Jeanvoine ===
(Roland Jeanvoine)

- Jeanvoine RJ.01 Roitelet
- Jeanvoine RJ.02 Roitelet
- Jeanvoine RJ.03 Roitelet

=== Jeffair ===
(Jeffair, Renton WA.)

- Jeffair Barracuda

=== Jennings ===
(Jennings Machine Works, Uniontown, PA)

- Jennings RC Junior
- Jennings Sportplane

=== Jensen ===
(Martin Jensen, San Diego CA. 1928: Jensen Aviation Corp, Lehighton, PA 1929: Jensen Aircraft & Marine Corp, Albany, NY 1930: Beckley College, Harrisburg, PA 1936: Jensen Aircraft Corp, James Island Airport, Charleston, SC c.1949: Jensen Helicopter Co Inc (founders: M Jensen & Chandler Hovey), Tonasket, WA)

- Jensen 3-L-W
- Jensen JT-1
- Jensen June Bug
- Jensen Model 21 (evolved into the Lift systems LS-3)
- Jensen Sport trainer

=== Jeof ===
(Jeof srl., Candiana, Italy)

- Jeof Candiana

=== Jero ===
(Pierre de Caters and the Bollekens Brothers)

- Jero N° 9 Antwerpen 1911

=== Jet Pocket ===
(Chantelle, Allier, France)

- Jet Pocket Top 80
- Jet Pocket Top 210
- Jet Pocket Top Must

=== JH ===
(JH Aircraft )

- JH Mini Corsair

=== Jiageng ===
- Jiageng-1

=== Jidey ===
- Jidey J.13 Flash

=== Jihlavan ===
- Jihlavan KP-2U Skyleader
- Jihlavan KP-2U Skyleader 150
- Jihlavan KP-2U Skyleader 200
- Jihlavan Rapid 200FC
- Jihlavan KP-5 Skyleader 500
- Jihlavan Skyleader 600

=== JLB ===
(John L Brown, Momence, IL)

- JLB 1922 Monoplane

=== Jingmen Aviation ===
(Jingmen, China)

- Jingmen A2C Ultra Seaplane

=== Joby ===
(Joby Aviation)

- Joby S4

=== Jodel ===
(Edouard Joly et Jean Délémontez)

- Jodel D.9
- Jodel D.10
- Jodel D.11
- Jodel D.11 Spécial
- Jodel D.18
- Jodel D.19
- Jodel D.20
- Jodel D.91
- Jodel D.92
- Jodel D.97
- Jodel D.111
- Jodel D.112
- Jodel D.113
- Jodel D.114
- Jodel D.115 - D11 with a 75 hp Mathis 4-GF-60 engine, amateur built.
- Jodel D.116 - D11 with a 60 hp Salmson 9ADR engine, amateur built.
- Jodel D.117 - D11 with a 90 hp Continental C90 engine and revised electrics, 223 built by SAN.
- Jodel D.118 - D11 with a 60 hp Walter Mikron II engine, amateur built.
- Jodel D.119
- Jodel D.120
- Jodel D.121 - D11 with a 75 hp Continental A75 engine, amateur built.
- Jodel D.122 - D11 with a 75 hp Praga engine, amateur built.
- Jodel D.123 - D11 with an 85 hp Salmson 5AP.01 engine, amateur built.
- Jodel D.124 - D11 with an 80 hp Salmson 5AQ.01 engine, amateur built.
- Jodel D.125 - D11 with a 90 hp Kaiser engine, amateur built.
- Jodel D.126 - D11 with an 85 hp Continental A85 engine, amateur built.
- Jodel D.127 - D112 with a sliding canopy and DR.100 undercarriage, EAC built.
- Jodel D.128 - D119 with a sliding canopy and DR.100 undercarriage, EAC built.
- Jodel D.140
- Jodel D.150
- Jodel D.185
- Jodel D.195

=== Johansen ===
((Walter E) Johansen Aircraft Co, 4556 W 16 Place, Los Angeles, CA)

- Johansen JA-1
- Johansen JA-2
- Johansen JA-3

=== Johansen ===
- Johansen CAJO 59

=== Johns ===
(American Multiplane Co, Bath, NY / Herbert Johns)

- Johns Multiplane

=== Johns ===
(Alvis R "Ray" Johns, Orrstown and Chambersburg, PA)

- Johns 1934 Monoplane
- Johns Green Demon
- Johns KJ-1 Air Sport
- Johns Tornado J-V
- Johns X-3 Warrior
- Johns Ra-Son Warrior

=== Johnson ===
((Clarence, Harry, Julius, Louis) Johnson Brothers Co, Terre Haute, IN 1908: Johnson Aircraft Building Shop.)

- Johnson 1908 Monoplane
- Johnson 1911 Monoplane

=== Johnson ===
( (E A) Johnson Airplane & Supply Co, Dayton, OH c.1924: Driggs-Johnson Airplane & Supply Co.)

- Johnson Bumblebee (see Driggs-Johnson DJ-1)
- Johnson Canary
- Johnson Twin-60
- Johnson-Hartzell FC-1
- Johnson-Hartzell FC-2

=== Johnson ===
(Clarence M Johnson, Detroit, MI)

- Johnson 1927 Monoplane

=== Johnson ===
(Roy Johnson, Seattle, WA)

- Johnson 1928 Monoplane

=== Johnson ===
(Jesse C Johnson, Milwaukee, WI)

- Johnson-Hamilton 1929 Helicoplane (modified Hamilton H-18)

=== Johnson ===
(Richard B Johnson, 826 S Wabash Ave, Chicago, IL)

- Johnson Uni-Plane

=== Johnson ===
(Bemus Johnson)

- Johnson 1935 moving aerofoil Aeroplane

=== Johnson ===
(Buford E Johnson, Portland, OR)

- Johnson 1935 Monoplane

=== Johnson ===
(Carroll L Johnson, Madison, WI)

- Johnson A

=== Johnson ===
(Laird Aircraft Co & Harold Johnson, Dayton, OH)

- Johnson Special
- Johnson LC-DC

=== Johnson ===
(Robert Johnson, Inglewood, CA)

- Johnson JR-1

=== Johnson ===
((Rufus S "Pop") Johnson.)

- Johnson Bullet (9became the Regent Texas Bullet)
- Johnson Rocket 125
- Johnson Rocket 185 (became the Regent Rocket)

=== Johnson ===
(Luther Johnson, Greenville, NC)

- Johnson 1948 Special
- Johnson 1949 Special

=== Johnson-Funke ===
(Alfred C Johnson and Henry W Funke, Long Beach, CA)

- Johnson-Funke monoplane

=== Johnston ===
(Stanley Johnston, Wallacetown, Ontario)

- Johnston Missing Link
- Johnson 1962 Special

=== Johnston ===
(Richard Johnston, Tucson, AZ)

- Johnston Jeaco 2

=== Johnstown ===
(Johnstown Monoplane Co, Johnstown, PA)

- Johnston Jeaco 2

=== Jojo Wings ===
(Roudnice nad Labem, Czech Republic)

- Jojo Addiction
- Jojo Instinct
- Jojo Quest Bi
- Jojo Speedy
- Jojo Yoki

=== Joly ===
- Motoplaneur Joly

=== Jona ===
(Ing. Alberto Jona Studio Di Consulenza Aeronautica)

- Jona J-6
- Jona J-6S
- Jona J.10bis a.k.a. Magni-Jona J.10bis

=== Jonas ===
(Gerald Jonas, San Francisco, CA)

- Jonas Hummingbird

=== Jones ===
(Harry Martin Jones, Providence, RI and Quincy, MA)

- Jones 1914 Biplane
- Jones 1915 Biplane
- Jones 1916 Biplane

=== Jones ===
(George W. Jones, 924 Camp St, Indianapolis, IN)

- Jones Suicide Buggy#1

=== Jones ===
((Ben) Jones Aircraft Co Inc, Schenectady, NY)

- Jones New Standard D-25
- Jones S-125
- Jones S-150
- Jones monoplane

=== Jones ===
(Howell "Nick" Jones, Augusta, GA)

- Jones Half Fast

=== Jones ===
(L.J.R. Jones, Australia)

- Jones 1930 monoplane

=== Jones ===
(Stanley Jones, 621 Wildwood, Mount Zion, IL)

- Jones 10A

=== Joplin ===
(Joplin Light Aircraft)

- Joplin Tundra
- Joplin 1/2 Tun

=== Jora ===
(Jora Spol s.r.o.)

- Jora Jora

=== Jordan ===
(Linwood F Jordan/20th Century Aerial Navigation Co, Portland, ME)

- Jordan 1914 Triplane Ornithopter

=== Jordanov ===
(Asen Jordanov)

- Jordanov-1

=== Joslin ===
(F A Joslin, Beaufort, SC)

- Joslin Chiisai Tanyoki

=== Joubert ===
(Jean Joubert)

- Joubert J-3

=== Jovanovich ===
(Helicopter Engr Research Corp (pres: D K Jovanovich), Boulevard Airport, Philadelphia, PA (company principals were formerly with Piasecki Co). 1951: Acquired by McCulloch Motors Co. 1957: Jovair Corporation.)

- Jovanovich JOV-1
- Jovanovich JOV-3
- Jovair 4 Sedan
- Jovair J-2

=== Joy ===
((Ervin & Lyle) Joy Aircraft Co, 6359 N Lombard St, Portland, OR)

- Joy J
- Joy JX

=== JPM ===
(Le Mesnil-Esnard, France)

- JPM 01 Médoc
- JPM 02 Anjou
- JPM 03 Loiret
- JPM 03-7 Calva
- JPM 04 Castor
- JPM 05 Trucanou
- JPM 05 Layon
- JPM 06
- JPM 07

=== Julian ===
(Wombat Gyrocopters, St Columb, Cornwall, United Kingdom)

- Julian Wombat

=== Junglas ===
(Vincent J Junglas, Rensselaer, IN)

- Junglas 1935 Monoplane

=== Junkers ===
(Junkers Flugzeug-Werke A.G.)

- Junkers A 20 two-seat multipurpose aircraft based on the J 11
- Junkers A 25 A 20s re-engined with Junkers L2 engines
- Junkers A 32 three-seat multipurpose aircraft
- Junkers A 35 A 20s re-engined with Junkers L5 engines
- Junkers A 48 civil version of K 47
- Junkers A50 Junior sports plane
- Junkers F 13 single-engine, six-seat airliner
- Junkers F 24 single-engine version of G 24
- Junkers G 23 ten-seat trimotor airliner
- Junkers G 24 re-engined G 23 with Junkers L2 engines
- Junkers G 31 11-seat trimotor airliner, improved G 24
- Junkers G 38 large 34-seat, four-engine blended-wing body airliner
- Junkers H 21 initial designation of T 21
- Junkers J 1/E.I experimental monoplane
- Junkers J 2 monoplane fighter
- Junkers J 3 experimental fighter
- Junkers J 4/J.I (J.I Blechesel (Tin Donkey) service designation), observation/liaison aircraft
- Junkers J 5 unbuilt fighter designs
- Junkers J 6 fighter design; sometimes called J 5III
- Junkers J 7 prototype fighter; predecessor of D.I
- Junkers J 8 prototype combat aircraft; predecessor of CL.I
- Junkers J 9/D.I fighter
- Junkers J 10/CL.I ground-attack aircraft
- Junkers J 11/CLS.I floatplane version of CL.I
- Junkers J 12 projected four-seat airliner based on the CL.I; cancelled in favor of the F 13
- Junkers J 14 projected large ten-seat, twin-engine airliner
- Junkers J 15 experimental three-seat high-wing monoplane
- Junkers J 17 projected three-seat airliner, improved K 16
- Junkers J 18 projected naval survey aircraft
- Junkers J 28 two-seat fighter version of J 21; not built
- Junkers J 29 two-seat experimental trainer
- Junkers J 40 planned passenger flying boat version of G 38
- Junkers J 42 unknown; possibly meant for an aborted 1931 project
- Junkers J 44 projected version of the A 35 with a Bristol Jupiter engine
- Junkers J 54 projected A 35 replacement; cancelled to focus on the Ju 52
- Junkers J 55 nothing known
- Junkers J 56 projected K 16 replacement; cancelled to focus on the Ju 52
- Junkers J 57 nothing known
- Junkers J 58 projected F 13/W 34 replacement; cancelled to focus on the Ju 52
- Junkers J 59 nothing known
- Junkers J 1000 1920s trans-Atlantic passenger design
- Junkers JG 1 projected large four-engine airliner
- Junkers K 16 small three-seat airliner
- Junkers K 30 militarized version of G 24
- Junkers K 37 militarized version of S 36
- Junkers K 39 prototype reconnaissance-bomber version of A 32
- Junkers K 43 militarized version of W 34
- Junkers K 45 Swedish-built torpedo bomber version of Ju 52
- Junkers K 47 two-seat fighter
- Junkers K 51 heavy bomber derivative of G 38; built in Japan as the Mitsubishi Ki-20
- Junkers K 53 designation for Swedish-built A 35s
- Junkers K 85 designation for proposed land-based torpedo-bomber for Sweden
- Junkers R 02 designation for Swedish-built A 20s
- Junkers R 42 designation for Swedish-built K 30s
- Junkers S 36 twin-engine mail plane
- Junkers T 19 two/three seat parasol wing aircraft
- Junkers T 21 land-based reconnaissance aircraft
- Junkers T 22 single-seat fighter version of T 21
- Junkers T 23 two-seat experimental trainer
- Junkers T 26 refined version of T 23
- Junkers T 27 T 26D with a Clerget 9Z engine
- Junkers T 29 sales designation for J 29
- Junkers W 33 single-engine transport aircraft
- Junkers W 34 single-engine multipurpose seaplane
- Junkers CL.I ground attack aircraft
- Junkers CLS.I
- Junkers D.I monoplane fighter
- Junkers J.I Blechesel (Tin Donkey), armored sesquiplane
- Junkers R.1
- Junkers PS-4 Soviet designation for locally produced W 33s
- Junkers JuG-1 designation for Soviet conversions of the K 30/R 42
- Junkers TB-2 Soviet military designation for the K 30 (not to be confused with Polikarpov TB-2)
- Junkers KXJ1
- Junkers LXJ1 (Ju86)
- Junkers LXJ1 (Ju160)
- Junkers Navy Experimental Type J Trainer
- Junkers C-79 designation for a single Ju 52 operated by the USAAF
- Junkers Ju 25 projected monoplane bomber for the Soviet Union
- Junkers Ju 46 shipborne catapult-launched seaplane derived from the W 34
- Junkers Ju 49 high-altitude research aircraft
- Junkers Ju 52 Tante Ju; airliner/transport, produced in 1m and 3m versions
- Junkers Ju 60 prototype single-engine, high-speed airliner
- Junkers Ju 85 version of Ju 88 with twin tail
- Junkers Ju 86 twin-engine airliner/bomber
- Junkers Ju 87 Stuka; dive-bomber/ground attack
- Junkers Ju 88 twin-engine multirole combat aircraft
- Junkers Ju 89 prototype four-engine heavy bomber, Ural bomber candidate
- Junkers Ju 90 four-engine airliner/transport based on the Ju 89
- Junkers Ju 147 projected twin-engine, high-altitude bomber; designation is questionable and may not have been used
- Junkers Ju 160 single-engine, high-speed airliner derived from the Ju 60
- Junkers Ju 186
- Junkers Ju 187 erroneous designation for the Ju 287
- Junkers Ju 188 Rächer, medium bomber developed from the Ju 88
- Junkers Ju 248 initial design for the Me 263
- Junkers Ju 252 transport; intended as Ju 52 replacement
- Junkers Ju 268 unmanned bomber component of Mistel V
- Junkers Ju 287 (1943) planned dive bomber/attack aircraft, intended as a Ju 87 replacement
- Junkers Ju 287 (1944) prototype four-engine jet bomber
- Junkers Ju 288 medium bomber developed from the Ju 88
- Junkers Ju 290 large four-engine transport/maritime patrol aircraft developed from the Ju 90
- Junkers Ju 322 Mammut, heavy transport military glider
- Junkers Ju 352 Herkules, transport; version of Ju 252 in mixed construction
- Junkers Ju 388 Störtebeker, multirole aircraft based on the Ju 188
- Junkers Ju 390 long-range derivative of the Ju 290; Amerikabomber candidate
- Junkers Ju 488 proposed four-engine heavy strategic bomber based on the Ju 199
- Junkers Ju 635 simplified version of Do 635

==== Junkers wartime projects ====
- Junkers EF 17 three-seat military aircraft; became the A 32
- Junkers EF 24 single-engine fighter; became the K 47/A 48
- Junkers EF 29 high-altitude research aircraft; became the Ju 49
- Junkers EF 30 single-engine freighter derivative of the G 24
- Junkers EF 31 twin-seat sport aircraft designs; became the A50 Junior
- Junkers EF 34 proposed four-seat, single-engine "flying limousine"
- Junkers EF 37 proposed twin-engine military aircraft driving propellers via driveshafts
- Junkers EF 43 glider transport or glide bomb design
- Junkers EF 48 twin-engine multipurpose military aircraft, development of the K 37
- Junkers EF 49 twin-engine version of Ju 52/1m with remote driven props
- Junkers EF 50 VTOL design study
- Junkers EF 52 proposed torpedo bomber floatplane for Sweden
- Junkers EF 61 prototype twin-engine, high-altitude bomber based on the Ju 49
- Junkers EF 65 combat aircraft; evolved into the EF 82
- Junkers EF 72 early design for EF 77
- Junkers EF 73 medium bomber developed into Ju 288
- Junkers EF 74 Ju 288
- Junkers EF 77 airliner project developed into Ju 252
- Junkers EF 82 combat aircraft, development of the EF 65; intended as an alternative to the Ju 187
- Junkers EF 94 Ju 322
- Junkers EF 100 long-range reconnaissance/bomber developed from the EF 53
- Junkers EF 101 Mistel carrier design
- Junkers EF 109 proposed twin-fuselage fighter-bomber
- Junkers EF 110 ground attack aircraft
- Junkers EF 111 ground attack aircraft
- Junkers EF 112 twin-boom ground attack aircraft
- Junkers EF 116 W-wing jet bomber design
- Junkers EF 122 four-engine development of Ju 287
- Junkers EF 125 two-engine development of Ju 287, precursor of EF 140
- Junkers EF 126 Elli, experimental pulsejet fighter, Miniaturjägerprogramm design candidate
- Junkers EF 127 Walli, rocket-powered fighter, Emergency Fighter Program design candidate
- Junkers EF 128 tailless, swept-wing jet interceptor, Emergency Fighter Program design candidate
- Junkers EF 130 projected flying-wing bomber
- Junkers EF 131 six-engine development of Ju 287, test flown postwar in the Soviet Union
- Junkers EF 132 planned jet bomber
- Junkers EF 140 jet reconnaissance/bomber, completed postwar in the Soviet Union
- Junkers EF 150 jet bomber, Russian designed and completed postwar in the Soviet Union
- Junkers EF with BMW 801
- Junkers EF 2x Jumo 004

=== Junkers-Larsen ===
(Junkers-(John M) Larsen Aircraft Corp, NY)

- Junkers-Larsen JL-6
- Junkers-Larsen JL-12

=== Junkers Profly ===
(Kulmbach, Bayern, Germany)

- Junkers Profly Junkers Trike
- Junkers Profly Ultima
- Junkers Profly Junka UL/

=== Junkers Profly France ===
(Haguenau, France)

- Junkers Profly France Junka UL

=== Junqua ===
(Roger and Jean-Claude Junqua)

- Junqua-Andreazza RJ.02 Volucelle
- Junqua RJ.03 Ibis

=== Jupiter ===
(Kenneth Champion, Gobels, MI)

- Jupiter J-1
- Jupiter K-2

=== Jurca ===
(Marcel Jurca)

- Jurca MJ-1
- Jurca MJ-2 Tempête
- Jurca MJ-3 Dart
- Jurca MJ-4 Shadow
- Jurca MJ-5 Sirocco
- Jurca MJ-6 Crivats
- Jurca MJ-7 Gnatsum 2/3 scale variant
- Jurca MJ-7S Solo Single-seat advanced trainer version of MJ-7
- Jurca MJ-8 1-Nine-0 3/4 scale version of Focke-Wulf Fw 190
- Jurca MJ-9 One-Oh-Nine 3/4 scale version of Messerschmitt Bf 109
- Jurca MJ-10 Spit 3/4 scale version of Supermarine Spitfire
- Jurca MJ-11 Sea Fury
- Jurca MJ-12 Pee-40
- Jurca MJ-14 Fourtouna
- Jurca MJ-15 Delta
- Jurca MJ-16 Vent
- Jurca MJ-20 Tempête
- Jurca MJ-22 Bi-Tempête
- Jurca MJ-23 Orage
- Jurca MJ-50 - metal version (never built)
- Jurca MJ-51 Spérocco ("Special Sirocco")
- Jurca MJ-52 Zéphyr (named for the Zephyr wind) - utility version with converted Volkswagen automotive engine or Continental A65
- Jurca MJ-53 Autan (named for the Autan wind) - version with side-by-side seating - 2 built
- Jurca MJ-54 Silas (not related to the MJ-5 in any way but by number. It is a small transport with side by side seating and a cargo door in the back able to load (very) small vehicles. Reg: F-WGBT)
- Jurca MJ-55 Biso (named for the Biso wind - 1 built)
- Jurca MJ-56 Sirocco S
- Jurca MJ-58
- Jurca MJ-66 Crivats
- Jurca MJ-70 Full-scale variant of MJ-7 (not completed)
- Jurca MJ-77 Gnatsum 3/4 scale variant of MJ-7
- Jurca MJ-80 1-Nine-0 full-scale version of MJ-8
- Jurca MJ-90 One-Oh-Nine full-scale version of MJ-9
- Jurca MJ-100 Spit full-scale version of MJ-10

=== Just ===
- Just Escapade
- Just Highlander
- Just Superstol
