= A2C =

A2C may refer to:

- Jingmen A2C Ultra Seaplane
- Airman Second Class, abbreviated A2C, a rank in the United States Air Force
- Advantage Actor Critic, a reinforcement learning algorithm
