= J15 =

J15 may refer to:

== Vehicles ==
=== Aircraft ===
- Junkers J 15, a German experimental aircraft
- Shenyang J-15, a Chinese carrier-based jet fighter

=== Locomotives ===
- GSR Class J15, an Irish steam locomotive
- LNER Class J15, an English steam locomotive class

=== Ships ===
- INS Investigator (J15), a Sandhayak-class survey ship of the Indian Navy

== Other uses ==
- Bacterial pneumonia
- County Route J15 (California), a County route in Tulare County, California
- Elongated square bipyramid, a Johnson solid (J_{15})
- J15, a Nissan J engine model
