= Menasco Pirate =

Four-cylinder, air-cooled, in-line, inverted aero-engine series

Pirate
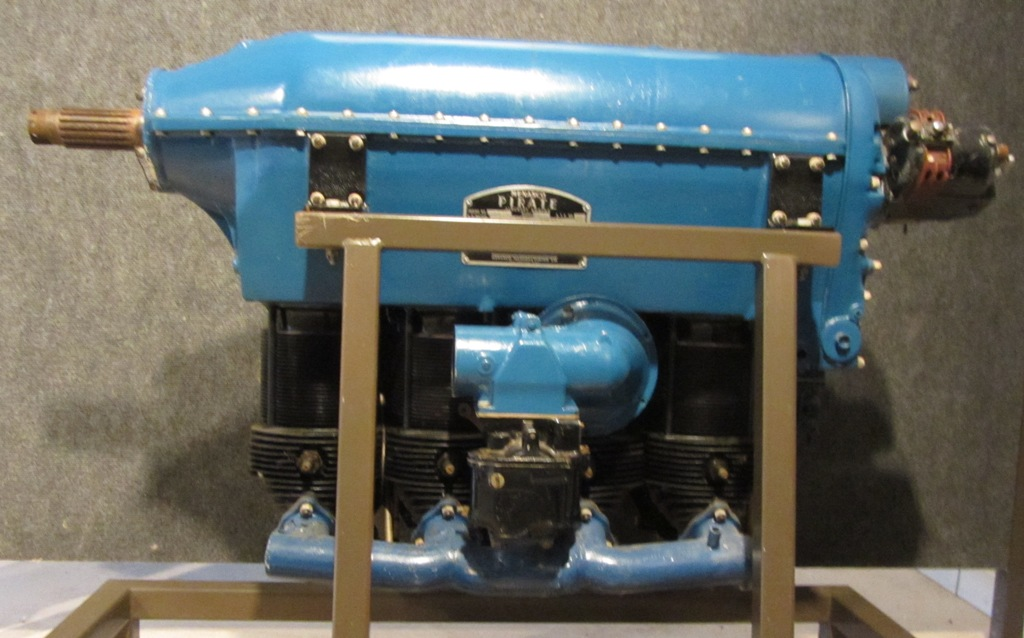
- Type: Piston aero engine
- National origin: United States
- Manufacturer: Menasco Motors Company
- First run: 1930s
- Major applications: Great Lakes 2T-1MS; Ryan ST

The Menasco Pirate series are four-cylinder, air-cooled, in-line, inverted aero-engines, built by the Menasco Motors Company of Burbank, California, for use in light general and sport aircraft during the 1930s and 1940s. The Menasco engines came in both normally aspirated and supercharged forms, with the supercharged models exhibiting superior performance at higher altitudes, with a relatively small increase in dimensions and weight. The supercharged models had the S suffix added to their designation to show supercharging.

== Variants ==
Menasco A-4 Pirate (also listed as Menasco 4A)
90 hp.
Menasco B-4 Pirate
95 hp.
Menasco C-4 Pirate (Military designation L-365)
125 hp. Compression ratio 5.8: 1, dry weight 300 lb
Menasco Pirate C-4S
Super-charged 150 hp.
Menasco D-4 Pirate
125 hp, compression ratio 5.5:1, dry weight 311 lb
Menasco D-4-87 Super Pirate
134 hp, Compression ratio 6:1, dry weight 310 lb
Menasco L-365-1
military designation for the C4-4LA
Menasco L-365-3
similar to -1 but changes to cylinder heads, lubrication and carburettor

== Applications ==
- Argonaut Pirate
- Aeroneer 1-B
- Great Lakes 2T-1MS
- de Havilland Canada DH.82C Menasco Moth (Canada, 136 built)
- Fairchild 22 C7B
- Gee Bee Sportster Model D
- Jones S-125
- Ryan ST
- Stearman-Hammond Y-1
- VEF I-17
- Willoughby Delta 8

== Specifications (Menasco C4S Pirate) ==
=== General characteristics ===
- Type: 4-cylinder, air-cooled, in-line, inverted engine
- Bore: 4.75 in (120.65 mm)
- Stroke: 5.125 in (130.18 mm)
- Displacement: 363.27 cu in (5.95 L)
- Length: 47.5 in (1,206 mm)
- Width: 17.7 in (449 mm)
- Height: 28.5 in (724 mm)
- Dry weight: 299 lb (135 kg)

=== Components ===
- Valvetrain: 1 inlet and 1 exhaust valve per cylinder
- Fuel system: 1 Stromberg Carburetor
- Fuel type: 73 octane
- Cooling system: Air

=== Performance ===
- Power output: 150 hp at 2,260 RPM max/112hp at 2,025 RPM cruise
- Compression ratio: 5.5:1
- Power-to-weight ratio: 0.37hp/lb at cruise

== See also ==
Comparable engines

- Alfa Romeo 110
- Argus As 8
- Blackburn Cirrus Major
- de Havilland Gipsy Major
- Elizalde Tigre IV
- Hirth HM 504

Related lists

- List of aircraft engines
