= Stearman-Hammond Y-1 =

1930s American utility monoplane

Y-1
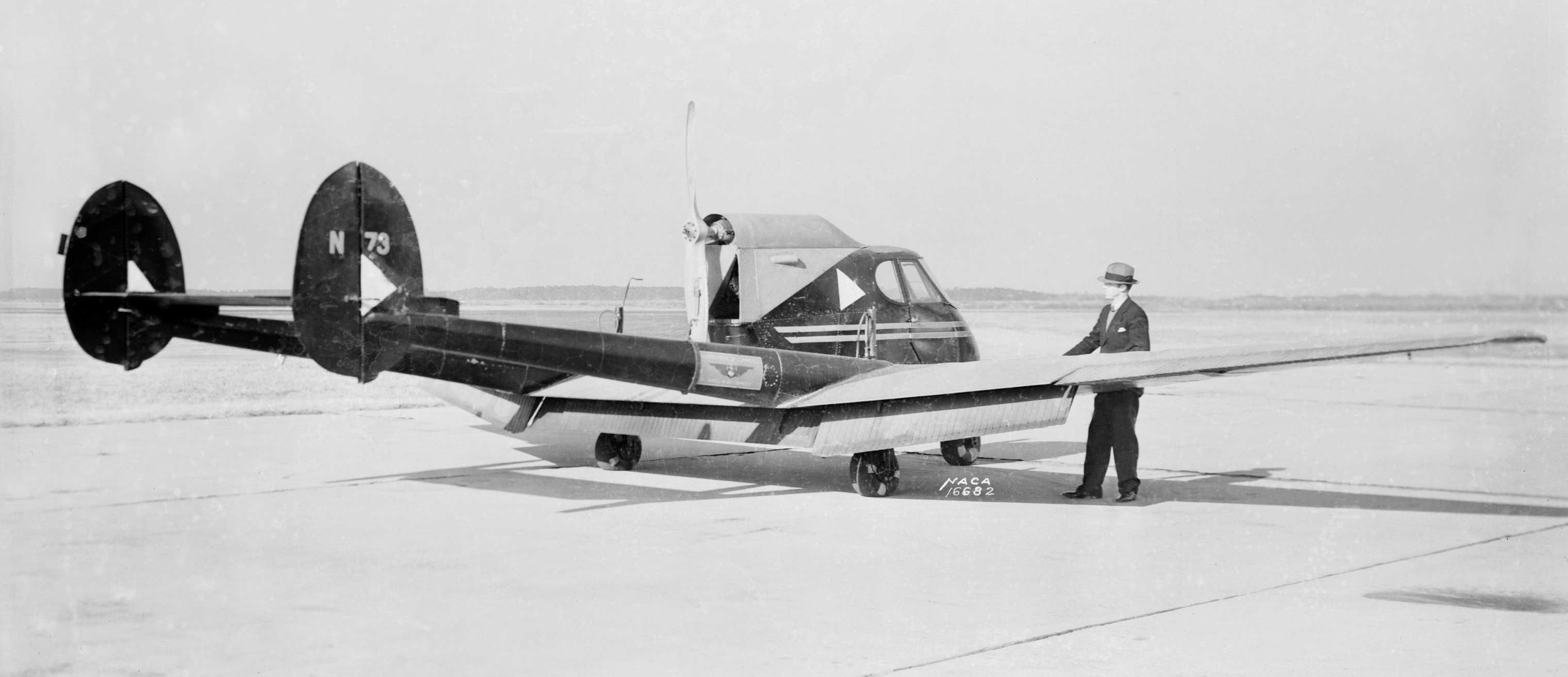

General information
- Type: Utility monoplane
- National origin: United States
- Manufacturer: Stearman-Hammond Aircraft Corporation
- Designer: Dean B. Hammond
- Number built: approx 20

The Stearman-Hammond Y-1 is a 1930s American utility monoplane built by the Stearman-Hammond Aircraft Corporation and evaluated by the United States Navy and the British Royal Air Force.

== Development ==
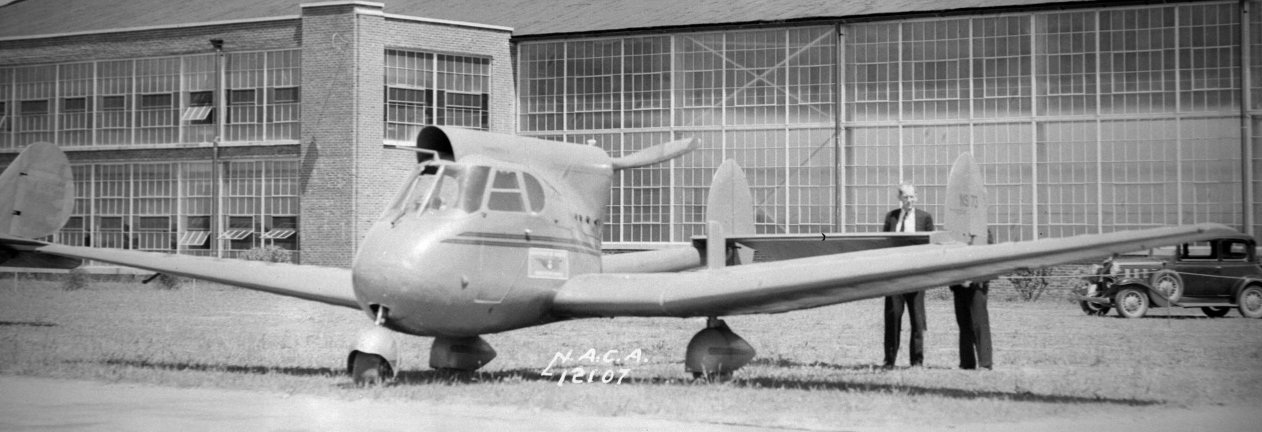
Y-1 testing at Langley

In the early 1930s Dean Hammond designed the Hammond Model Y, a low-wing monoplane twin-boom pusher monoplane. Hammond cooperated with the aircraft designer Lloyd Stearman to develop the type for production. They formed the Stearman-Hammond Aircraft Corporation in 1936 to build the aircraft as the Stearman-Hammond Y-1. The first aircraft was powered by a 125 hp (93 kW) Menasco C-4 piston engine driving a pusher propeller. The performance was not impressive so it was re-engined with a 150 hp (112 kW) Menasco C-4S and re-named the Y-1S. Although designed to be easy to fly the high price meant only 20 aircraft were produced. The aircraft had no rudder as such, the tailplane fins being adjustable but fixed in flight. Turning was by differential aileron and elevator alone.

== Operational history ==
Amelia Earhart in a Stearman Hammond Y-1 with the US Department of Commerce's Bureau of Air Commerce mark

In 1934 the Bureau of Air Commerce held a competition for a safe and practical $700 aircraft. In 1936 the winner of the competition was the Stearman-Hammond Y-1, incorporating many of the safety features of the Ercoupe W-1. Two other winners were the Waterman Aeroplane and a roadable autogyro from the Autogiro Company of America, the AC-35. Twenty-five examples were ordered by the bureau at a price of $3,190 each. The first delivery was considered unacceptable in finish, prompting the production of the re-engineered Y-S model.

Two Y-1S, serial numbers 0908 and 0909, were used for radio controlled development trials by the United States Navy as the JH-1. A successful unmanned radio-controlled flight was made with a JH-1 drone on 23 December 1937 at the Coast Guard Air Station, Cape May, N.J. Take-off and landing was controlled via a land based radio set; for flight maneuvers, control was shifted to an airborne TG-2. KLM purchased a Y-1 (PH-APY) for use in training their pilots in tricycle undercarriage. The Royal Air Force also evaluated a former KLM Y-1S in the 1940s.

== Variants ==
Hammond Model Y
Prototype for the 1934 Bureau of Air Commerce safe airplane competition.
Stearman-Hammond Y-1
Prototype aircraft with a 125hp (93kW) Menasco C-4 engine.
Stearman-Hammond Y-1S
Production aircraft with a 150hp (112kW) Menasco C-4S engine.
JH-1
United States Navy designation for two Y-1S used for tests.

== Operators ==
Netherlands
KLM
United Kingdom

- Royal Air Force

United States

- United States Navy

== Aircraft on display ==
- NC15521, a Y-1S at the Netherlands Transport Museum, Nieuw Vennep, The Netherlands.
- NC15522, a Y-1S at the Hiller Aviation Museum, San Carlos, California, United States.

== Specifications (Y-1S) ==
Data from Smithsonian Institution's National Air and Space Museum

General characteristics

- Crew: 1
- Capacity: 1
- Length: 26 ft 11 in (8.20 m)
- Wingspan: 40 ft 0 in (12.19 m)
- Height: 7 ft 7 in (2.31 m)
- Empty weight: 1,400 lb (635 kg)
- Gross weight: 2,150 lb (975 kg)
- Powerplant: 1 × Menasco C-4S piston engine, 150 hp (110 kW)

Performance

- Maximum speed: 110 kn (130 mph, 210 km/h) at 3000 ft (915 m)

== See also ==
- List of United States Navy aircraft designations (pre-1962)
- Amelia Earhart
