= Junkers J 15 =

J 15

General information
- Type: Experimental passenger aircraft
- National origin: Germany
- Manufacturer: Junkers Flugzeug Werke AG
- Number built: 1

History
- First flight: Early 1921
- Variant: Junkers J 16

The Junkers J 15 was an all-metal monoplane built in Germany in 1920 to explore the design parameters of small single-engined passenger transports. In particular, it could fly in either high or low wing configurations. It led to the Junkers J 16 light airliner.

== Design and development ==
With the exception of the J 4 biplane, all Junkers aircraft were monoplanes and all those built before 1920 were low-wing aircraft. Junkers had been successful with their four-passenger J 13 and believed there was a market for a smaller aircraft carrying just two passengers and using a smaller engine than the J 13. The J 15 was built to optimise the low power, small aircraft configuration and in particular to provide data on whether it should have a high or low wing.

The Junkers J 15 was a single-engined cantilever winged monoplane with an all-metal structure of Duralumin tubing skinned with corrugated Duralumin, a method used in all previous Junkers aircraft from the J 9 onwards. It was first flown with a low-set wing with the high thickness-chord ratio typical of Junkers. The wing was only slightly tapered and blunt tipped, with short, wide chord ailerons at the wing tips which curved out behind the trailing edge proper. When reconfigured as a high wing machine, the wing was attached just above the fuselage by short struts.

The fuselage was deep, giving the J 15 a tubby look, with the two passengers in a windowed internal cabin above the wing. The pilot sat well behind them and clear of the trailing edge of the wing, in an open cockpit. The tailplane was mounted on the top of the fuselage and a small triangular fin carried a rudder that extended down to the bottom of the fuselage, moving in a cut-out between the elevators. The J 15 was powered by a 158 hp (118 kW) upright inline Mercedes D.IIIa engine driving a four-blade propeller. The fixed main undercarriage had a pair of main wheels each mounted on V-legs splayed out from the fuselage bottom and interconnected by linked axles braced by a pair of centre line struts.

The sole J 15 was complete by the autumn of 1920, but was moved to the Netherlands for its first flight in early 1921 to avoid the restrictions on German aircraft production imposed by the Allies after their victory in World War I. After flying as a low-wing monoplane the wing was moved to the high position and the low fuselage wing roots skinned over with corrugated Duralumin, leaving the profile visible. The high wing configuration was judged superior and adopted for the larger and heavier J 16 production two passenger machine. The J 16 was also influenced by the J 15 trials in having a cockpit immediately ahead of the wings, as the take off view from the mid fuselage cockpit of the latter was poor with high set wings, and by the addition of aerodynamic balances to elevators and rudder.

== Specifications ==
Data from Kay 2004 p.40

General characteristics

- Crew: 1
- Capacity: 2 passengers
- Length: 8.00 m (26 ft 3 in)
- Wingspan: 11.00 m (36 ft 1 in)
- Wing area: 17.0 m^{2} (183 sq ft)
- Empty weight: 430 kg (948 lb)
- Gross weight: 712 kg (1,570 lb)
- Powerplant: 1 × Mercedes D.IIIa 6-cylinder upright water-cooled inline

Performance

- Maximum speed: 145 km/h (90 mph, 78 kn)
- Range: 700 km (430 mi, 380 nmi)
