= Jones S-125 =

U.S. Two-seat sport aircraft

General information
- Type: Two seat sports
- National origin: U.S.
- Manufacturer: Ben Jones, Inc
- Number built: 1

History
- First flight: early 1937

The Jones S-125 was a U.S. two-seat sport aircraft intended for large-scale production, though only one was completed.

== Design and development ==
The Jones S-125 was a tidily presented, two-seat low-wing monoplane largely constructed from wood and with fabric covering. It was to have been offered with a choice of two modern, inverted inline engines, one a supercharged version of the other.

The wings were built around two box-spars, with roots carefully faired into the fuselage. Beyond the roots the wing plan was trapezoidal out to rounded tips. The wings had significant dihedral, particularly on the lower surfaces. Modified Frise ailerons occupied about 70% of the trailing edges.

Its 125 hp (93 kW) Menasco C-4 or a 150 hp (110 kW) supercharged relative, the C-4S, were four-cylinder, air-cooled, inverted in-line engines, mounted on detachable, rubber-damped frames with fuel tanks in the wings. Aft, the cockpit seated two in tandem over the wing under a sliding, three-part, tunnel-type canopy. Normally the S-125 was flown from the rear seat, though the forward one was equipped for dual control. Its tail was conventional, with a roughly triangular tailplane on top of the fuselage. Its elevators had rounded tips, cut-outs for rudder movement and an internally adjustable trim tab port side. The fin had a blunted, cropped triangular profile and the rudder, which reached down to the keel, was largely straight-edged. Unlike most of the S-125's structure, the rear control surfaces were dural-framed.

The S-125's landing gear was conventional, with a pair of independent, shock-absorbing legs fixed to the wing spars and carrying the landing wheels on short axles at their inverted Y-form ends. Forward-reaching trouser fairings from the wing underside came almost to the ground, showing less than half the wheels; these had brakes that were foot-operated from the edges of the rudder pedals, allowing independent or collective use of brakes and rudder on the ground. The tailwheel was steel-sprung, pneumatically damped and could freely swivel through 360°.

== Operational history ==
The date of the S-125's first flight in early 1937 is not known exactly but it ended in a crash which left it badly damaged. After that, the assets of Ben Jones, Inc. moved between several companies until the aircraft was rebuilt as the White S-125. Nothing more is known of it.

== Variants ==
S-125
125 hp (93 kW) C4 engine
S-150
150 hp (110 kW) C4S supercharged engine. Not flown.

== Specifications (S-125) ==
Data from

General characteristics

- Crew: one
- Capacity: one passenger/pupil
- Length: 24 ft 2 in (7.37 m)
- Wingspan: 31 ft (9.4 m)
- Height: 7 ft 3 in (2.21 m)
- Wing area: 140.5 sq ft (13.05 m^{2})
- Aspect ratio: 6.8
- Empty weight: 1,125 lb (510 kg)
- Gross weight: 2,000 lb (907 kg)
- Fuel capacity: 46 US gal (38 imp gal; 170 L)
- Powerplant: 1 × Menasco C4 four-cylinder, air-cooled, inverted in-line, normally aspirated, 125 hp (93 kW)
- Propellers: 2-bladed

Performance

- Maximum speed: 151 mph (243 km/h, 131 kn)
- Cruise speed: 136 mph (219 km/h, 118 kn)
- Take-off run 390 ft (120 m)
- Landing speed: 46 mph (74 km/h; 40 kn)
- Range: 730 mi (1,170 km, 630 nmi)
- Service ceiling: 14,000 ft (4,300 m)
- Rate of climb: 1,020 ft/min (5.2 m/s)
