= Jeof Candiana =

Italian homebuilt aircraft

General information
- Type: Homebuilt aircraft
- National origin: Italy
- Manufacturer: Jeof srl
- Status: Production completed
- Number built: at least ten

History
- Introduction date: mid-1990s

The Jeof Candiana (named for the town of its origin) is an Italian homebuilt aircraft that was designed and produced by Jeof srl of Candiana, introduced in the mid-1990s. When it was available the aircraft was supplied as a kit for amateur construction.

== Design and development ==
The Candiana features a strut-braced high-wing, a two-seats-in-side-by-side configuration enclosed cabin accessed via doors, fixed conventional landing gear and a single engine in tractor configuration. Tricycle landing gear is optional.

The aircraft is made from a combination of welded steel tubing and aluminum. The aircraft was designed as a testbed for the Sax 86 engine, a derivative of the Fiat Fire four-cylinder four-stroke automotive powerplant.

The standard day, sea level, no wind, takeoff and landing roll is 100 m (328 ft).

== Operational history ==
By 1998 the company reported that ten kits had been sold, were completed and flying.

== Specifications (Candiana) ==
Data from AeroCrafter

General characteristics

- Crew: one
- Capacity: one passenger
- Length: 6.7 m (21.9 ft)
- Wingspan: 8.7 m (28.4 ft)
- Empty weight: 282 kg (622 lb)
- Powerplant: 1 × Sax 86 four cylinder four stroke automotive conversion engine
- Propellers: 2-bladed fixed pitch

Performance

- Maximum speed: 210 km/h (130 mph, 110 kn)
- Cruise speed: 171 km/h (106 mph, 92 kn)
- Stall speed: 63 km/h (39 mph, 34 kn)
- Range: 900 km (560 mi, 490 nmi)
