= Regent Rocket =

The Regent Rocket was a five place, tricycle-gear, all-metal airplane designed by R. S. "Pop" Johnson, designer of the Swift, Johnson Rocket and Texas Bullet.

After losing control of the Texas Bullet program, "Pop" Johnson found investors in Henderson, Texas and formed the Regent Aircraft Corporation to build a new design. One investor was Vess Taylor, whose father, S. J. Taylor, had been an investor in Aircraft Manufacturing Company which built the Texas Bullet. J. Mitrovich was chief engineer. The Regent Rocket was slighter larger than the Texas Bullet and powered by a 260 hp Lycoming GSO-435 engine.

First flight was in April 1951 at the Rusk County Airport in Henderson, Texas. On July 1, 1952, all assets of Regent Aircraft Corporation were turned over to Regent Aircraft Inc. of Houston, Texas. Over the next three years, Regent Aircraft moved successively to Pearland, Edinburg and finally McAllen, Texas. Installation of a 400 hp Lycoming engine was proposed but never accomplished. On October 18, 1955, the flying prototype was sold at a sheriff's auction to Dean Porter of Brownsville, Texas. An unfinished airframe was behind the hangar of a fixed-base operator (Upper Valley Aviation which was located across Runway 360 from McCreery Aviation) in McAllen, Texas for many years and was reported to have later gone to Minnesota. This unfinished Regent resurfaced in 2017. The flying prototype was destroyed by fire in the 1960s after a forced landing on a highway near Deming, New Mexico by the current owner, Dick Carroll, following an engine failure.

Johnson later attempted to develop an updated version of the Regent Rocket in Lafayette, Louisiana as the Johnson 260.

== Specs ==
- Span 30 ft. 6 in.
- Length 26 ft. 3 in.
- Gross Weight 2900 lb.
