= Joplin Tundra =

CzechCanadian ultralight aircraft

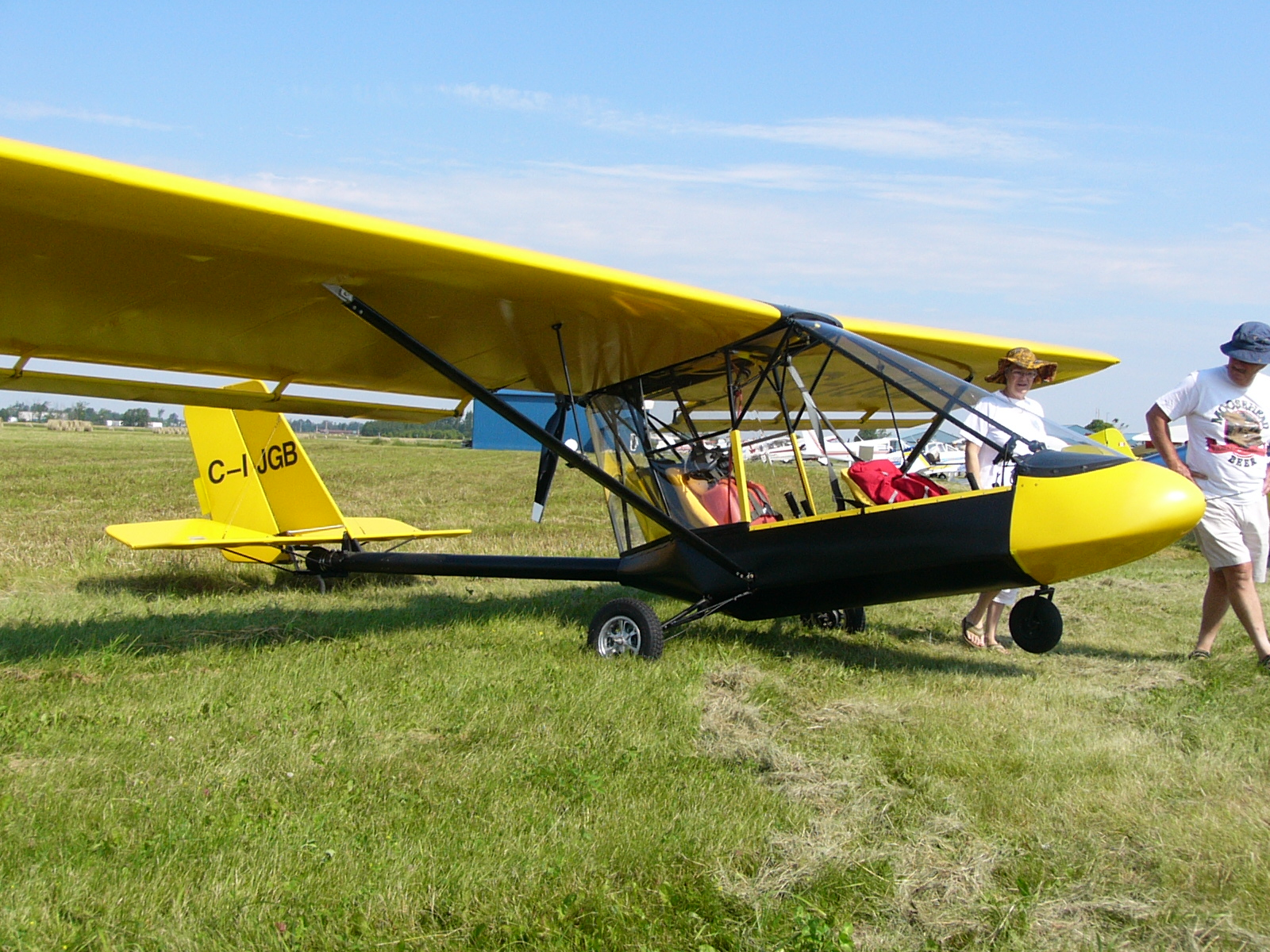
- Back Forty Tundra

General information
- Type: Ultralight aircraft
- National origin: United States
- Manufacturer: Back Forty Developments; Joplin Light Aircraft; Laron Aviation
- Status: No longer in production

The Joplin Tundra is a family of Canadian, high-wing, strut-braced, pusher configuration ultralight aircraft that was originally produced by Back Forty Developments of Campbellford, Ontario, Canada and later by Joplin Light Aircraft of Joplin, Missouri and Laron Aviation of Borger, Texas for amateur construction. The aircraft is out of production.

== Design and development ==
The initial model of the Tundra family was the two-seats-in-tandem tricycle gear Tundra for the US ultralight trainer, homebuilt and European FAI microlight categories. The aircraft features a semi-enclosed cockpit with optional doors and can be fitted with skis or floats.

The Tundra is built from a welded steel cockpit cage with a fibreglass fairing. The tailboom, tail group and wings are of aluminium construction, with the wings and tail surfaces covered in doped aircraft fabric. The wing incorporates a D-cell, Junkers-style ailerons and a single strut layout.

The standard engine is the 50 hp (37 kW) Rotax 503 twin-cylinder, two-stroke aircraft engine, with the liquid-cooled 74 hp (55 kW) Rotax 618, 64 hp (48 kW) Rotax 582, 65 hp (48 kW) Hirth 2706 or the 64 hp (48 kW) SuziAir three-cylinder engines optional. Reported construction time for the two-seater is 250 hours.

The two-seater Tundra was later developed into a conventional landing gear single-seat ultralight for the US FAR 103 Ultralight Vehicles category, including meeting the category's stringent 254 lb (115 kg) empty weight limit. The resulting aircraft was introduced in 1997 and was designated the 1/2 Tun indicating it was "half a Tundra". This version had the wingspan reduced from the two-seater's 32 ft (9.8 m) to 26 ft (7.9 m). The cockpit steel tube structure was also reduced, along with the cockpit fairing and the fuel tank was changed to 5 US gal (19 L) capacity, from the two-seater's 10 US gal (38 L) tank. Reported construction time for the 1/2 Tun is also 250 hours. The 1/2 Tun's standard engine is the 40 hp (30 kW) Rotax 447 twin-cylinder, two-stroke aircraft engine.

== Variants ==
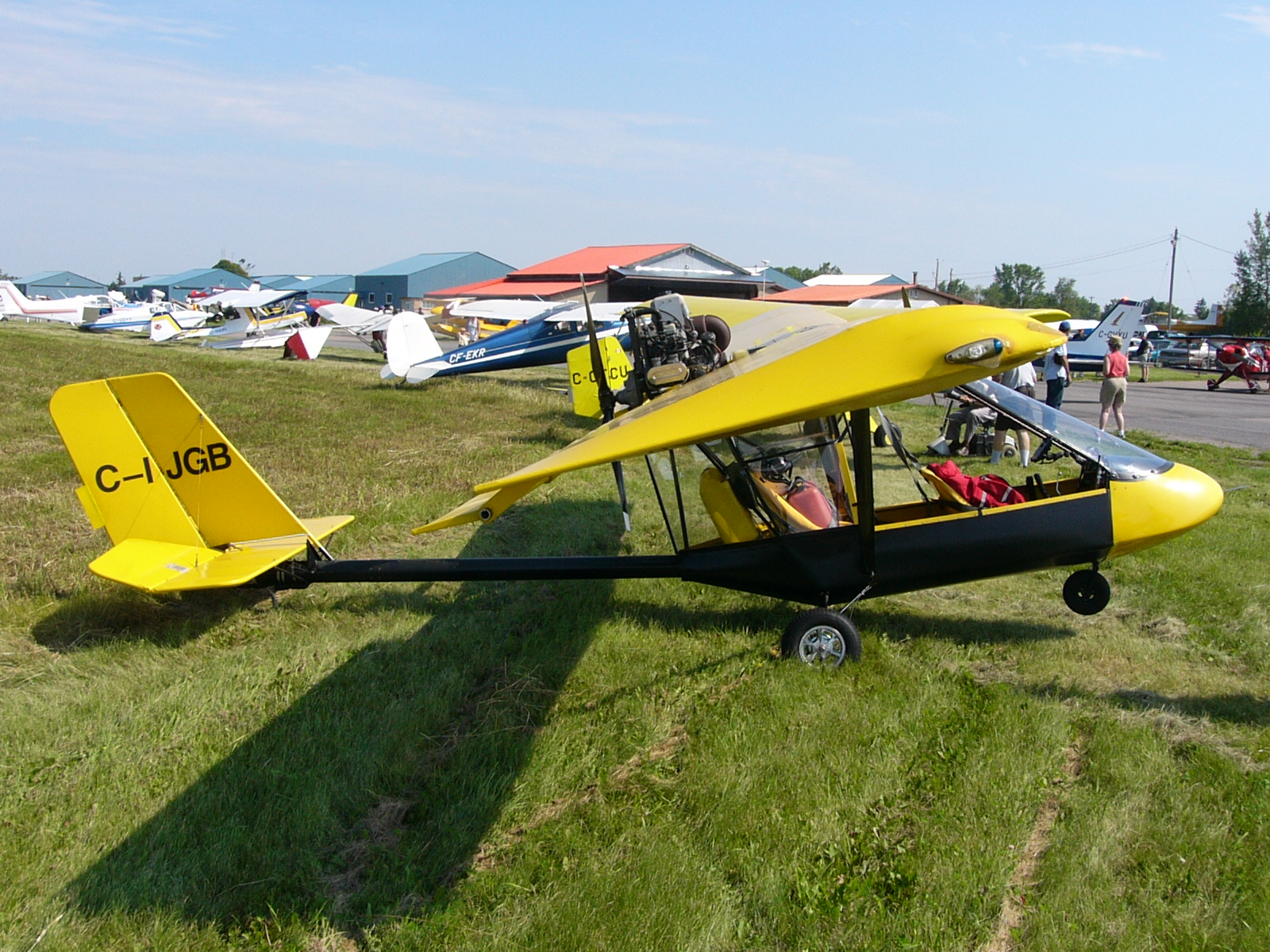
A Back Forty Developments Tundra

Tundra
Two-seat model with tricycle landing gear and a 32 ft (9.8 m) wingspan. Fifteen were reported flying in 1998.
1/2 Tun
Single-seat model with conventional landing gear and a 26 ft (7.9 m) wingspan.

== Specifications (1/2 Tun) ==
Data from Cliche

General characteristics

- Crew: one
- Wingspan: 26 ft 0 in (7.92 m)
- Empty weight: 250 lb (113 kg)
- Gross weight: 550 lb (249 kg)
- Fuel capacity: 5 US gallons (19 litres)
- Powerplant: 1 × Rotax 447 , 40 hp (30 kW)
- Propellers: 2-bladed ground adjustable

Performance

- Maximum speed: 63 mph (101 km/h, 55 kn)
- Cruise speed: 55 mph (89 km/h, 48 kn)
- Stall speed: 25 mph (40 km/h, 22 kn)
- Range: 165 mi (266 km, 143 nmi)
- Service ceiling: 10,000 ft (3,000 m)
- Rate of climb: 1,000 ft/min (5.1 m/s)

== See also ==
Aircraft of comparable role, configuration, and era

- Spectrum Beaver
