= Johns Ra-Son Warrior =

Ra-Son Warrior

General information
- Type: Bushplane
- National origin: United States of America
- Designer: Alvis R. Johns

History
- Introduction date: 1947

The Ra-Son Warrior or X-3 Warrior is a low wing bushplane with a large short coupled tail surface.

== Design ==
The aircraft has a large tapered low wing, with a large horizontal tail surface mounted close to the trailing edge of the wing and conventional tailwheel landing gear. The fuselage has welded steel tube construction with fabric covering. The wings have fabric-covered wooden ribs and spars. A 1,000 lb (454 kg) payload can be lifted by the 185 hp (138 kW) engine. The five-seat cabin can be converted for cargo operations, and two oversized gullwing cabin doors allow loading.

== Operational history ==
The prototype was built over a four-year period. The aircraft received the Experimental Aircraft Association award for achievement in 1963.

== Specifications (Ra-Son Warrior) ==
Data from Sport Aviation

General characteristics

- Capacity: five
- Length: 22 ft 3 in (6.78 m)
- Wingspan: 38 ft (12 m)
- Empty weight: 1,820 lb (826 kg)
- Gross weight: 3,450 lb (1,565 kg)
- Fuel capacity: 45 gal (170 litres)
- Powerplant: 1 × Lycoming O-435-1 , 185 hp (138 kW)

Performance

- Maximum speed: 120 kn (140 mph, 230 km/h)
- Cruise speed: 103 kn (118 mph, 190 km/h)
- Stall speed: 36 kn (42 mph, 68 km/h)
- Rate of climb: 1,000 ft/min (5.1 m/s)
