= Jabiru LSA =

1990s Australian light aircraft

LSA
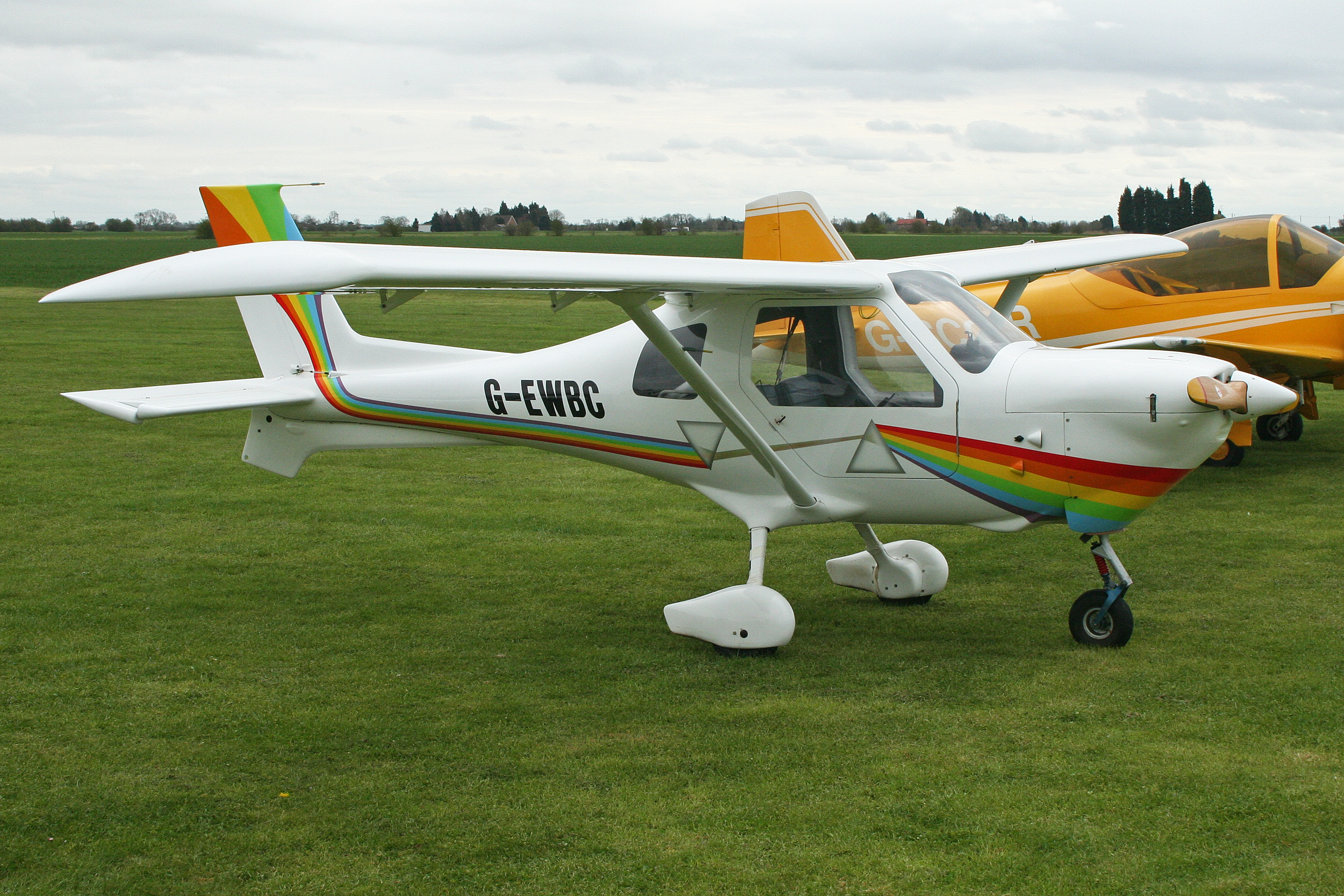
- A UK-registered Jabiru SK, G-EWBC

General information
- Type: Light aircraft
- National origin: Australia
- Manufacturer: Jabiru Aircraft

History
- First flight: 1989

The Jabiru LSA is a light aircraft developed in Australia in the early 1980s and marketed in the early 1990s. Jabiru also sold many variants of the LSA design to meet with different Australian and international certification requirements, including complete, factory-built aircraft and kits for amateur construction. The LSA itself was designed to meet with Australian ultralight regulations under the then-current CAO 101.55 for factory-built ultralights.

== Design ==
The LSA is a strut-braced, high-wing monoplane of conventional design. The pilot and a single passenger sit side-by-side in a fully enclosed cabin. It is powered by a piston engine in the nose driving a tractor-mounted propeller. The LSA itself and most of its variants have fixed, tricycle undercarriage, although one variant, the SP-T, had tailwheel undercarriage. The wings are detachable for transportation and storage.

Construction is of GFRP throughout, except for metal wing struts and engine mounts.

== Development ==
Design work on the LSA in 1987. Early the following year, the Avtech company was founded to develop it, and construction of the first prototype began. In 1989, the Jabiru Aircraft company was founded, and the first of two prototypes flew. CAO 101.55 certification was gained on 1 October 1991, and at the time, US primary sports plane and Canadian TP 1014E certification was expected by 1995.

The LSA was originally tested and certified with the 48-kilowatt (64 hp) Rotax 582 two-cylinder, two-stroke engine. In 1990, a third prototype, registration VH-LIP) was tested with the 45-kilowatt (60 hp) IAME KFM 112M engine instead. The first 21 production aircraft were all delivered with this engine. However, manufacturer IAME discontinued production of this engine, leading Jabiru to start designing and manufacturing their own engines for their aircraft.

== Variants ==
LSA
Original, factory-built ultralight version
ST-3
Identical to the LSA but manufactured to meet requirements for general registration. First produced 1994.
SK
Kit version of the LSA. Jabiru supplied everything except paint, upholstery, and radio. First flown 1995, and approvals for New Zealand, South Korea, the UK, and the USA were obtained in 1996.
UL
Version of the SK developed to meet European microlight regulations, which required a maximum takeoff weight of 450 kilograms (990 lb) and stall speed of 65 kilometres per hour (40 mph; 35 kn). Jabiru achieved this by adding 1.372 metres (4 ft 6.0 in) to the SK's wingspan and 0.610 metres (2 ft 0 in) to the length of its tail boom. Its ventral fin was scaled down, and its flaps were extended by 1.830 metres (6 ft 0 in). It is powered by a 60-kilowatt (80 hp) Jabiru 2200 engine and has a cruise speed of 185 km/h (115 mph)
Calypso
Version of the UL only marketed in Canada, the UK, and the US, available with either a 4-cylinder of 6-cylinder engine.
SP
Version developed for export to countries whose aviation authorities required a 39 knots (72 km/h; 45 mph) stall speed, including Canada, Chile, and South Africa. This was achieved by combining the standard-size wings of the SK with the longer fuselage of the UL. Also marketed in the US, it is powered by an 80-kilowatt (110 hp) Jabiru 3300 engine and has a cruise speed of 213 km/h (132 mph)
SP-T
Tail-wheel version of the SP. The SP-T had its main undercarriage moved forward, and was equipped with a larger rudder and toe brakes for differential braking. The changed undercarriage improved the aircraft's ability to operate from rough airfields.
J120
Factory-built version of the SP intended as a low-cost personal aircraft.

== Operators ==
Other than private owners, several aero clubs were early buyers of the certificated ST version, including the Townsville Aero Club (which bought the very first ST), the North Queensland Aero Club, and the Royal Aero Club of Western Australia. Southern Skies Aviation was an early flight training school customer.

== Specifications (LSA, with Jabiru 1600 engine) ==
Data from Jackson 1995, p.8

General characteristics

- Crew: one pilot
- Capacity: 1 passenger
- Length: 5.00 m (16 ft 5 in)
- Wingspan: 8.03 m (26 ft 4 in)
- Height: 2.01 m (6 ft 7 in)
- Wing area: 7.90 m^{2} (85.0 sq ft)
- Empty weight: 235 kg (518 lb)
- Max takeoff weight: 430 kg (948 lb)
- Powerplant: 1 × Jabiru 1600 four-cylinder, horizontally-opposed, air-cooled, piston engine, 44.7 kW (59.9 hp)

Performance

- Maximum speed: 182 km/h (113 mph, 98 kn)
- Cruise speed: 167 km/h (104 mph, 90 kn) at 90% power
- Range: 667 km (414 mi, 360 nmi)
- Service ceiling: 4,575 m (15,010 ft)
- Rate of climb: 4.07 m/s (801 ft/min)

== Notes ==
=== Bibliography ===
- "About Jabiru". Jabiru. Bundaberg: Jabiru Aircraft. 13 December 2018.
- "Aircraft & Engines Australia". Jabiru. Bundaberg: Jabiru Aircraft. Archived from the original on 8 August 2013.
- "AVTECH PTY. LTD. ACN 010 786 973". ASIC Connect. Melbourne: ASIC.
- Bertrand, Noel; Coulon, Rene. World Directory of Leisure Aviation 2003-04. Lancaster OK: Pagefast.
- Eyre, David C. (8 May 2019). "Avtech Jabiru". Aeropedia.
- "Introducing the Jabiru Family". Jabiru. Bundaberg: Jabiru Aircraft. 27 November 2023.
- "JABIRU AIRCRAFT PTY. LTD. ACN 010 910 077". ASIC Connect. Melbourne: ASIC.
- "The Jabiru SK Quickbuild Kit". Jabiru. Bundaberg: Jabiru Aircraft. Archived from the original on 2 June 2000.
- "The Jabiru SP Quickbuild Kit". Jabiru. Bundaberg: Jabiru Aircraft. Archived from the original on 6 June 2000.
- "The Jabiru SP-T Quickbuild Kit". Jabiru. Bundaberg: Jabiru Aircraft. Archived from the original on 5 June 2000.
- "Jabiru ST". Jabiru. Bundaberg: Jabiru Aircraft. Archived from the original on 10 May 2000.
- "The Jabiru UL Quickbuild Kit". Jabiru. Bundaberg: Jabiru Aircraft. Archived from the original on 20 October 2000.
- Jackson, Paul, ed. (1995). Jane's All the World's Aircraft 1995-96 (86th ed.). Coulsdon, Surrey, United Kingdom: Jane's Information Group.
- Taylor, Michael J. H. (1993). Jane's Encyclopedia of Aviation. London: Studio Editions.
