= Champion J-1 Jupiter =

Jupiter J-1

General information
- Type: Homebuilt aircraft
- National origin: United States of America
- Designer: Kenneth R. Champion

History
- First flight: 1959

The Jupiter J-1 is a single-seat, low wing, homebuilt aircraft with fiberglass covered wood airframe construction.

== Design and development ==
The J-1 Jupiter was an all original design in 1959 using wooden construction methods based on the Pietenpol Air Camper and new applications of fiberglass layups.

The J-1 is a low wing aircraft with conventional landing gear and a large bubble canopy. The wings are configured without dihedral. The fuselage uses a wooden geodesic airframe construction with steel secondary wing spars. The wing panels are covered with single seamless flat fiberglass panels that are bonded to the wooden wing ribs and spars. The leading edge is formed with fiberglass layered up in place. The same process is used on the elevators.

== Operational history ==
The J-1 Jupiter won the Outstanding Design award at the Experimental Aircraft Association airshow in 1959.

== Variants ==
Jupiter K-2
A two-seat development of the J-1, powered by a 125hp Lycoming O-290-G.

== Specifications (Jupiter J-1) ==
Data from Sport Aviation

General characteristics

- Crew: 1
- Length: 17 ft 4 in (5.28 m)
- Wingspan: 21 ft (6.4 m)
- Wing area: 88 sq ft (8.2 m^{2})
- Airfoil: NACA 4412
- Empty weight: 627 lb (284 kg)
- Gross weight: 910 lb (413 kg)
- Fuel capacity: 16 U.S. gallons (61 L; 13 imp gal)
- Powerplant: 1 × Continental A65
- Propellers: 2-bladed MacCauley 65-60

Performance

- Cruise speed: 96 kn (110 mph, 180 km/h)
- Stall speed: 48 kn (55 mph, 89 km/h)
- Rate of climb: 400 ft/min (2.0 m/s)
