= Kieger AK3 =

AK3

General information
- Type: Light aircraft
- National origin: France
- Manufacturer: Junkers Profly France
- Designer: André Kieger
- Number built: 2 by end 2007

History
- First flight: c.2006

The Kieger AK3 is conventionally laid out single engine, tractor configuration, low wing two seat light aircraft built in France from 2006. At least two have flown.

== Design and development ==
The AK3 is the third two-seat, single engine, low wing design from André Kieger. It is produced by Junkers Profly France and is alternatively known as the Junkers Profly Junka UL. The wing has a single spar with a plywood leading edge and a false spar for the mounting of ailerons and flaps. Production aircraft have small winglets. Each wing is fixed to the fuselage with a pair of sailplane style pins for rapid demounting. The fuselage is built around four longerons, giving it a square lower section; the upper fuselage is rounded and merges into the line of the large perspex canopy over the side-by-side seating. The tailplane is mounted on top of the fuselage and the fin is swept; both are plywood structures. There are horn balances on elevators and rudder.

The AK3 is powered by a 58.8 kW (78.9 hp) Rotax 912 UL four cylinder horizontally opposed engine, housed in the nose under a carbon fibre cowling and driving a three blade propeller. It has a tricycle undercarriage, with glass/carcon fibre laminate cantilever spring main legs mounted onto the fuselage and a trailing link nose wheel on a forward angled cantilever leg. The mainwheels have hydraulic brakes and all wheels are faired.

== Operational history ==
The AK3 had its first public showing at the Blois RSA meeting in August 2006. By then it had flown for more than 10 hours. At that time production by Junkers Profly was planned at three a month; one at least had been built by the end of 2007 but current rates are unclear.

The aircraft is marketed as the Junkers Profly France Junka UL.

== Specifications ==
Data from Jane's All the World's Aircraft 2011–12

General characteristics

- Capacity: 2
- Length: 6.26 m (20 ft 6 in)
- Wingspan: 8.20 m (26 ft 11 in)
- Wing area: 10.74 m^{2} (115.6 sq ft)
- Empty weight: 266 kg (586 lb)
- Max takeoff weight: 472.5 kg (1,042 lb)
- Fuel capacity: 60 L (15.9 US gal, 13.2 Imp gal) standard in fuselage, 57 L (18.5 US gal, 15.4 Imp gal) including optional wing tanks
- Powerplant: 1 × Rotax 912 UL flat four, 58.8 kW (78.9 hp)
- Propellers: 3-bladed Duc Swirl

Performance

- Maximum speed: 230 km/h (140 mph, 120 kn)
- Cruise speed: 200 km/h (120 mph, 110 kn)
- Stall speed: 63 km/h (39 mph, 34 kn) flaps down
- Never exceed speed: 250 km/h (160 mph, 130 kn)
