= Johns Multiplane =

Multiplane
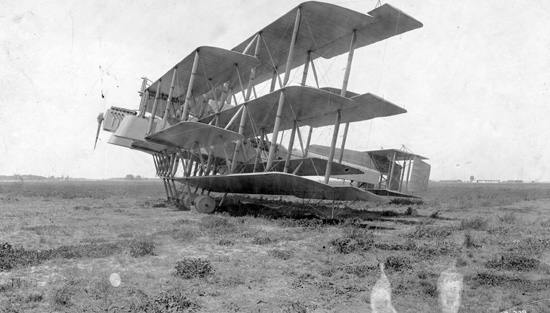
- Johns Multiplane ready for testing circa 1919

General information
- Type: Experimental aircraft
- Manufacturer: American Multiplane Co.
- Designer: Herbert Johns
- Status: Scrapped
- Number built: 1

History
- First flight: 1919

The Johns Multiplane was a very large unsuccessful experimental aircraft having seven wings and six ailerons, powered by three Liberty L-12 V-12 aircraft engines. The machine had the appearance of a biplane spliced onto the front of a triplane with two wings added at the rear. The center fuselage housed the cockpit and one engine in tractor configuration. Both side booms ended with wing-mounted engines in pusher configuration. The aileron control force was found to be extremely high.

== Design and development ==
Designed by Herbert Johns of the American Multiplane Company in Bath, New York, Patent # 1,365,995 Flying Machine was granted to Charles A. Herrmann, also of the American Multiplane Company on Oct. 3, 1916.

== Operational history ==
The massive septi-wing made a series of short hops during testing, but was eventually scrapped in 1920 due to its inability to maintain controlled flight.

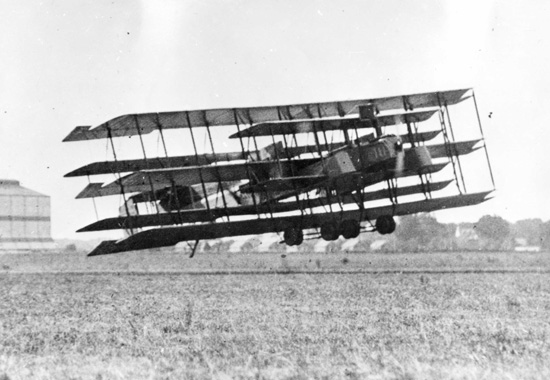
Johns Multiplane

== Specifications ==
General characteristics

- Crew: three
- Length: 55 ft 9 in (17 m)
- Wingspan: 106 ft 4 in (32.4 m)
- Powerplant: 3 × Liberty L-12 water-cooled 45° V-12 piston engine, 400 hp (300 kW) each
