= Jean-Montet Quasar 200 =

French aerobatic competition aircraft

Quasar 200

General information
- Type: Aerobatic competition aircraft
- National origin: France
- Designer: Jean Montet
- Number built: 1

History
- First flight: 10 September 1981

The Jean-Montet Quasar 200 was a single-seat aerobatic competition aircraft designed and amateur-built in France in the early 1980s. Only one was completed; it won one aerobatic competition and was destroyed less than three years later.

== Design and development ==
The Quasar was designed and built by Jean, Pierre and Phillipe Montet. It was one of many designs developed from the available plans of the successful Stephens Akro aerobatic competitor of 1967. They were both mid-wing monoplanes with angular flying surfaces, including cantilever wings and wire-braced tailplanes, and with fixed, cantilever tail wheel undercarriages. With a greater wingspan and a more powerful Lycoming flat-four engine, the 149 kW (200 hp) IO-360-A the Quasar was heavier than the Akro A.

The Quasar first flew on 10 September 1981. On 19 September 1982, Pierre Montet flew the Quasar to win the Marcel Doret Cup for aerobatics at Moulins. It was destroyed on 1 April 1985, at its home airfield in Étampes.

== Specifications ==
Data from Gaillard (1991), p.193

General characteristics

- Crew: one
- Length: 6.0 m (19 ft 8 in)
- Wingspan: 8.20 m (26 ft 11 in)
- Height: 2.10 m (6 ft 11 in)
- Wing area: 12.2 m^{2} (131 sq ft)
- Empty weight: 480 kg (1,058 lb)
- Gross weight: 840 kg (1,852 lb)
- Powerplant: 1 × Lycoming O-360-A air-cooled flat four, 150 kW (200 hp)
- Propellers: 2-bladed
