= Jeof srl =

Italian aircraft manufacturer

- Company type: Privately held company
- Industry: Aerospace
- Fate: Out of business
- Headquarters: Candiana, Italy
- Products: Kit aircraft

Jeof srl was an Italian aircraft manufacturer based in Candiana. The company specialized in the design and manufacture of ultralight aircraft in the form of kits for amateur construction for the European Fédération Aéronautique Internationale microlight category.

The company was a Società a responsabilità limitata (English: limited liability company).

The company developed the Jeof Candiana as a testbed for the Sax 86 engine, which is a derivative of the Fiat Fire four-cylinder four-stroke automotive powerplant. At least ten Candianas were built. The company also produced the Jeof Jeofox.

== Aircraft ==
Summary of aircraft built by Jeof
Model name	First flight	Number built	Type
Jeof Candiana	1990s	at least ten	Two seat light kit aircraft
Jeof Jeofox			light kit aircraft
