= Junkers CL.I =

Ground-attack aircraft by Junkers

J 8, J 10 (CL.I), and J 11 (CLS.I)
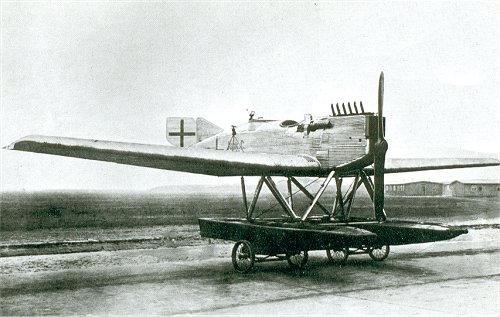
- Junkers J 11 (CLS.I)

General information
- Type: Ground-attack aircraft
- National origin: Germany
- Manufacturer: Junkers
- Primary user: Luftstreitkräfte
- Number built: 51

History
- First flight: 10 December 1917

The Junkers CL.I was a ground-attack aircraft developed in Germany during World War I. Its construction was undertaken by Junkers under the designation J 8 as proof of Hugo Junkers' belief in the monoplane, after his firm had been required by the Idflieg to submit a biplane (the J 4) as its entry in a competition to select a ground-attack aircraft.

== Design and development ==
The J 8 design took the J 7 fighter as its starting point, but had a longer fuselage to accommodate a tail gunner, and larger wings. The prototype flew in late 1917 and was followed over the next few months by three more development aircraft. The Idflieg was sufficiently impressed to want to order the type, but had misgivings about Junkers' ability to manufacture the aircraft in quantity and considered asking Linke-Hoffmann to produce the type under licence. Finally, however, Junkers was allowed to undertake the manufacture as part of a joint venture with Fokker, producing a slightly modified version of the J 8 design as the J 10.

Like the other Junkers designs of the period, the aircraft featured a metal framework that was skinned with corrugated duralumin sheets. 47 examples were delivered before the Armistice, including three built as floatplanes under the designation CLS.I (factory designation J 11). After the war, one or two CL.Is were converted for commercial service by enclosing the rear cockpit under a canopy.

== Operators ==
Germany

- Luftstreitkrafte
- Kaiserliche Marine

Latvia

- Latvian Air Force - Postwar.

== Specifications (CL.I) ==
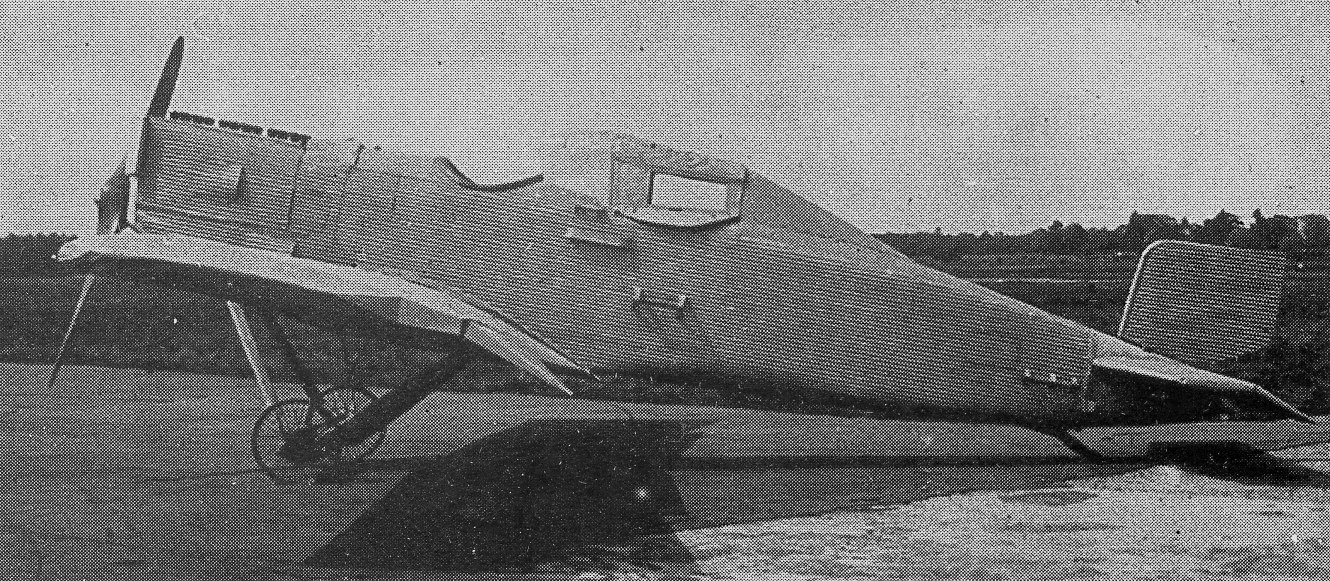
A passenger-carrying J.10

Data from German Aircraft of the First World War

General characteristics

- Crew: Two, pilot and gunner
- Length: 7.90 m (25 ft 11 in)
- Wingspan: 12.04 m (39 ft 6 in)
- Height: 2.65 m (8 ft 8.25 in)
- Wing area: 23.4 m^{2} (253 sq ft)
- Empty weight: 710 kg (1,562 lb)
- Gross weight: 1,050 kg (2,310 lb)
- Powerplant: 1 × Mercedes D.IIIa , 134 kW (180 hp)

Performance

- Maximum speed: 161 km/h (100 mph, 87 kn)
- Endurance: 2 hours
- Service ceiling: 6,000 m (19,700 ft)

Armament

- 2 × fixed, forward-firing machine guns
- 1 × trainable, rearward-firing machine gun
