= Jamieson J =

Model J

General information
- Type: Utility aircraft
- National origin: United States
- Manufacturer: Jamieson
- Number built: 3

History
- First flight: 13 December 1962

The Jamieson J (also known as the Take 1) was a four-seat utility aircraft built in the United States in the early 1960s. It was designed and constructed by Jamieson Corp, which had been purchasing military surplus Culver Cadets and remanufacturing them for the civil market. Jamieson's first aircraft was the J-1 Jupiter built in 1949 which had a V-tail replacing the standard type tail of the Cadet. What made the Jupiter attractive to the private plane market was its price of $2500. Four Jupiters were produced. The 1960s Model J was patterned closely on the Cadet as the earlier J-1 Jupiter was, but was a larger, new-built aircraft. Like its forerunner it was a conventional, low-wing cantilever monoplane, but featured retractable tricycle undercarriage.

Certification was achieved in July 1963, after which only another two examples were built before development was abandoned.

== Specifications ==
Data from Jane's All the World's Aircraft 1965–66

General characteristics

- Crew: 1
- Capacity: 3 passengers
- Length: 21 ft 6 1/2 in (6.566 m)
- Wingspan: 29 ft 0 in (8.84 m)
- Height: 7 ft 2 3/4 in (2.203 m)
- Wing area: 123.22 sq ft (11.448 m^{2})
- Aspect ratio: 6.83:1
- Airfoil: NACA 4415 at route, NACA 4412 at tip
- Empty weight: 885 lb (401 kg)
- Max takeoff weight: 1,880 lb (853 kg)
- Fuel capacity: 38 US gal (32 imp gal; 140 L) normal, 60 US gal (50 imp gal; 230 L) extra tanks
- Powerplant: 1 × Lycoming O-320-A3C air-cooled flat-four engine, 150 hp (110 kW)

Performance

- Cruise speed: 158 mph (254 km/h, 137 kn) (max cruise)
- Stall speed: 51 mph (82 km/h, 44 kn) (flaps down)
- Never exceed speed: 187 mph (301 km/h, 162 kn)
- Range: 1,000 mi (1,600 km, 870 nmi) (with auxiliary fuel)
- Service ceiling: 17,000 ft (5,200 m)
- Rate of climb: 1,000 ft/min (5.1 m/s)
