= MSrE M-24 =

M-24
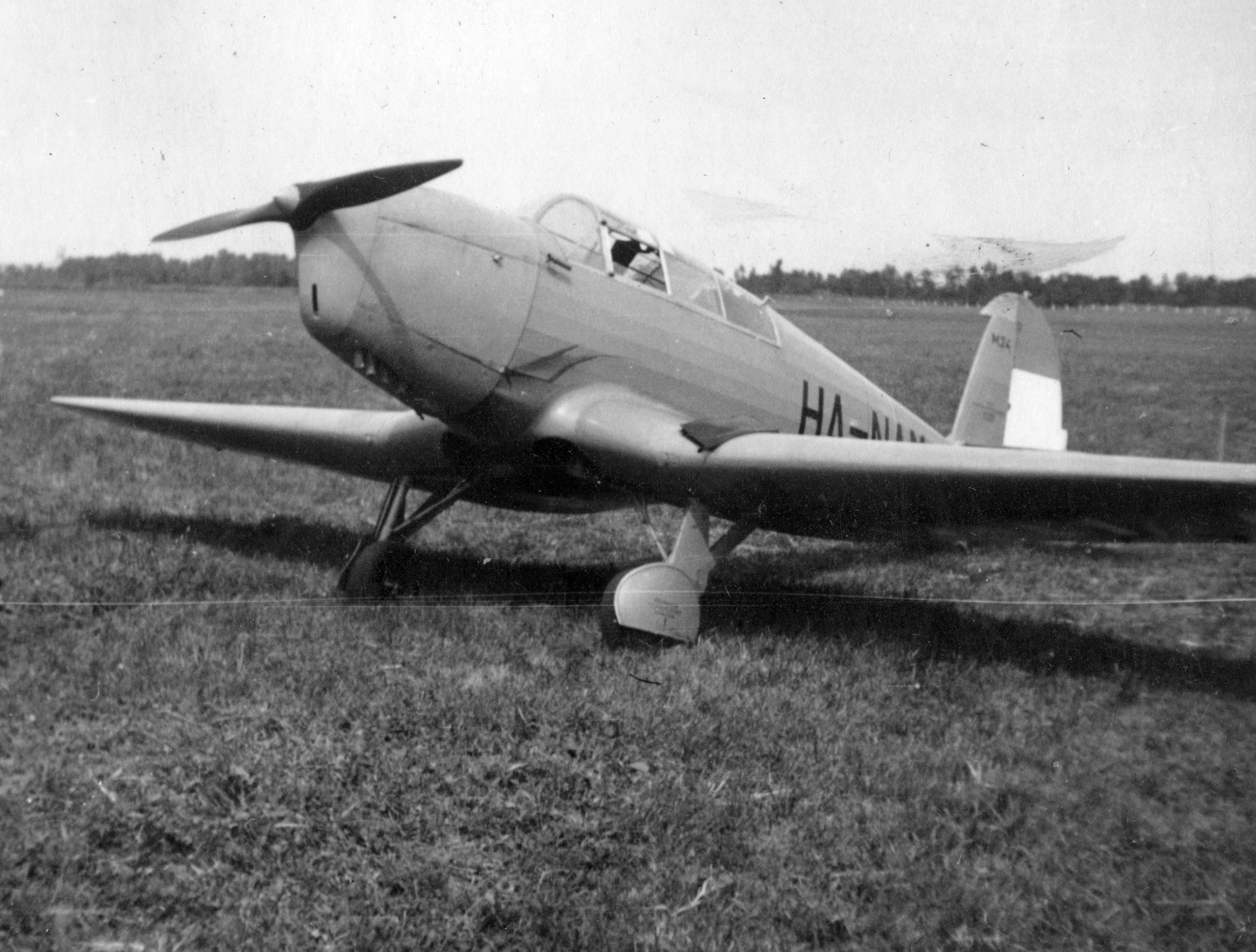

General information
- Type: Sport aircraft
- National origin: Hungary
- Manufacturer: Műegyetemi Sportrepülő Egyesület
- Designer: József Szegedy and Endre Jancsó
- Number built: 5

History
- First flight: 1938

The MSrE M-24 was a sport aircraft built in Hungary in the late 1930s. It was a low-wing cantilever monoplane of conventional design with a wing of elliptical planform. The pilot and single passenger sat in tandem under a canopy that fully enclosed the cockpit, and the main wheels of the tailwheel undercarriage were retractable. A small series of five aircraft was produced, with the first two supplied to Egypt.

== Operators ==
Egypt

- Royal Egyptian Air Force

== Specifications ==
General characteristics

- Crew: one pilot
- Capacity: one passenger
- Powerplant: 1 × Hirth HM 504 , 75 kW (100 hp)
