= Jojo Wings =

Czech aircraft manufacturer

- Company type: Privately held company
- Industry: Aerospace
- Founded: 1992
- Headquarters: Roudnice nad Labem, Czech Republic
- Products: Paragliders, parachutes, parafoil kites
- Website: www.jojowing.com

Jojo Wings (also styled as JOJOWINGS and Jojo Wing) is a Czech aircraft manufacturer based in Roudnice nad Labem. The company specializes in the design and manufacture of paragliders and parachutes in the form of ready-to-fly aircraft. The company also makes parafoil kites.

== History ==
Founded in 1992, the company first sent competitors to the World Paragliding Championships in 1993. The company quickly expanded into canopies for powered paragliding and a number of National and European Champions flew to success on their wings. By 1994 they were building kite wings for snow and land use, with two snow board World Champions using Jojo kites.

In 1994 the company also expanded into constructing parachutes for civil and later military use.

By the mid-2000s the company had a range of paragliders that included the performance Addiction, the intermediate Yoki and the two-place Quest Bi for flight training.

Reviewer Noel Bertrand noted the very low prices of the company's paragliders in a 2003 review, saying "The prices are very interesting".

By 2016 the company was only building one paraglider, the Speedy and five models of parachute, the HOP 330, Sonic, Raptor, XF15 and Base.

== Aircraft ==
Summary of aircraft built by Jojo Wings:

- Jojo Addiction
- Jojo Instinct
- Jojo Quest Bi
- Jojo Speedy
- Jojo Yoki
