= Jero Nᵒ 9 Antwerpen (1911) =

N° 9 Antwerpen
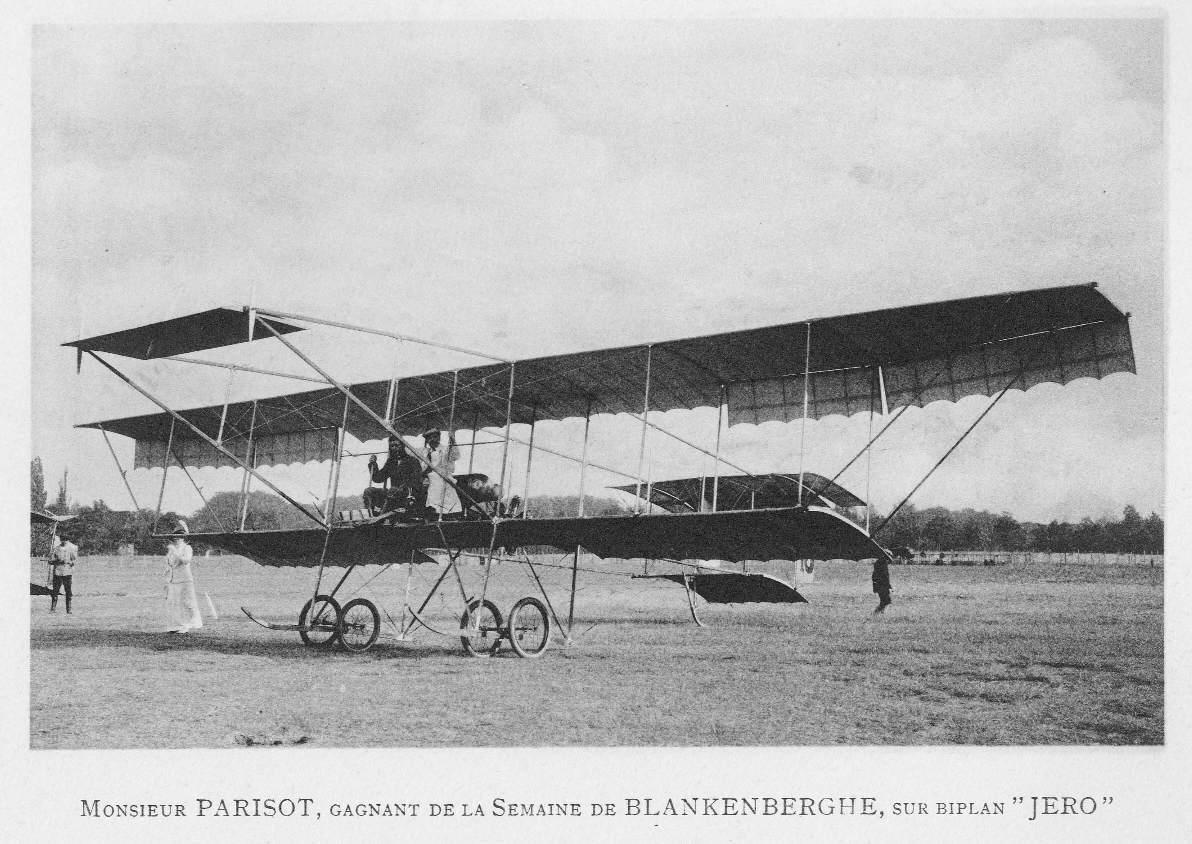

General information
- Type: Experimental biplane
- National origin: Belgium
- Manufacturer: Jero
- Number built: One

History
- First flight: 1911

The Jéro N° 9 Antwerpen 1911 aeroplane was born from the close cooperation between Belgian adventurer Pierre de Caters and the Bollekens Brothers. It was intended to appear at the Aviator stand at the Motor Show of 1910-1911, and especially to take part in the Circuit of Belgium in 1911.

Construction began at the time of Baron de Caters' trip to India. The Bollekens Brothers, advised by the count d' Hespel and Lieutenant Sarteel, succeeded in presenting the aircraft at the Motor Show, where it was noticed by experts.

In spring of 1911 the aeroplane again became the property of the Bollekens brothers. The Bollekens brothers painted the text 'Jéro-Anvers' on all the rudders at this time. The Jéro N° 9 was equipped with a cockpit protected by a hood which carried the armorial of the town of Antwerp.

The pilot Parisot, flying the Jéro N°9 (with fuselage but with no hooding), finished in second place at the Circuit of Belgium, and won several awards.

Back to Sint-Job-in't-Goor, the Jéro N° 9 was the preferred aircraft of student pilots, with Henri Molla as instructor. Modified with a triangular tail in 1913 and equipped with a Gnôme 80 CV engine, the Jero N°9 was used for training at Saint-Job and Kiewit.

With the declaration of World War I in 1914, all Bollekens Brothers aircraft, including the Jero No.9, were placed at the disposal of the military.

M. Huybrechts also built a scale model of this aircraft which was stored for many years, but has been on display since January 2006.
