= Johnson Twin-60 =

Twin-60
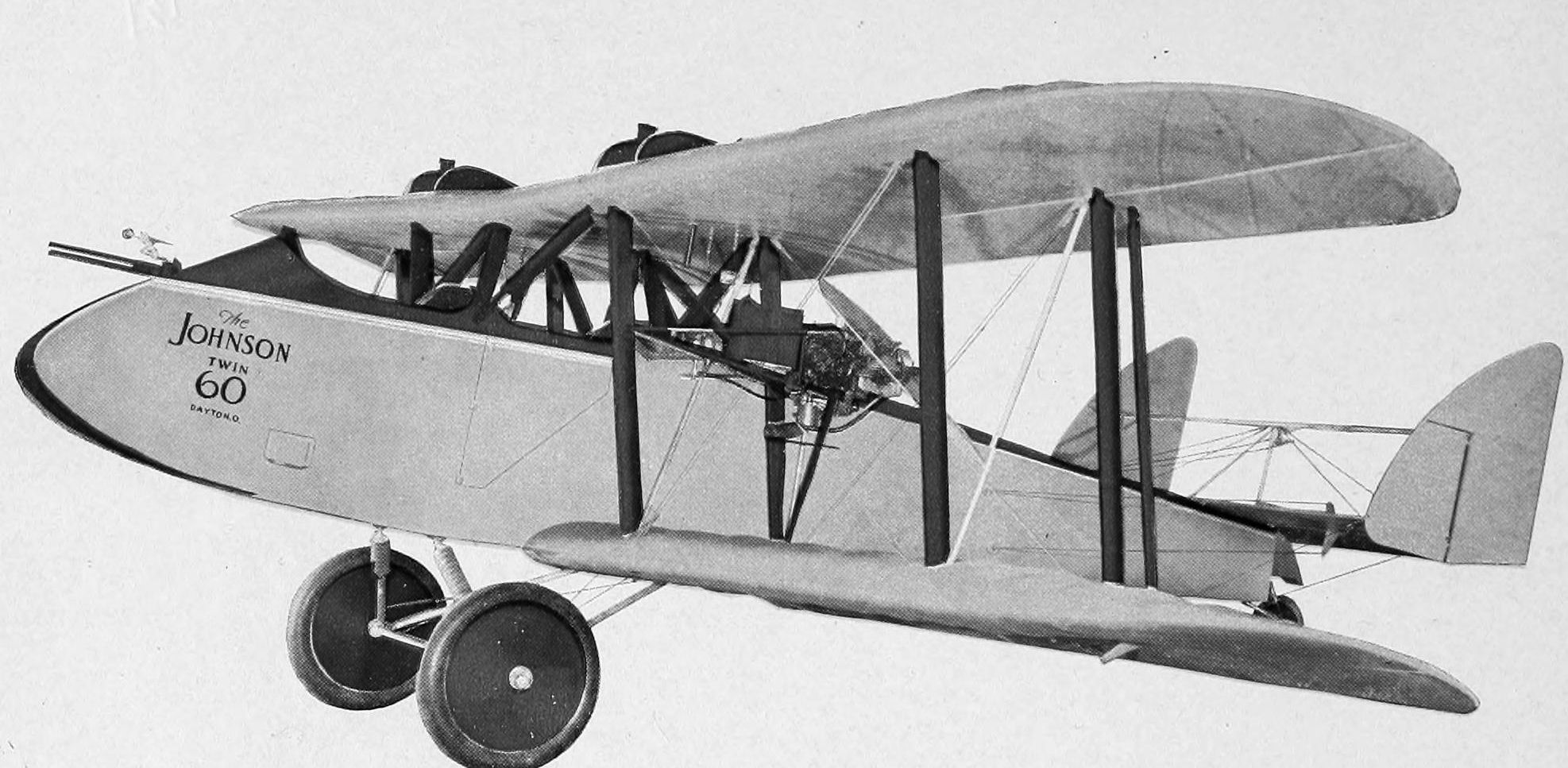

General information
- National origin: U.S.
- Manufacturer: Johnson Airplane & Supply Co, Dayton, Ohio, U.S
- Number built: 1

History
- First flight: 18 December 1926

The Johnson Twin-60 was a small, two seat biplane intended for private owners. It had twin engines for safety and the performance and undercarriage designed for short and rough field use. Despite its refinements only one was definitely built

== Design and development ==
Though the Twin-60 was one of many 1920s two-seaters, its design was far from typical, with novel features driven by the aims of low running costs, easy maintenance, safety and the ability to use very basic landing grounds. The latter required short take-off distances, high climb rates, low landing speeds under good control and wheel brakes. The -60 in the name referred to the approximate total horse power from its twin pusher engines. Twin engines provided security in case of engine failure, so long as controllability remained. They also improved the forward view and kept the occupants out of the engine exhaust and oil emissions; as pushers they were over the rear of the wing and closer to the aircraft's centre of gravity.

The Twin-60, a two-bay, equal span biplane, was of mixed construction. Its wings were largely wooden, with single spruce spars and plywood ribs, fabric-covering and rectangular, rounded tip plans. They were mounted with 2° of dihedral and 12 in (305 mm) of stagger. It had externally connected, long span, broad chord ailerons on upper and lower wings to ensure good control at low landing speeds. The ailerons were cambered to obviate the need for differential deflections.

The two uncowled, air cooled, 32 hp (24 kW), horizontally opposed twin cylinder Bristol Cherub III engines were mounted in frames onto the inner interplane struts. Because of the stagger their propellers were behind the trailing edges of the upper wing but just above the lower one. Each frame was attached at only three points. making engine changes rapid. Engine related instruments were placed under each engine, easily visible from either cockpit. There were no fuel pumps as each engine was gravity fed from its own upper wing tank, each holding enough fuel for eight hours of flight.

The fuselage had a welded steel tube structure of rectangular section, though with raised upper decking. There were two open cockpits in tandem with a port side, lockable door for access to the rear seat under the upper wing. The aircraft could be flown from either seat as dual, demountable controls were fitted. The upper wing was attached centrally to the fuselage by multiple cabane struts. Behind the wing the fuselage tapered to the tail, also of welded steel construction. Its rectangular plan tailplane was mounted on top of the fuselage and carried a narrow chord elevator. The tailplane also carried small endplate fins with much larger, curved, balanced rudders, placed directly in the slipstream of the engines to enhance low speed rudder authority.

The Twin-60 had a conventional, fixed undercarriage with the mainwheels on a single axle mounted on short, shock-absorbing legs from the lower fuselage longerons ahead of the wings and with trailing drag struts. The wheels were large, better on rough surfaces and were, unusually, rubber-shod cast duralumin discs. They were equipped with independent, pedal operated disc brakes to limit landing roll. Since the Twin 60 did not need the drag of a tailskid to slow it down on landing, the skid was replaced by a large, castering tailwheel on a short, rubber disc-damped leg beyond the extreme fuselage, simplifying ground handling.

== Operational history ==
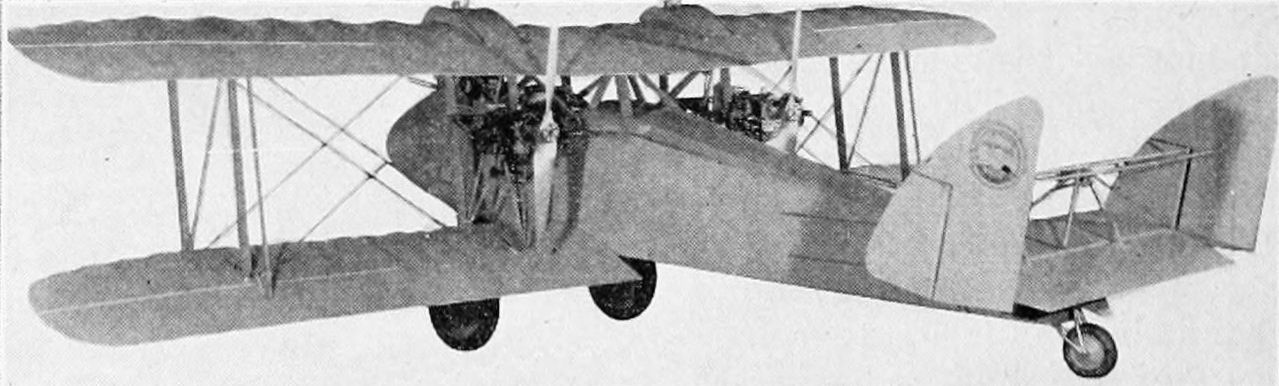

The Twin-60 first flew on 18 December 1926. Without a passenger, it took off on its maiden flight after covering 75 ft (23 m) in three seconds and landed within only twice its length. By the year end it had been flown by several pilots including beginners and its good handling characteristics with twin and single engines running established. Fuel consumption was 24 mpg‑US (10 km/L).

It was only the third aircraft to gain a U.S. Approved Type Certificate (ATC), a qualification introduced in 1927. Only one example is confirmed, as a suggested second airframe may have been only a re-registration of the first. In June 1927 it was lost in a crash at Bettis Field, Pittsburgh, Pennsylvania.

== Specifications ==
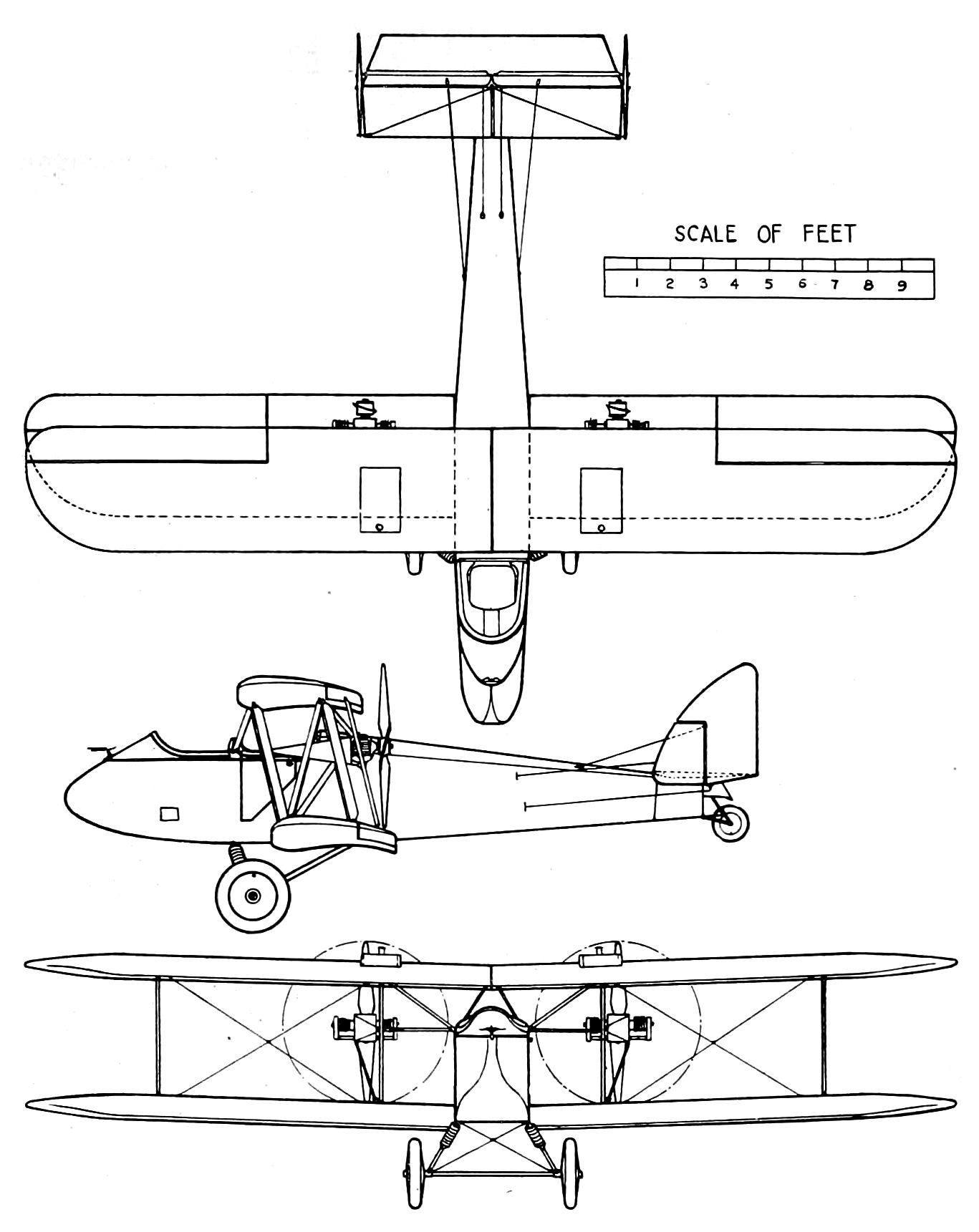

Data from Aero Digest January 1927 except where noted

General characteristics

- Crew: One pilot
- Capacity: One passenger
- Length: 21 ft 0 in (6.40 m)
- Wingspan: 28 ft 0 in (8.53 m)
- Height: 7 ft 10 in (2.39 m)
- Wing area: 194.2 sq ft (18.04 m^{2})
- Empty weight: 800 lb (363 kg)
- Gross weight: 1,320 lb (599 kg)
- Powerplant: 2 × Bristol Cherub III Air cooled, horizontally opposed twin cylinder in pusher configuration, 32 hp (24 kW) each At 2,900 rpm for cruise
- Propellers: 2-bladed Curtiss-Reed, 4 ft 11 in (1.50 m) diameter Duralumin

Performance

- Maximum speed: 85 mph (137 km/h, 74 kn)
- Stall speed: 32 mph (51 km/h, 28 kn)
- Range: 480 mi (770 km, 420 nmi)
- Service ceiling: 1,180 ft (360 m) absolute
- Time to altitude: 10,000 ft (3,000 m) in 41 min
- Take-off distance: with an overload weight of 1,430 lb (650 kg), 150 ft (46 m)
- Landing speed: 25 mph (40 km/h)
