= Junkers D.I =

German monoplane fighter aircraft

J 7 and J 9 (D.I)
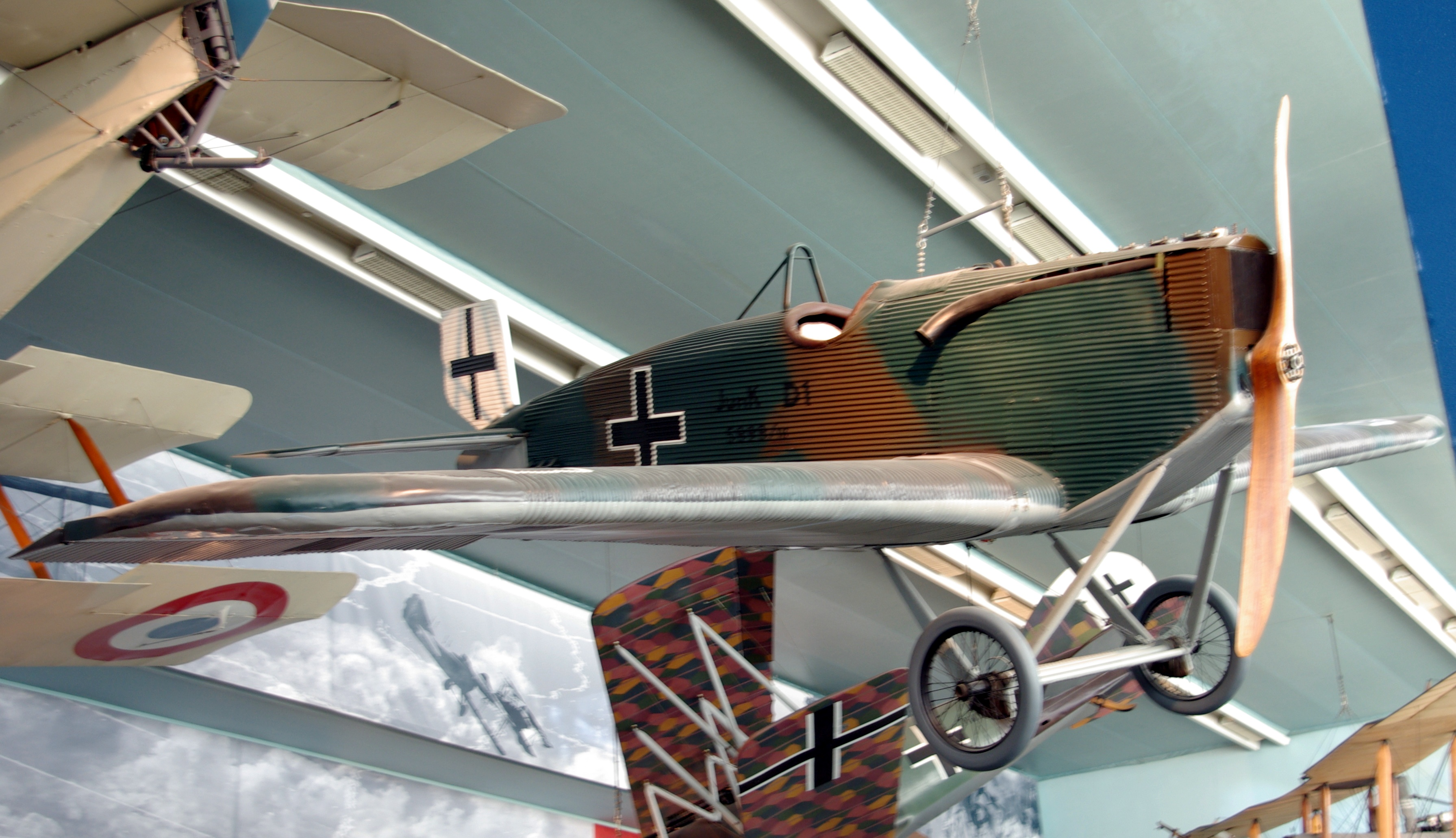
- Junkers D.I survivor at Musée de l'Air et de l'Espace

General information
- Type: Fighter
- National origin: Germany
- Manufacturer: Junkers
- Designer: Hugo Junkers
- Status: retired
- Primary user: Imperial German Navy
- Number built: 41

History
- Manufactured: 1918
- Introduction date: 1918
- First flight: 17 September 1917

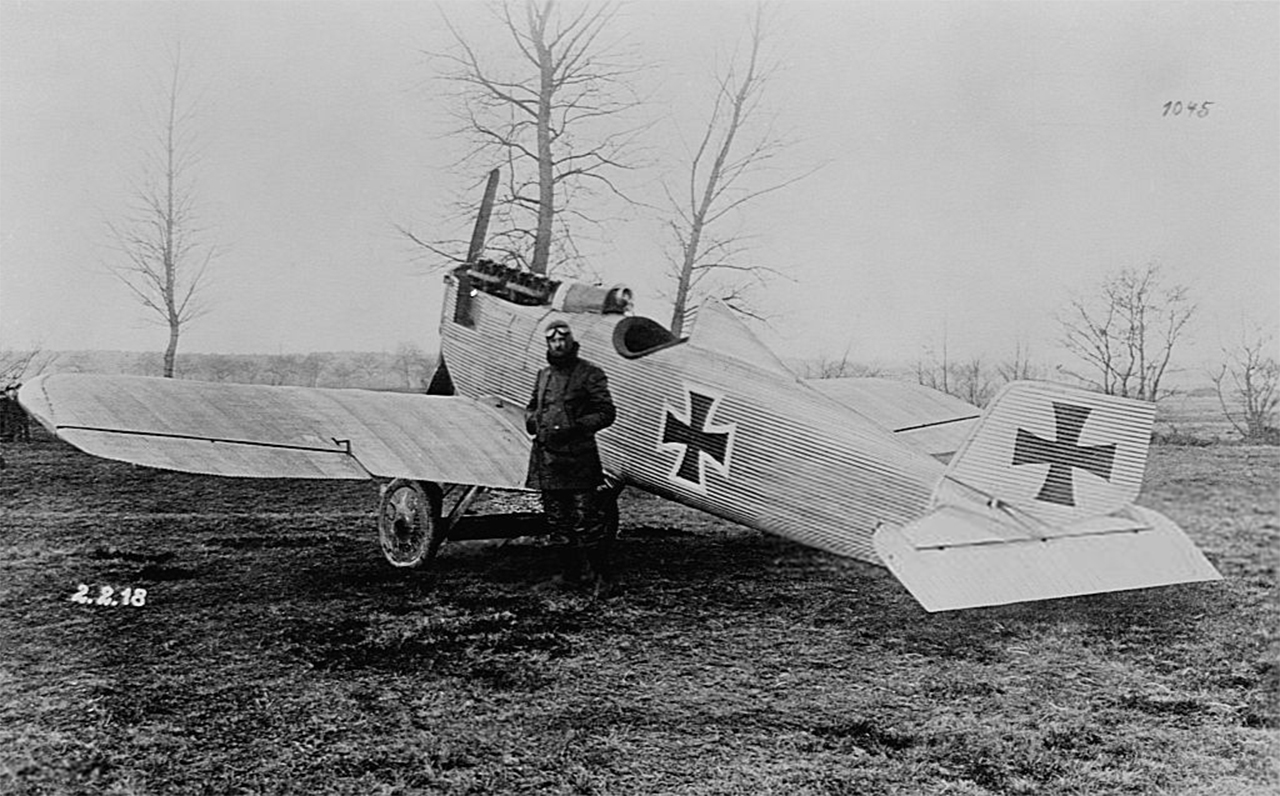
The Junkers J 7, prototype of the J 9 / D.I

The Junkers D.I (factory designation J 9) was a monoplane fighter aircraft produced in Germany late in World War I, significant for becoming the first all-metal fighter to enter service. The prototype, a private venture by Junkers named the J 7, first flew on 17 September 1917, going through nearly a half-dozen detail changes in its design during its tests. When it was demonstrated to the Idflieg early the following year it proved impressive enough to result in an order for three additional aircraft for trials. The changes made by Junkers were significant enough for the firm to rename the next example the J 9, which was supplied to the Idflieg instead of the three J 7s ordered.

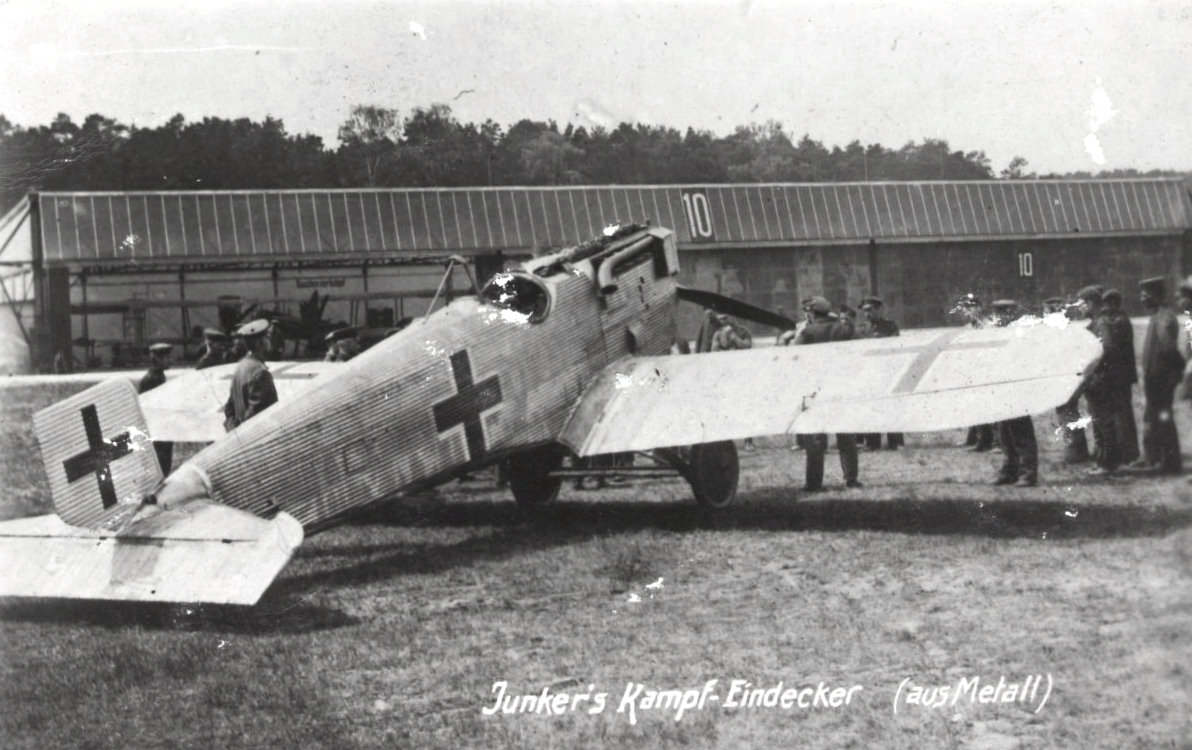
Lengthened-fuselage and extended wingspan Junkers D.I (J.9/II) undergoing evaluation

During tests, the J 9 lacked the manoeuvrability necessary for a front-line fighter but was judged fit for a naval fighter and a batch of 12 was ordered. These were supplied to a naval unit by September 1918, which then moved to the Eastern Front after the Armistice.

== Variants ==
J 7
company designation for early prototype variants, one built (three completed as J 9s).
J 9
company designation for late prototypes and production models
J 9/II
company designation for lengthened fuselage version
D.I
Idflieg designation

== Surviving aircraft ==
One example survives and is on display in the Musée de l'Air et de l'Espace, at the Paris–Le Bourget Airport, 11km north of Paris, France. Several copies have been built, including one on display at the Militärhistorisches Museum Flugplatz Berlin-Gatow.

== Specifications ==
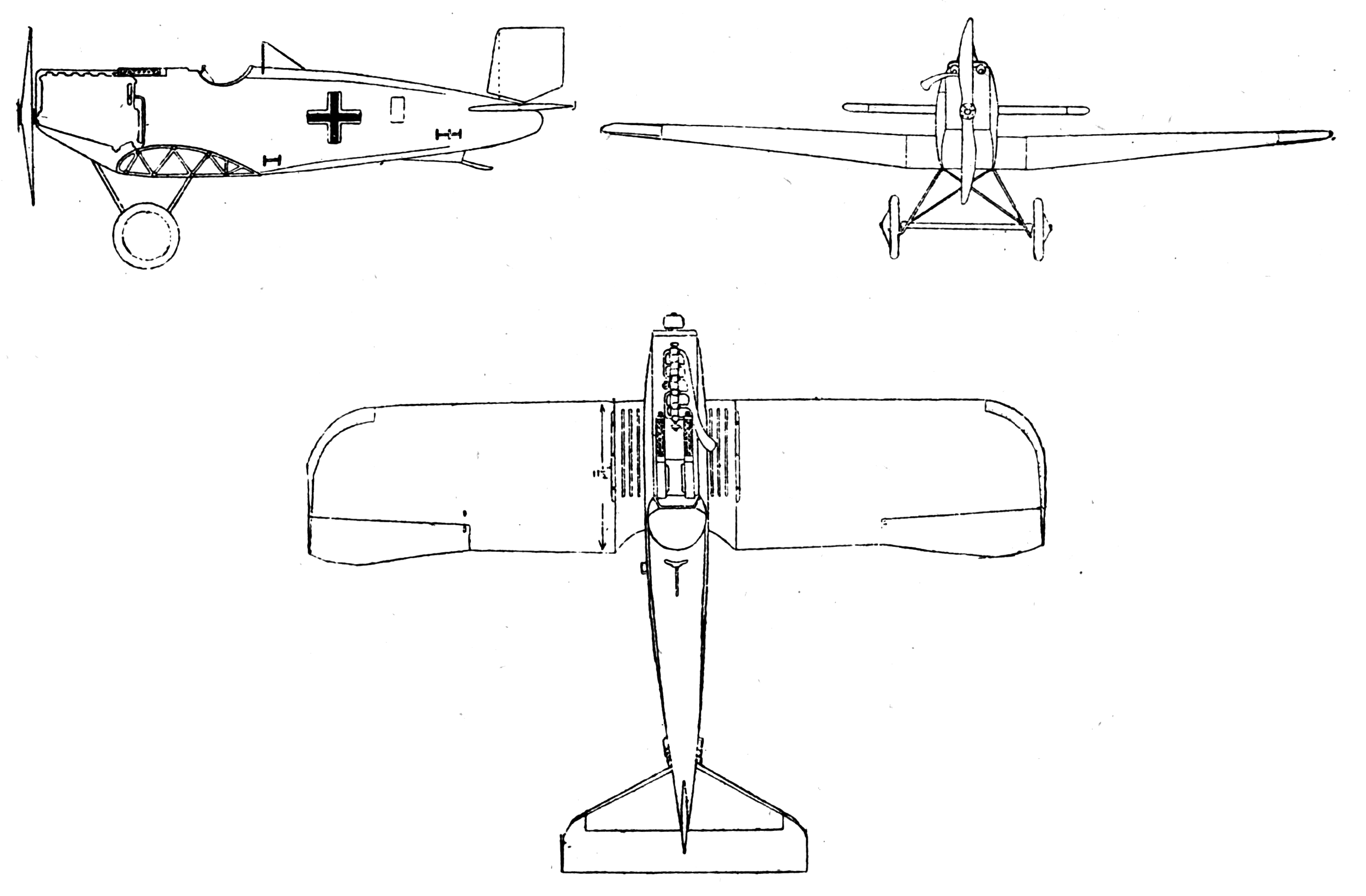
Junkers D.I 3-view drawing from L'Aerophile March,1921

Data from Holmes, 2005. p 32

General characteristics

- Crew: One pilot
- Length: 7.25 m (23 ft 9.4 in)
- Wingspan: 9.00 m (29 ft 6.3 in)
- Height: 2.60 m (8 ft 6 in)
- Empty weight: 654 kg (1,438 lb)
- Gross weight: 834 kg (1,834 lb)
- Powerplant: 1 × BMW IIIa water-cooled 6-cylinder inline , 138 kW (185 hp)

Performance

- Maximum speed: 176 km/h (109 mph, 95 kn)
- Endurance: 1.5 hours
- Service ceiling: 6,000 m (19,700 ft)
- Rate of climb: 3.5 m/s (683 ft/min)

Armament

- 2 × fixed, forward-firing Spandau machine guns

== See also ==
Related development

- Junkers J.I
- Junkers CL.I

Aircraft of comparable role, configuration, and era

- Fokker V.25
- Zeppelin-Lindau D.I
