= Junkers K 16 =

Small German airliner

K 16
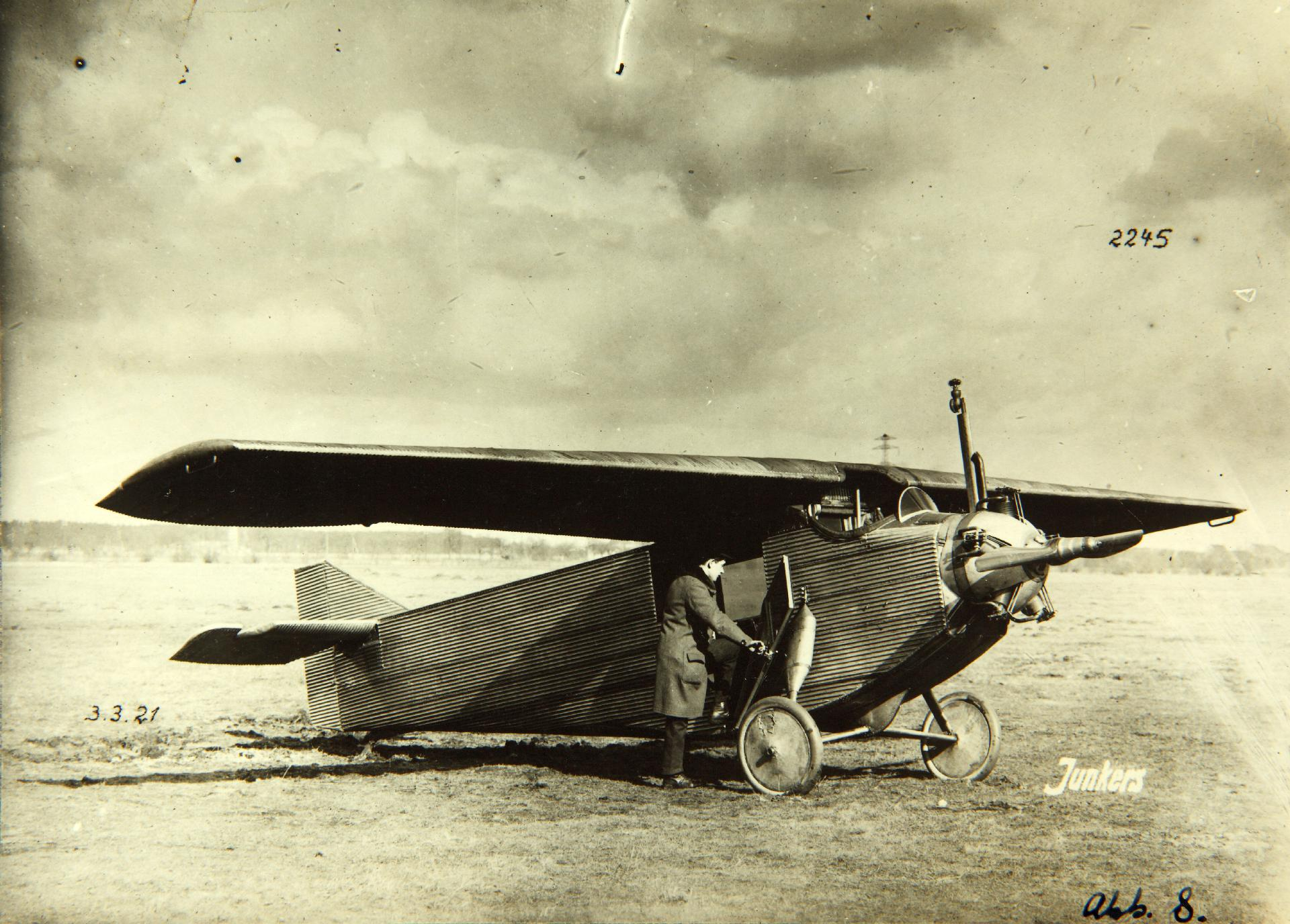

General information
- Type: Airliner
- National origin: Germany
- Manufacturer: Junkers
- Number built: 17

History
- First flight: 3 March 1921

The Junkers K 16 was a small airliner produced in Germany in the early 1920s. It was a conventional, high-wing cantilever monoplane of all-metal construction, equipped with fixed, tailwheel undercarriage. The pilot sat in an open cockpit, while the two passengers were provided with an enclosed cabin within the fuselage. Shortly after the prototype flew, aircraft production in Germany was brought to a complete halt by the Allies, and the K 16 was quickly evacuated to the Netherlands to avoid confiscation. There, it was stored by Fokker until the restrictions were relaxed and work recommenced at Junkers' Dessau factory in 1924. By this time, however, the airline niche that the tiny K 16 had been intended to fill no longer existed, and the small number that were produced were mostly sold to private owners. Junkers entered two K 16s in the 1925 Deutsche Rundflug, with one machine winning second place in the competition.

== Variants ==
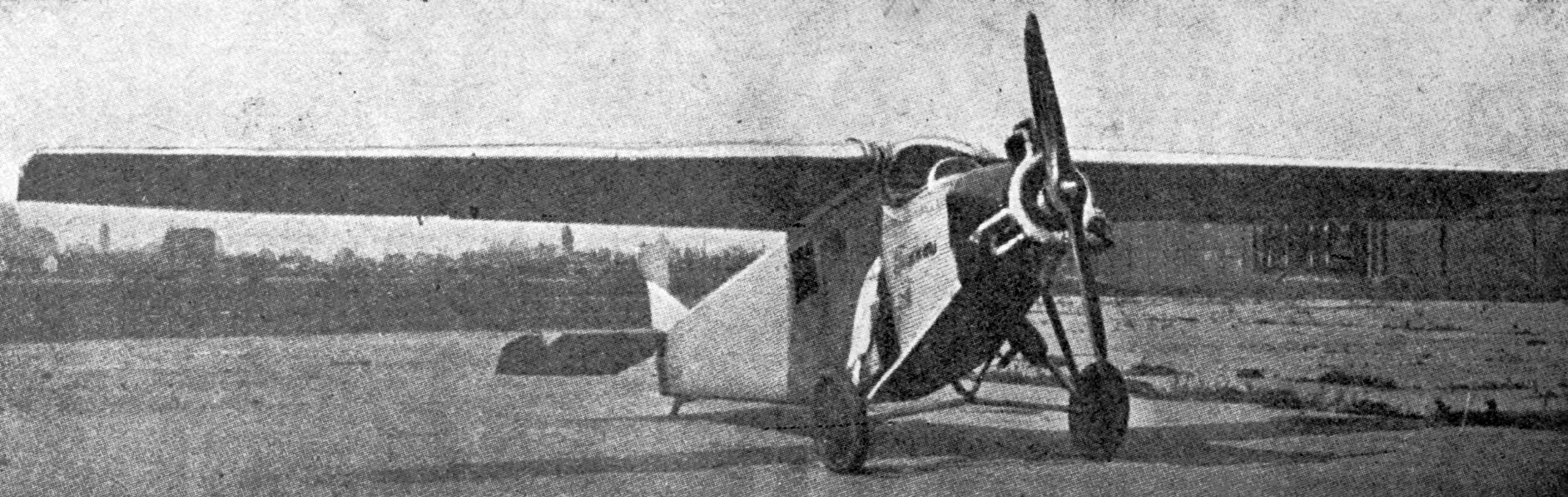
Junkers K.16ce photo from L'Air January 15, 1926

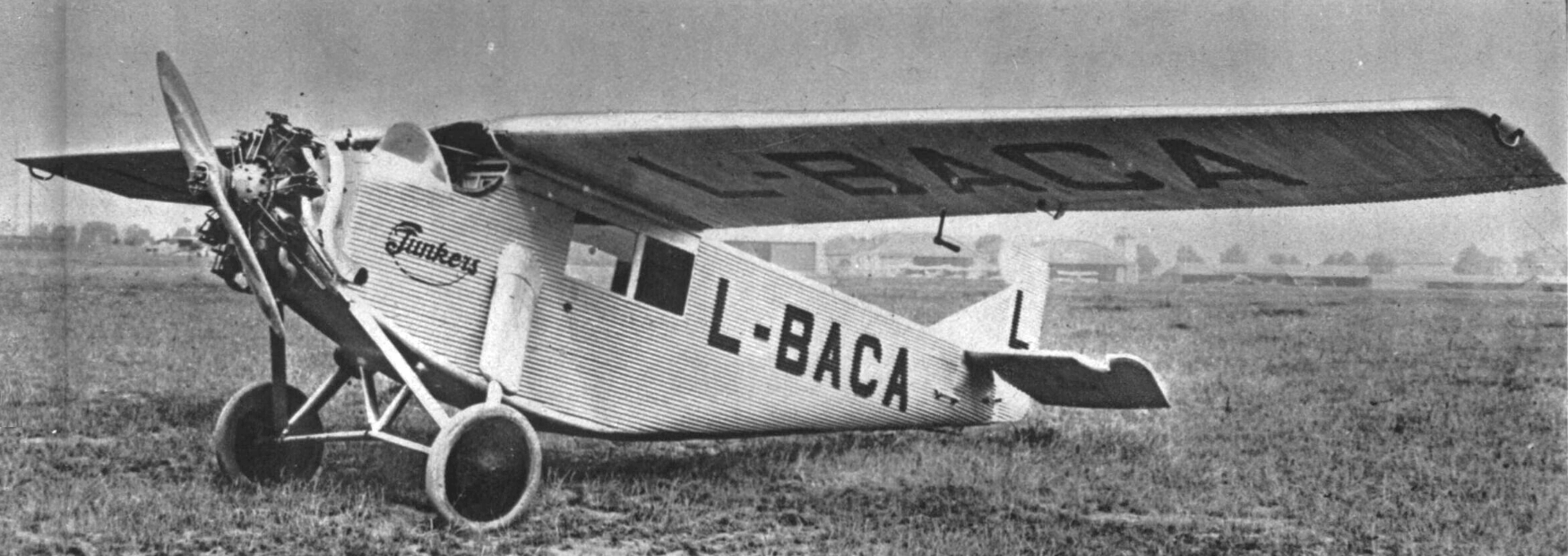
Engine Walter NZ-120 und Junkers K 16bo

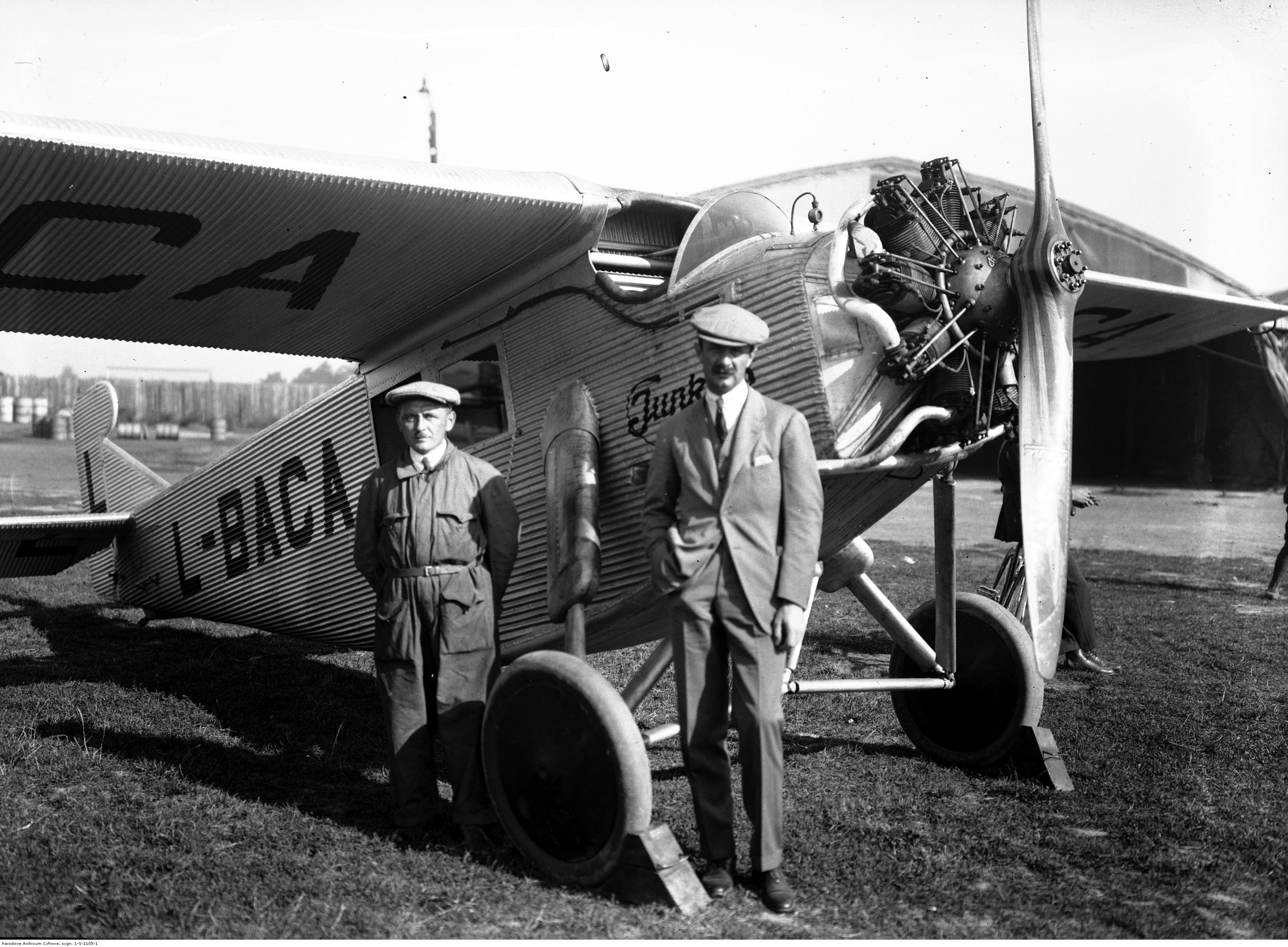
Junkers K16 in Kraków, 1928

- K 16 - initial version with Siemens-Halske Sh 4 engine, later changed to Sh 5
  - K 16a - modified undercarriage and rear fuselage (modified from prototype)
  - K 16b - production versions with new wing and a variety of engine choices:
    - K 16ba - Siemens-Halske Sh 5 engine
    - K 16bi - Siemens-Halske Sh 20 engine
    - K 16bo - Walter NZ 120 engine
  - K 16c - as K 16b but with modified nose section to accommodate engine change
    - K 16ce - Bristol Lucifer engine

== Specifications (K 16 prototype) ==
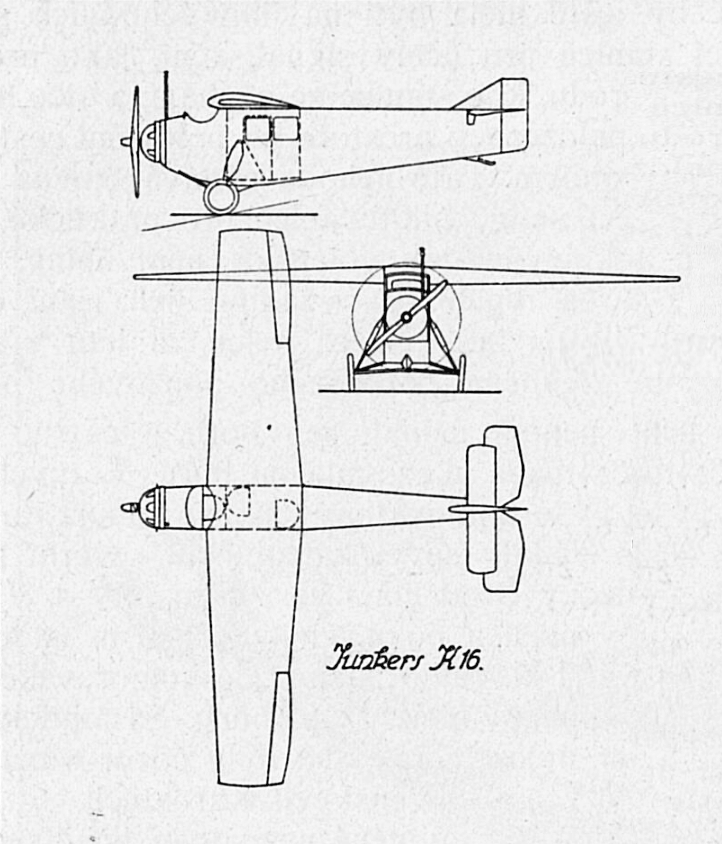
Three-view drawing of K16

General characteristics

- Crew: One pilot
- Capacity: 2 passengers
- Length: 8.00 m (26 ft 3 in)
- Wingspan: 11.00 m (36 ft 1 in)
- Height: 2.75 m (9 ft 0 in)
- Wing area: 16.50 m^{2} (178 sq ft)
- Empty weight: 430 kg (950 lb)
- Gross weight: 850 kg (1,870 lb)
- Powerplant: 1 × Siemens-Halske Sh 4 , 49 kW (65 hp)

Performance

- Maximum speed: 145 km/h (91 mph, 79 kn)
- Range: 600 km (375 mi, 326 nmi)
