= Jingmen A2C Ultra Seaplane =

Chinese three-seat ultralight aircraft

A2C Ultra Seaplane

General information
- Type: Ultralight aircraft
- National origin: China
- Manufacturer: Jingmen Aviation Tech
- Status: In production (2015)
- Number built: ~100 (2016)

History
- Manufactured: 2003-2015
- Introduction date: 2003

The Jingmen A2C Ultra Seaplane is a Chinese three-seat ultralight aircraft that was designed by the China Avionics Research Institute (the 605 Institute) and produced by Jingmen Aviation of Jingmen, introduced in 2003.

== Design and development ==
The A2C was designed to comply with the Civil Aviation Authority of China rules. It was given a Chinese type authority on 18 July 2003 and a production certificate in 2004. It was designed for the agricultural aircraft, aerial photography, search and rescue, communications and sport roles.

The design features a strut-braced high-wing, a three-seat open cockpit with a windshield, fixed tricycle landing gear or floats and a single engine in pusher configuration.

The aircraft is made from bolted-together aluminum tubing, with its flying surfaces covered in Dacron sailcloth. Its 11.28 m (37.0 ft) has an area of 19.79 m^{2} (213.0 sq ft). The standard engine used is the certified 80 hp (60 kW) Rotax 912A2 four-stroke powerplant.

Almost 100 had been delivered by 2016.

== Operational history ==
Reviewer Marino Boric described the design in a 2015 review as having a "big load capacity, economy, safe and reliable".

== Variants ==
A2C
Seaplane model
A2C-L
Landplane model with tricycle landing gear.

== Specifications (A2C) ==
Data from Tacke

General characteristics

- Crew: one
- Capacity: two passengers
- Wingspan: 11.28 m (37 ft 0 in)
- Wing area: 19.28 m^{2} (207.5 sq ft)
- Empty weight: 316 kg (697 lb)
- Gross weight: 520 kg (1,146 lb)
- Fuel capacity: 80 litres (18 imp gal; 21 US gal), or optionally 120 litres (26 imp gal; 32 US gal)
- Powerplant: 1 × Rotax 912A2 four cylinder, liquid and air-cooled, four stroke aircraft engine, 60 kW (80 hp)

Performance

- Maximum speed: 120 km/h (75 mph, 65 kn)
- Cruise speed: 80 km/h (50 mph, 43 kn)
- Stall speed: 62 km/h (39 mph, 33 kn)
- Rate of climb: 1.83 m/s (360 ft/min)
- Wing loading: 26.3 kg/m^{2} (5.4 lb/sq ft)
