= Klaus-Dieter Flick =

German lawyer and broker (born 1937)

Klaus-Dieter Flick (born 1937) is a German lawyer and wealthy former financial broker, known as a convicted Nazi art and military equipment collector from Kitzeberg, a wealthy suburb of Heikendorf on the Kieler Förde (Kiel Fjord). Flick became internationally known in 2015 through the affair surrounding the Wehrmacht tank set up in a hall of honor in his underground Fallout shelter. Newspaper reports about the affair went around the world and were among others published in The New York Times, The Washington Post, Le Monde and The Guardian (London).

== Life ==
=== Search for Nazi art ===
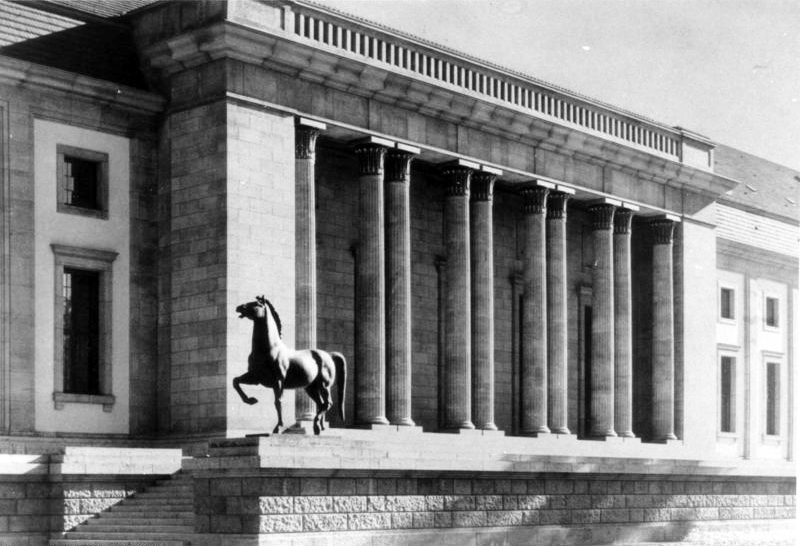
"Striding Horses", New Reich Chancellery (garden front), Berlin, 1939

The 'panzer affair' was sparked by the search for two larger-than-life NS bronze statues, the "Striding Horses", which until 1945 flanked the entrance stairs on the garden front of Adolf Hitler's New Reich Chancellery in Berlin. The horses were created by the National Socialist sculptor Josef Thorak for the New Reich Chancellery in 1939. After the end of the war and the demolition of the Reich Chancellery in 1947–48, the sculptures were stored for decades on the Soviet base in Eberswalde near Berlin. After that they were considered lost. It was not until 2015 that 'Hitler's horses' caught the attention of investigators from the Rhineland-Palatinate State Criminal Police Office (LKA/Landeskriminalamt) because they were apparently offered for sale. According to estimates, they would have brought in up to 8 million euros on the black market, the material value of the bronze horses, which weighed tons, was estimated at a six-figure amount. The LKA, supported by the Dutch art detective Arthur Brand (investigator), soon found what it was looking for. The sculptures were confiscated from an entrepreneur from Bad Dürkheim. Before that, according to statements by Flick, the sculptures spent two years in his garden, where they were also widely visible to the public.

In addition to the horse sculptures and Wehrmacht weapons, the search was apparently also about other Nazi art, e.g. a Nazi statue named Die Wehrmacht by Arno Breker. It originally stood at the central main portal in the courtyard of the Reich Chancellery. Such a statue is still in the garden of the Flick Villa today. According to Flick's lawyer Peter Gramsch, however, this is a copy.

=== The Panzer Affair ===
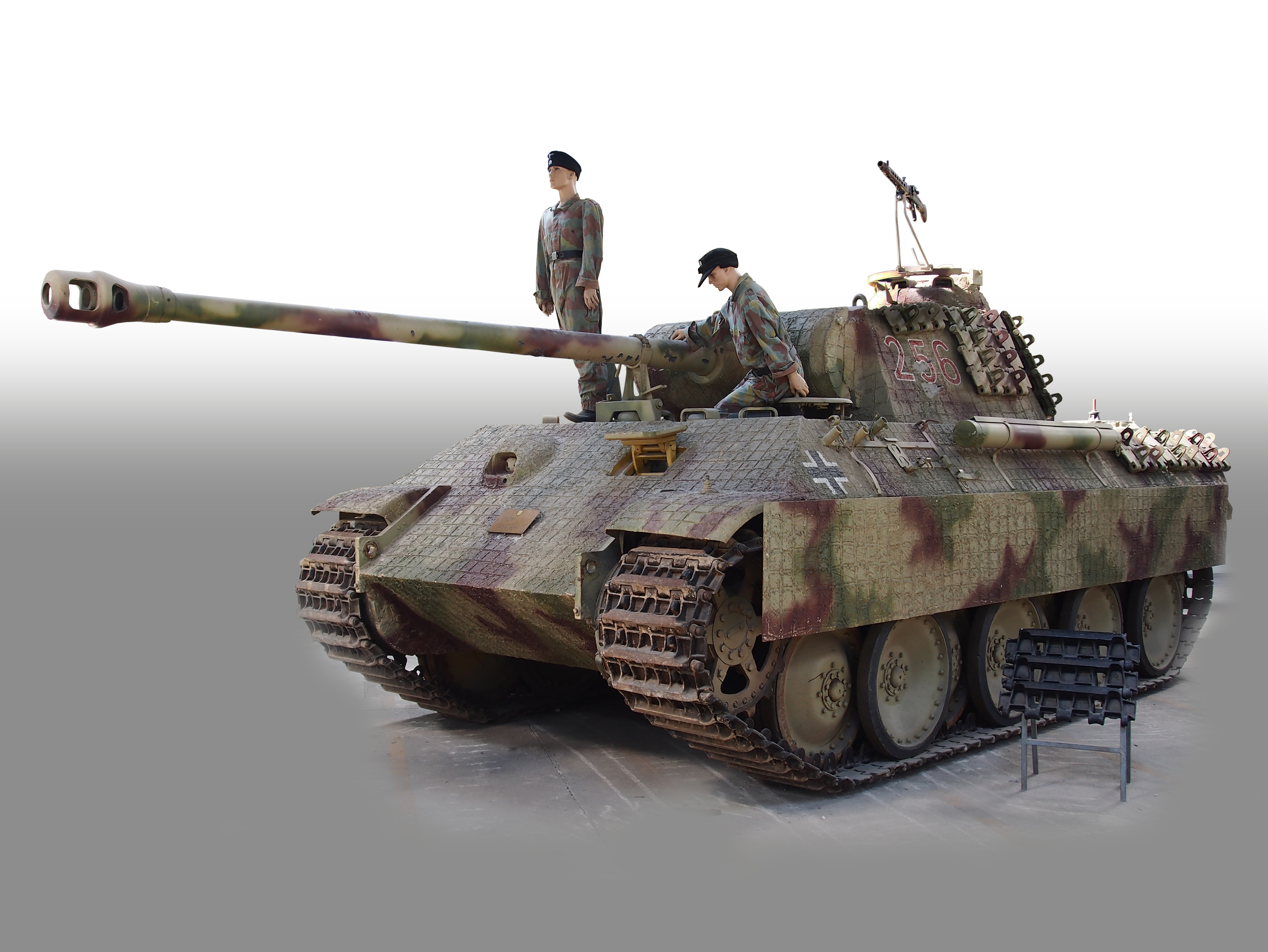
Wehrmacht tank V (Panther), "Musée des Blindés" (Frankreich)

After the horse sculptures were confiscated by the police in Bad Dürkheim, the then public prosecutor, Birgit Heß, continued to search for stolen goods and the receiver who might have been involved in the sale of Nazi art. She came across Flick, who, however, denied participation in the sale. During the search of his property, the police found an underground nuclear shelter, which was built during the Cold War and equipped with Nazi insignia. In addition to a two-meter-wide and five-meter-long, 43-tonne Panther tank they found an entire arsenal: an 8.8-centimeter anti-aircraft gun, a Torpedo, a mortar, Machine guns and assault rifles, semi-automatic and fully automatic pistols, a large amount of nitrocellulose powder in a metal box and about 1,000 rounds of ammunition.

German imperial flag

The Kiel public prosecutor's office had been investigating the case since 2017. According to media reports, it charged Flick with violation of the War Weapons Control Act and firearms law. The 'Panther' was removed in May 2015 in a complex, two-day recovery campaign with the help of an army tank-wrecker, confiscated and brought to the Putlos military training area, to prove whether the alleged demilitarization had actually taken place. The accused stated that he had properly registered all weapons. According to a certificate from the district of Plön, dated 31 October 2005, the tank allegedly lost its "war weapon status". The senior public prosecutor Birgit Heß, who was responsible at the time, stated however, that the public prosecutor nonetheless did not know of a permit that would entitle the man to possession of the confiscated objects.

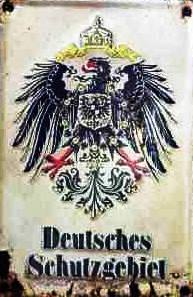
Sign "German Protectorate", on the property gate, 2015

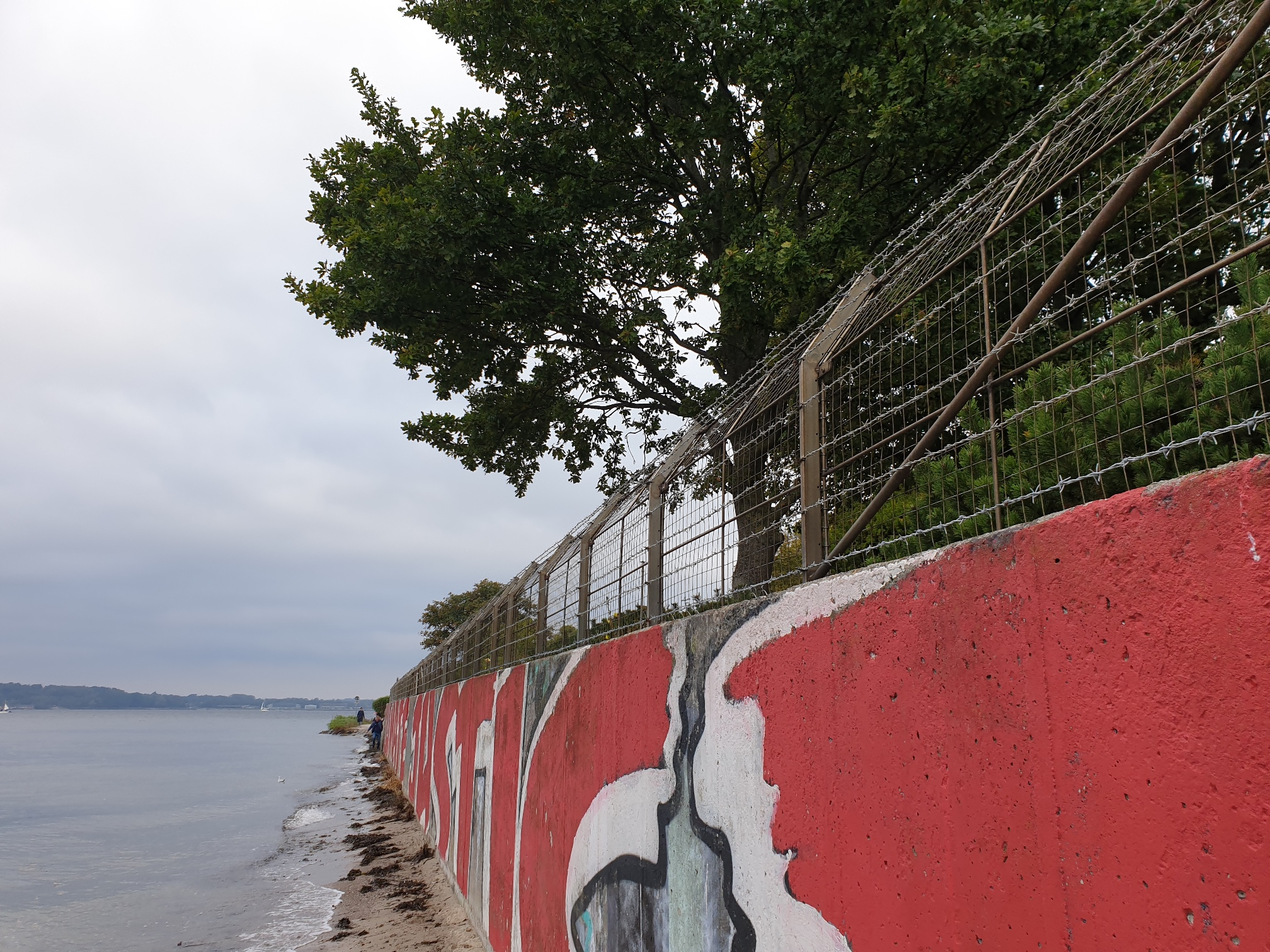
Secured Flick property, seaside, 2020

In this context, the public prosecutor's office also investigated allegations according to which the tank owner worked closely with agencies and members of the Bundeswehr during the restoration of the 'Panther'. In 2015, the Ministry of Defense confirmed that German army experts had renovated the tank for Mr. Flick with the help of the 'Wehrtechnischen Dienststelle' (Defense technical department, WID 41) in Trier, the tank museum in Munster, and the 'Wehrtechnischen Studiensammlung' (Defense engineering study collection, WTS) of the German army in Koblenz. He duly paid €28,317 for these support services. Irrespective of this, an employee of the naval arsenal (Marine-Arsenal), Kiel, is said to have been seconded for three years in the 1970s - decades before the affair surrounding the restoration of the 'Panther' tank in 2015 - to deal with a rusty tank engine (probably for a 'Tiger' tank), salvaged from the dunes in Flanders, to be restored on behalf of Flick in Kiel. In the course of the investigation it turned out that it was generally known by citizens as well as by the authorities of Heikendorf that Flick had been in possession of diverse tanks and other weapon systems of the Wehrmacht for decades. In a NDR-TV documentary from 1985, the 'Panther' that has now been removed, is to be seen driving on its own chains into the bunker.

In the previous decades, Flick apparently possessed even more tanks. Among other things, he personally drove a Wehrmacht tank with which he helped to clear the streets of Kitzeberg (a wealthy township of Heikendorf) for emergency operations during the 1978/79 snow disaster. He probably also provided neighbourhood help by pulling tree stumps out of the earth with his tank. Therefore, he was respected in his neighbourhood. However, then the 'Panzer' had been reportedly an armored personnel carrier. The latter was allegedly later-on given to a friend, who lives on the west bank of the Kiel Fjord in Düsternbrook (a wealthy township of Kiel), the same buyer, who also bought Flick's amphibious vehicle, probably a Volkswagen Schwimmwagen, with which Flick had ‘enriched’ the sailing events of the Kiel Week at least once in the 1980s.

On the other hand, according to statements by a local resident, apparently neo-Nazis with a swastika tattoo on their necks picked up a load of torpedoes, without this appearing to neither the authorities nor local residents to be questionable. In the 1970s, according to contemporary witnesses, tanks were periodically driven out of Flick's underground bunker to prevent the engines from rusting. The roar of the engines is said to have been heard from afar. At least until 2015, the sign "German Protectorates" (German: Schutzgebiete) at the entrance gate as well as the German Imperial flag, waving on the flagpole, were to be seen on the property. Similar signs are often used by the ultra right-wing grouping of the Reichsbürger movement, some of whom also live in Kitzeberg (Heikendorf).

The property is still secured by surveillance cameras and a concrete wall with barbed wire fencing on the seaside. Because of its large size, the latter has been a popular projection surface for political slogans by activists. In the 1970s it was written here in letters tall as a man, so that it could be read even by passenger ferries and cruise ships passing by: "This concentration camp belongs entirely to me (in vernacular)", today it says: "Climate Justice".

The trial in the 2015 Panzer affair at the Kiel Regional Court was delayed further and scheduled to begin in autumn 2020. After six years of proceedings against the now 84-year-old 'military collector', a relatively mild verdict was passed on 3 August 2021. The defendant was sentenced to one year and two months probation for unauthorized possession of weapons, ammunition and explosives. Because of the extraordinary duration of the proceedings, four months were considered to have been served. Flick also had to pay a fine of €250,000. The judges assessed his high age, the lack of previous convictions and his confession as mitigating the penalty. Flick was ordered to sell the tank and anti-aircraft gun within two years to a museum or a collector. Flick's lawyer Gerald Goecke was pleased and satisfied with the verdict.

In early July 2021 it also turned out that Flick is related and close friends with another 48-year-old 'gun fanatic' from Kiel as a 'nominal uncle'. The latter lives in the noble district of Düsternbrook near the Kiel Fjord. He was already targeted by the police in 1997 when they confiscated weapons from his Wehrmacht holdings. In addition, a violent explosion occurred in his house on 17 August 2020, which called the professional fire brigade on the scene. The police suspected the gun and militaria collector to have handled explosives, but could not prove anything. Since 2021 the Kiel public prosecutor's office is investigating the initial suspicion that the two 'gun freaks' were assistants of a former dentist from Westensee who murdered three people six weeks earlier in Dänischenhagen and Kiel. The murderer is said to have obtained the weapons (including an Israeli submachine gun 'Uzi') from the two 'gun fools'. The 48-year-old dealer from Düsternbrook is also said to have dismantled the weapon after the crime and secretly 'disposed of' it in various places, including in the Kiel fjord near the Möltenort U-Boat Memorial, not far from the Flick property.

== Bibliography ==
- Sandra Dassler: Nazi-Kunst aus der Reichskanzlei – Rechtsstreit um Hitlers Bronzepferde. In: Der Tagesspiegel. 14. Dezember 2015 (tagesspiegel.de).
- Roman Deininger, Friederike Zoe Grasshoff: Panzer im Keller – Schützenfest. In: Süddeutsche Zeitung. 3 July 2015 (sueddeutsche.de).
- Eckard Gehm: Nach Razzia in Heikendorf bei Kiel – Panzer in Villa: Bundeswehr half bei Instandsetzung. In: Kieler Nachrichten. 22. Juli 2015 (shz.de).
- Sven Felix Kellerhoff: Zweiter Weltkrieg – Braune Kunst – Polizei findet Hitlers verschwundene Bronze-Pferde. In: Die Welt. 20. Mai 2015 (welt.de).
- Jüttner, Julia; Siemens, Ansgar; Röbel, Sven (May 28, 2021). "Prozess gegen NS-Sammler - Wie ein betuchter Rentner einen Wehrmachtspanzer im Keller versteckte. Ein Millionär hortet Waffen und NS-Devotionalien in seiner Villa. Warum? Vor Gericht schweigt der Angeklagte". Spiegel Panorama.
- Justin Wm. Moyer, Lindsey Bever: Mystery of Hitler's missing horse statues solved. In: The Washington Post, 21 May 2015 (washingtonpost.com).
- RND/dpa (2020): Heikendorf: Prozess gegen Panzer-Sammler nicht vor Herbst. In: Kieler Nachrichten. 6 August 2020 (kn-online.de).
- Alison Smale, Jesse Coburn: Sleuth Work Leads to Discovery of Art Beloved by Hitler. In: The New York Times. 25 Juin 2015 (nytimes.com).
- Paul Wagner, Günter Schellhase: Polizei ermittelt gegen Kunstsammler – Hitlers Bronzepferde standen in Heikendorf. In: Kieler Nachrichten 24 May 2015 (kn-online.de).
- 7sur7, Char, torpille, canon antiaérien: un sympathisant nazi condamné pour possession illégale d'armes de guerre. In: 7sur7, Vilvorde; Belgique, 4 August 2021 ([archive] 7sur7, Vilvorde; Belgique)
