= J29 =

J29 may refer to:

- County Route J29 (California)
- Junkers J 29, a German experimental aircraft
- Saab J 29, a Swedish fighter aircraft
- Square gyrobicupola, a Johnson solid (J_{29})
- Toyota Supra (J29), a Japanese sports car
