= Junkers =

German aerospace and engineering company

Junkers Flugzeug- und Motorenwerke AG (JFM)
- Type: Privately held company
- Industry: aircraft industry manufacture of air and spacecraft and related machinery vehicle construction
- Founded: 1895
- Founder: Hugo Junkers
- Defunct: 1969
- Fate: Merged into Messerschmitt-Bölkow-Blohm (MBB)
- Successor: Junkers GmbH (post WW2)
- Headquarters: Dessau, Germany
- Key people: Hugo Junkers
- Number of employees: 40,000

Junkers Flugzeug- und Motorenwerke AG (JFM, earlier JCO or JKO in World War I, English: Junkers Aircraft and Motor Works) more commonly Junkers [ˈjʊŋkɐs], was a major German aircraft and aircraft engine manufacturer. It was founded in Dessau, Germany, in 1895 by Hugo Junkers, initially manufacturing boilers and radiators. During World War I and following the war, the company became famous for its pioneering all-metal aircraft. During World War II the company produced the German air force's planes, as well as piston and jet aircraft engines, albeit in the absence of its founder who had been removed by the Nazis in 1934.

== History ==
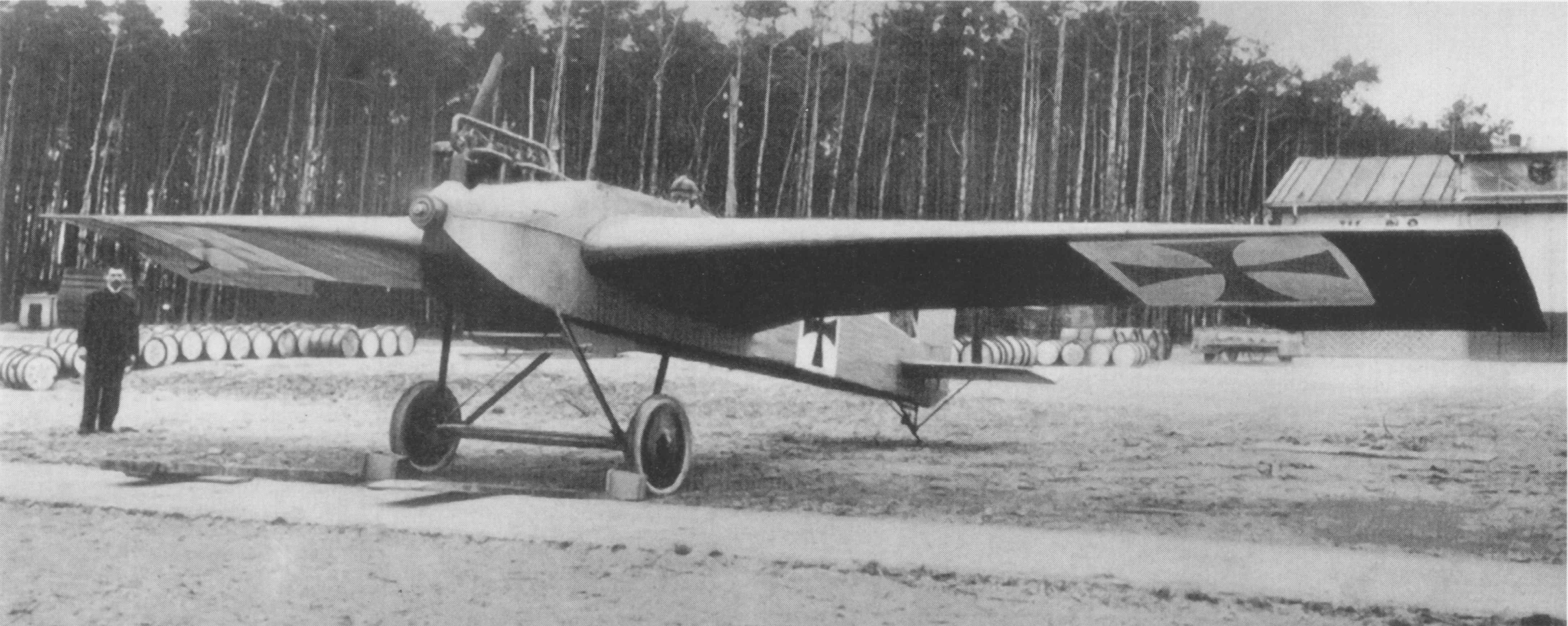
The pioneering all-metal Junkers J 1 in late 1915

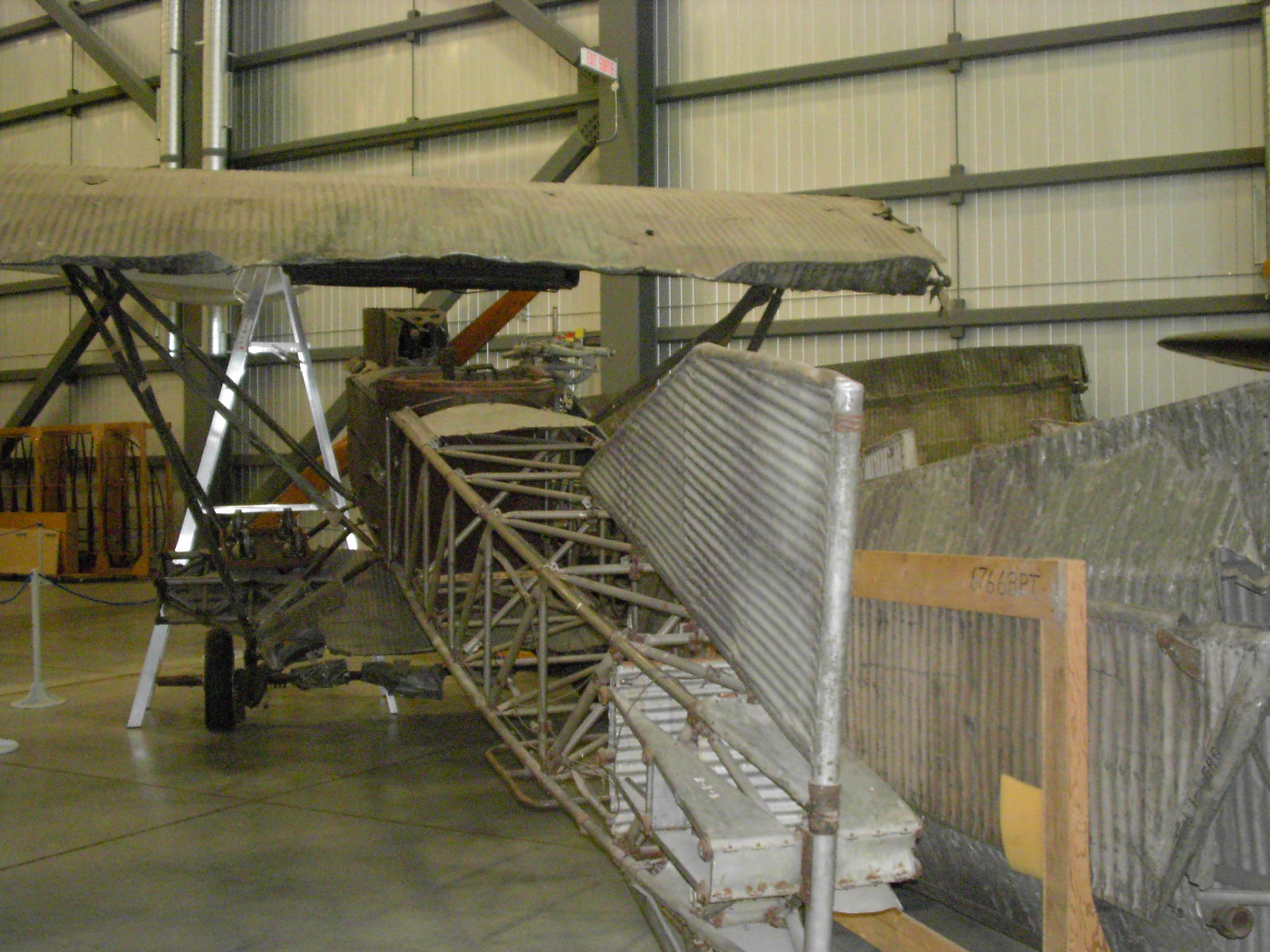
The only surviving J.I is at the Canada Aviation Museum.

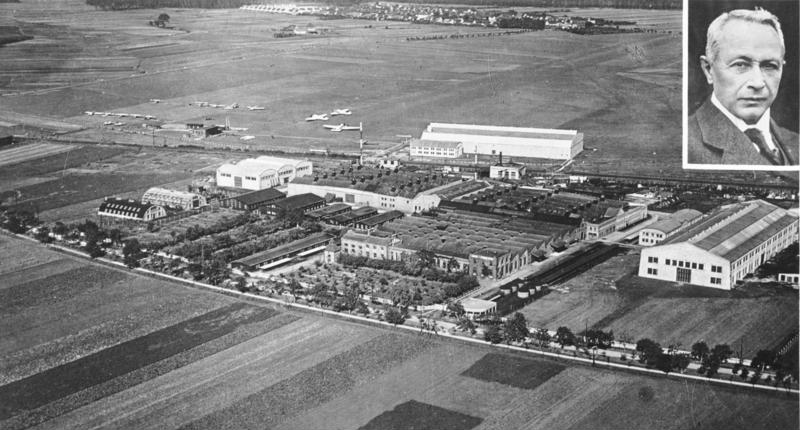
The Junkers factory in Dessau, 1928

=== Early inter-war period ===
In the immediate post-war era, Junkers used their J8 layout as the basis for the F-13, first flown on 25 June 1919 and certified airworthy in July of the same year. This four passenger monoplane was the world's first all-metal airliner. Of note, in addition to significant European sales, some twenty-five of these airplanes were delivered to North American customers under the Junkers-Larsen affiliate and were used primarily as airmail planes.

The Treaty of Versailles, signed only days after the F-13 flew, initially forbade any aircraft construction in Germany for several months. After that span of time, only the design of civilian aircraft was permitted to Germany. With a partial relocation of the Junkers firm to the Fili western suburb of Moscow, the Junkers firm was able to restart its aircraft manufacturing concern within the borders of the Soviet Union in 1922, the partly revitalized Junkers firm developed a series of progressively larger civil aircraft including the single-engined G.24 and three-engine G.31. Neither aircraft was a commercial success. With the expiration of treaty restrictions in 1926, Junkers introduced the Junkers W33 and Junkers W34 series, which did find significant commercial success via large production orders in passenger, freight hauling, and, somewhat later, military configurations. The W-33/W-34 series also set multiple aviation "firsts" including records for flight duration, flight distance, altitude, rocket-assisted take-off and inflight refueling between 1926 and 1930.

After previous study work, Junkers set up the Junkers Luftbild-Zentrale in Dessau in 1924 to produce aerial photographs for various purposes. Eight years later, due to the financial difficulties of the parent company, this branch was separated and continued to operate as Bild-Flug for a year until it was taken over by its main competitor, Hansa Luftbild.

Junkers' produced a design study in 1924 for a visit to the United States. The study outlined a four-engined 80-passenger plane, incorporating a forward canard wing, as well as a main wing, both of which were fitted above twin pylons. Called the Junkers J.1000 Super Duck passenger seating was to be provided both in the main wing and the hull sections of the craft. This Junkers design, including a scale model, was intended to illustrate an aircraft capable of trans-Atlantic operations of 8 to 10 hours and was completely revolutionary for its day.

It was in 1922 that American engineer William Bushnell Stout, and in 1924 that Soviet engineer Andrei Tupolev each adapted the Junkers corrugated duralumin airframe design technologies for their own initial examples of all-metal aircraft in their respective nations – for Stout, the Stout ST twin-engined naval torpedo bomber prototype aircraft, and for Tupolev, the Tupolev ANT-2 small passenger aircraft, who had the assistance of the Soviet government's TsAGI research center in achieving success with light-weight metal airframes.

The basic principles outlined in this design were later introduced in the Junkers G.38, which was introduced and put into regular service by Deutsche Luft Hansa. At the time of its introduction, this four-engined transport was the largest landplane in the world carrying thirty-four passengers and seven crew members. The G.38 sat some of its passengers in the wing area outboard of the fuselage, the front of which was covered with windows.

Also, in 1932, Junkers joint project with Maybach designed and built an aerodynamic car but found due to the depression that the market for high end luxury cars was saturated.

=== Financial troubles ===
Around 1931 the company suffered from a series of financial difficulties that led to the collapse of the group of companies. The existing shareholders pressured Hugo to leave the company. Hugo, however, was the patent holder on a wide variety of the technologies used in most of the existing Junkers designs, including many of their engines.

A plan was started to solve both problems by "buying out" Hugo's engine patent portfolio and placing it into the hands of a new company, the Junkers Motoren-Patentstelle GmbH, which was eventually formed in November 1932. The new company would then license the technologies back to the various companies, most notably what was then Junkers Motorenbau (one of many "Jumo" companies). However, before Junkers actually transferred his patents to the Patentstelle, the collapse of the Junkers consortium was solved by the sale of Junkers Thermo Technik GmbH to Robert Bosch GmbH, whose company still uses the brand name. Adolf Dethmann, a Communist activist and friend of Hugo, was appointed managing director.

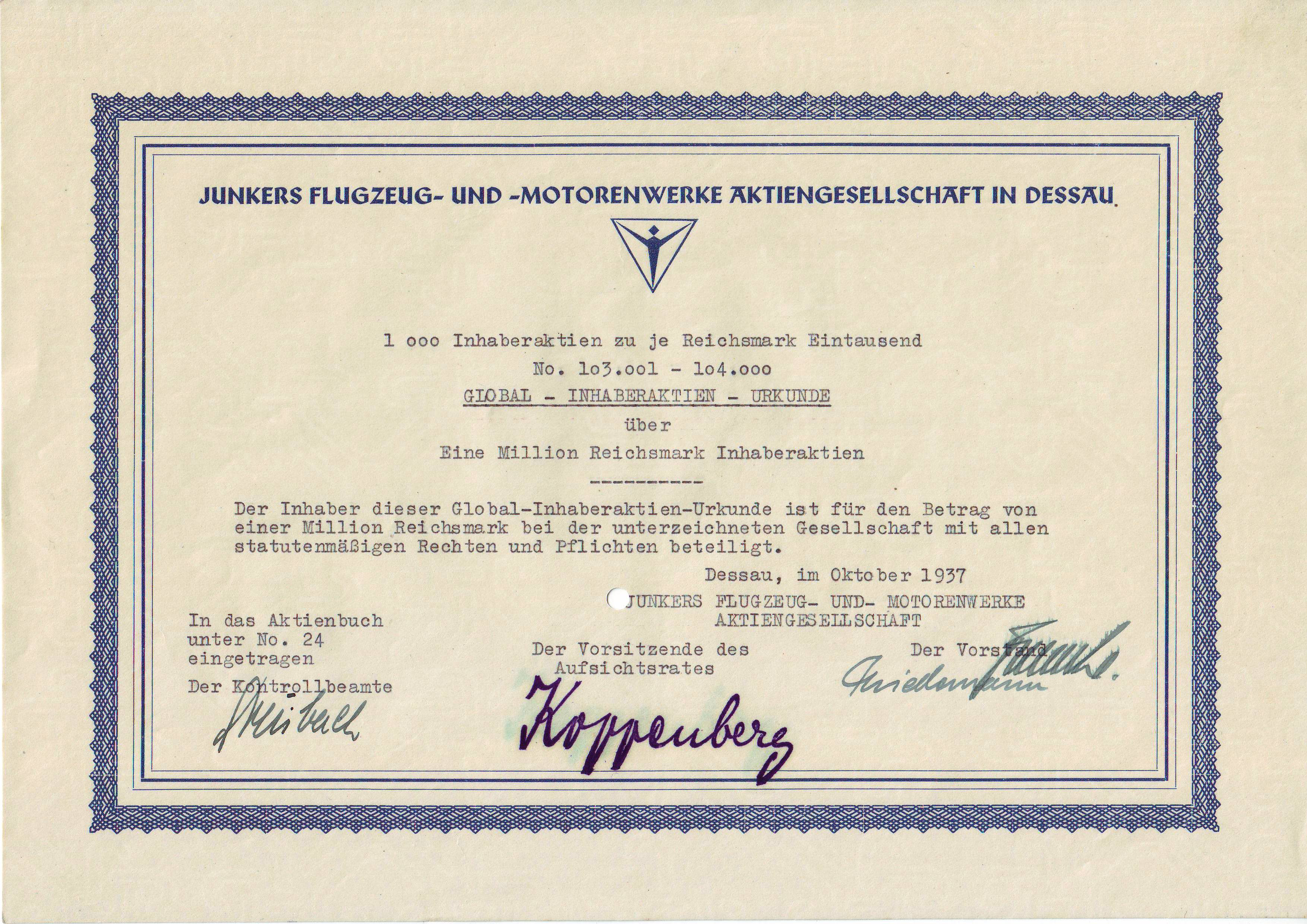
Share of the Junkers Flugzeug- und Motorenwerke AG, issued October 1937

=== Post World War II ===
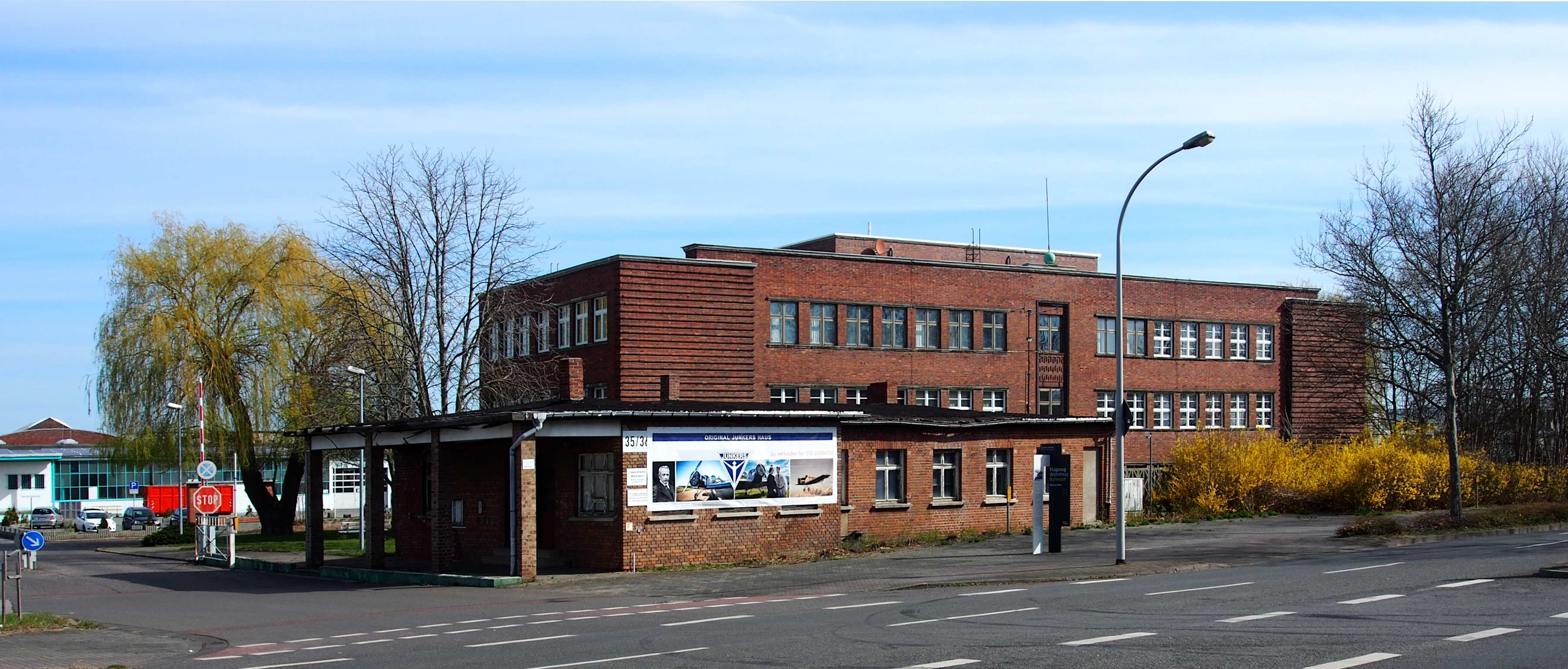
Gatehouse of former Junkers factory in Dessau

Despite significant bomb damage to its factories, the Junkers company survived the Second World War and the formation of East Germany, and was reconstituted as Junkers GmbH and eventually merged into the MBB consortium (via joint venture Flugzeug-Union-Süd between Heinkel and Messerschmitt in 1958). Messerschmitt ended the joint venture in 1965 by acquiring control of JFM AG and absorbing it in 1967. Within West Germany, Junkers GmbH was engaged in research on the future of aerospace transportation during the fifties and early-1960s. During this period, Junkers employed the famous Austrian engineer and space travel theorist, Eugen Sänger, who in 1961 completed work for the design of an advanced orbital spacecraft at Junkers. Junkers GmbH was absorbed within MBB and the Junkers name disappeared in 1969.

== Products ==
=== Aircraft ===
The Junkers firm's early aircraft were identified by the letter J for Junkers followed by an Arabic type number. From 1919 they introduced an additional sales designation using the same number but prefixed by a letter indicating the role of the aircraft:

A = Austauschflugzeug (suitable for either civil or military use),
EF = Entwurfsflugzeug (experimental aircraft),
F = Flugzeug (aircraft),
G = Großflugzeug (large aircraft),
H = aircraft built at Junkers' Moscow plant,
K = Kampfflugzeug (bomber),
S = Spezial (special),
T = Schulflugzeug (trainer aircraft),
W = Wasserflugzeug (seaplane).

Just once, the same number was used to identify two different completed types. This pair was the T 23 and G 23, both also known as J 23.

During World War I, machines in service used the regular Idflieg aircraft designation system to specify their design's purpose, also promoted by the Flugzeugmeisterei (Air Ministry), again a letter number system indicating role:

CL = two-seat ground attack,
D = single-seat biplane scout, by 1918 used for all single seat scouts,
E = single-seat monoplane scout,
J = two-seat armoured close support biplane.

The best known and most confusing example is the Junkers J 4 armored-fuselage, all-metal sesquiplane, known to the military as the Junkers J.I.

The single letter company prefix was not replaced by the twin-letter Ju prefix until 1933. This RLM system – from the Third Reich's air ministry – applied to all German manufacturers; the first Junkers aircraft to receive a Ju number was the W 33, so retrospectively it became the Ju 33. However, earlier aircraft built in Moscow like the H 21 were often described by a Ju number, e.g. Ju 21.

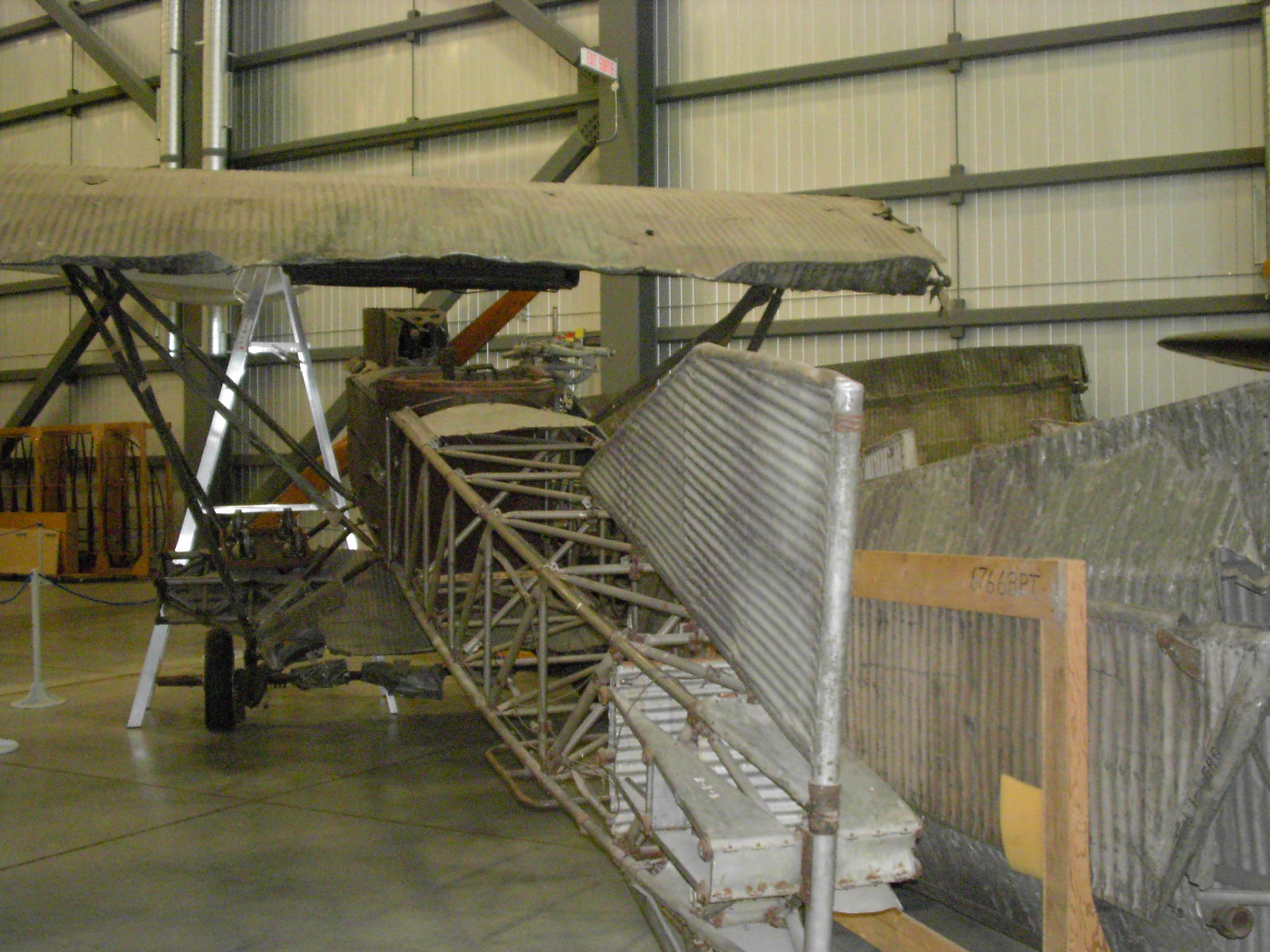
The only surviving J.I is at the Canada Aviation Museum.

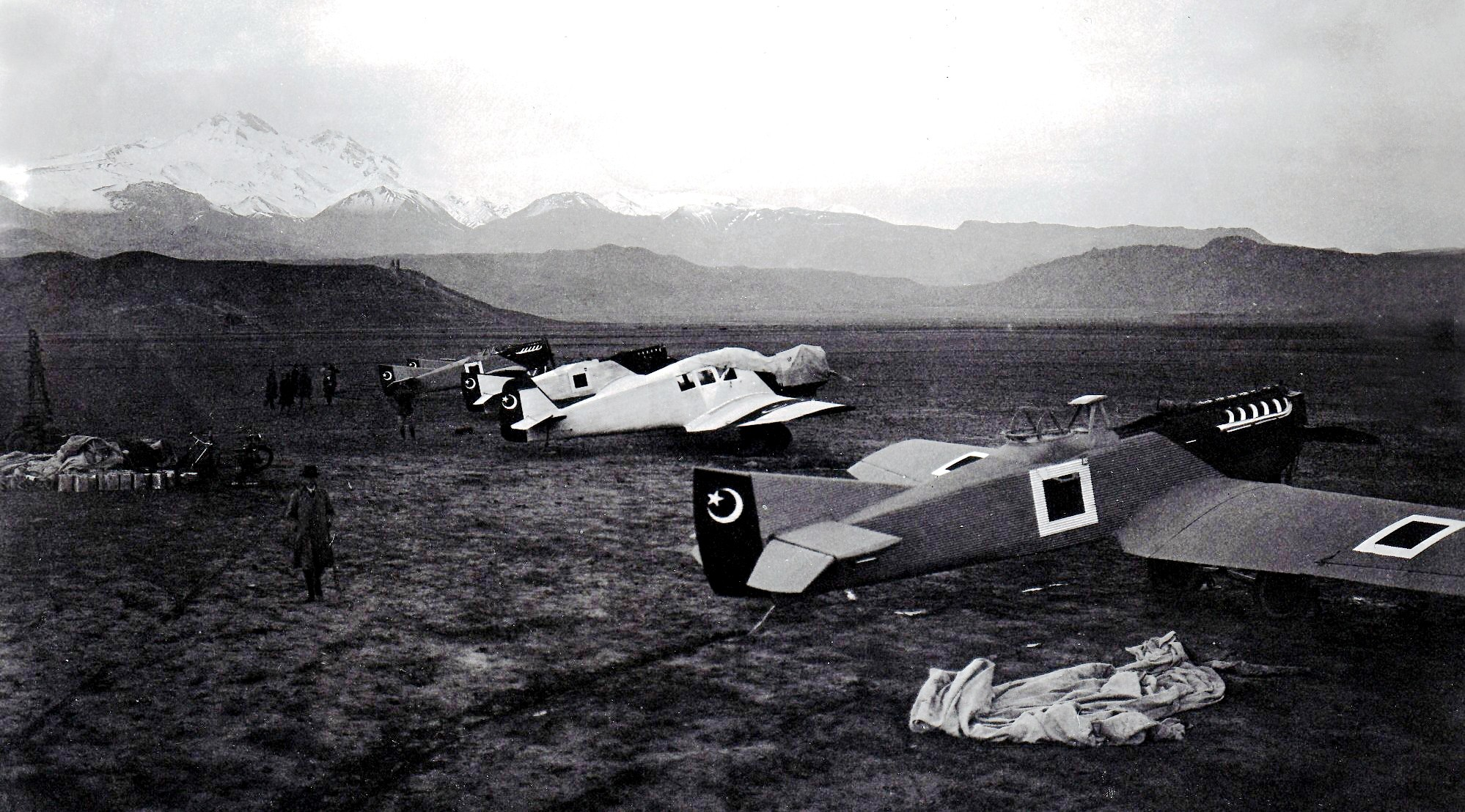
A20 aircraft, produced jointly by the Turkish Government and the Junkers in Turkey, the first delivery of which was made in Kayseri in March 1925

- Junkers J 1, (no military designation) world's first-ever full metal-structure aircraft, 1915.
- Junkers J 2, (no military designation) experimental all-metal single seater, designed as fighter, 1916.
- Junkers J 3, mid-wing monoplane, cancelled before completion, first proposed corrugated-skin duralumin design.
- Junkers J 4, (military J.I) armored-fuselage sesquiplane full metal close support aircraft, 1917
- Junkers J 5, unbuilt monoplane scout with engine behind pilot.
- Junkers J 6, unbuilt parasol monoplane scout.
- Junkers J 7, prototype for J 9, 1917.
- Junkers J 8, twin-seat development of J 7, 1917.
- Junkers J 9, (military D.I) all-duralumin single-seat fighter, built in J.9/I and J.9/II (lengthened wingspan and rear fuselage) versions, 1918.
- Junkers J 10, (military CL.I) all-duralumin monoplane close support aircraft, 1918.
- Junkers J 11, (navy C3MG, military CLS.I) floatplane version of J 10, 1918.
- Junkers J 12, prototype four-seat airliner developed from the J 10, precursor of F.13, 1919.
- Junkers F 13, passenger plane, 1919 originally J 13, sold as Junkers–Larsen in US, 1919.
- Junkers JG1, large monoplane project, 1921.
- Junkers J 15, precursor of J/K 16, 1920
- Junkers K 16, small single-engined passenger plane, alternatively known as J 16, 1922.
- Junkers J 17, improved K 16, not built.
- Junkers J 18, navy survey aircraft, not built.
- Junkers T 19, trainer and tourer, alternately known as J 19, 1922.
- Junkers A 20, light transport, 1923.
- Junkers J 21, also known as T 21 and H 21, reconnaissance aircraft for Red Army built in Russia, 1923.
- Junkers J 22, also known as H 22, for Red Army, fighter similar to J 21, 1922.
- Junkers T 23, sports mono- or biplane, 1923.
- Junkers G 23, 3-engined 10-seat airliner, 1923.
- Junkers G 24, enlarged G 23, 1925.
- Junkers F 24, single-engined development of G 23, 1928.
- Junkers A 25, A 20s re-engined with Junkers L2 engines, 1926.
- Junkers T 26, training and sports aircraft, 1925.
- Junkers T 27, a re-engined T 26, 1925.
- Junkers J 28, two-seat version of T.21, not built.
- Junkers J 29, sports monoplane, double wing development aircraft, 1925.
- Junkers K 30, military version of G 24, 1930.
- Junkers G 31, 15 seat airliner, 1926.
- Junkers A 32, experimental monoplane, 1926.
- Junkers W 33, single-engined light transport, (developed from F.13) 1926.

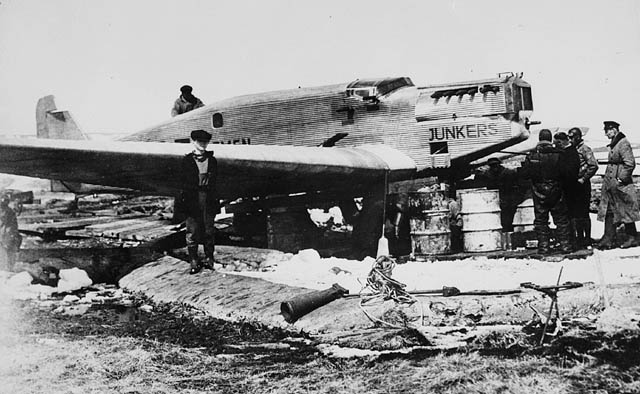
Junkers W33 Bremen after the first East-West Atlantic crossing

- Junkers W 34, single-engine light transport + reconnaissance (development of W33), 1933.
- Junkers A 35, postal, training and military aircraft, 1926.
- Junkers S 36, twin-engined mail plane, 1927.
- Junkers K 37, military version of S 36, 1928.
- Junkers G.38, four-engined commercial transport, world's largest landplane when built, 1929.
- Junkers K 39, experimental reconnaissance-bomber (development of A 32), 1927.
- Junkers J 40, prototype large flying boat airliner (G.38 derived), 1926.
- Junkers W 41, an F 24 re-engined with a Junkers Fo 4 diesel engine, 1928.
- Junkers R 42, designation for Swedish built K 30s.
- Junkers K 43, reconnaissance monoplane, 1927.
- Junkers J 44, prototype replacement for A 35, 1927.
- Junkers K 45, a single Ju 52 converted to a torpedo bomber, 1932.
- Junkers Ju 46, catapult mailplane derived from W 34.
- Junkers K 47, close support aircraft, prototype of K 48, 1927.
- Junkers A 48, production dive bomber, 1928.
- Junkers Ju 49, high altitude research aircraft, 1931.
- Junkers A50, sports monoplane, 1929.
- Junkers K 51, Ki-20 heavy bomber for Japan, c. 1934.
- Junkers Ju 52, single-engined precursor to Ju 52/3m, 1930
- Junkers Ju 52/3m Tante Ju (Auntie Ju), passenger airliner and freighter, used as transport + bomber during World War II, 1932.
- Junkers K 53, designation for Swedish built A 35's.
- Junkers J 54, prototype replacement for A 35, 1929.
- Junkers J 56, prototype replacement for K 16, 1930.
- Junkers J 58, prototype replacement for F 13 & W 34, 1929.
- Junkers Ju 60, low wing high speed airliner, 1932.
- Junkers K 85, proposed torpedo bomber version of Ju 86 for Sweden, 1933.
- Junkers Ju 85, prototype twin-engined bomber similar to Ju 86, not built.
- Junkers Ju 86, twin-engined airliner, bomber + reconnaissance, 1934.
- Junkers Ju 87, Stuka, dive-bomber, 1935.
- Junkers Ju 88, bomber + reconnaissance + night-fighter.
- Junkers Ju 89, heavy transport, heavy bomber (prototype), 1936.
- Junkers Ju 90, four-engined airliner, transport developed from Ju 89, 1937.
- Junkers Ju 160, low wing high speed airliner developed from Ju 60, 1934.
- Junkers Ju 186, four-engined high-altitude prototype version of Ju 86, not built.
- Junkers Ju 187, close support aircraft project, cancelled after mock-up built.
- Junkers Ju 188, Rächer, bomber, 1941.
- Junkers Ju 248, re-designation of Me 263.
- Junkers Ju 252, transport developed from the EF 77, 1941.
- Junkers Ju 268, parasite bomber project, 1944.
- Junkers Ju 286, six-engined high-altitude version of Ju 86, not built.
- Junkers Ju 287, prototype jet-engined bomber with swept forward wings, 1945.
- Junkers Ju 288, bomber (prototype), 1941.
- Junkers Ju 290, transport, patrol, 1941.
- Junkers Ju 322, Mammut (Mammoth), transport glider (prototype), 1941.
- Junkers Ju 352, Herkules (Hercules), transport, 1944.
- Junkers Ju 388, Störtebeker, reconnaissance + night-fighter, 1943.
- Junkers Ju 390, six-engine long-range Amerikabomber competitor (prototype) developed from Ju 290, 1943.
- Junkers Ju 452, derivative of Ju 252 in wooden construction
- Junkers Ju 488, proposed heavy bomber design.
- Junkers J.1000, large flying-wing airliner, 1924.

==== Experimental ====
- Junkers EFo 008, four-engine high-altitude jet bomber
- Junkers EFo 009, Hubjäger (Lift-Fighter), jet fighter project
- Junkers EFo 010, two underwing-mounted jet engines; record aircraft design
- Junkers EFo 011, twin-engine jet fighter
- Junkers EFo 012, four-engine jet bomber
- Junkers EFo 015, similar to EFo 008, modified nose section
- Junkers EFo 017, twin-engine jet fighter (similar to Me 262)
- Junkers EFo 018, four-engine jet bomber, engines under wing
- Junkers EFo 019, twin-engine jet bomber, engines integrated into wing
- Junkers EFo 021, 40-passenger double-deck trans-Atlantic airliner project, 1938.
- Junkers EFo 022, record aircraft developed from the EFo 018
- Junkers EF 017, single-engine, three seat military aircraft, later A 32 and K 39
- Junkers EF 024, single-engine fighter, later A 48
- Junkers EF 029, high-altitude aircraft, later Ju 49
- Junkers EF 030, single-engine airliner, later W 41 (and possibly Ju 52)
- Junkers EF 031, twin-seat sport aircraft, later A 50
- Junkers EF 034, four-seat traveling aircraft, Luftlimousine (flying limousine), 1929.
- Junkers EF 037, twin-engine military aircraft, 1930.
- Junkers EF 043, wind tunnel test model
- Junkers EF 048, twin-engine multipurpose military aircraft, K 37 development, 1933.
- Junkers EF 049, twin engine airliner, further development of Ju 52/1m, 1933.
- Junkers EF 050, VTOL design study, similar to the Fa 269
- Junkers EF 052, AFI design study of K 85
- Junkers EF 053, early design of EF 100
- Junkers EF 055, Ju 287 design study
- Junkers EF 056, Ju 287 design study
- Junkers EF 057, Ju 287 design study
- Junkers EF 058, Ju 287 design study
- Junkers EF 059, Ju 88 design study
- JUnkers EF 060, early design for EF 127/EF 128.
- Junkers EF 061, high-altitude fighter + reconnaissance (prototype), 1936.
- Junkers EF 062, early EF 128 design study
- Junkers EF 063, early EF 128 design study
- Junkers EF 065, possible early EF 082 design study, 1939.
- Junkers EF 066, Ju 287 design study
- Junkers EF 067, Ju 287 design study
- Junkers EF 068, Ju 287 design study
- Junkers EF 071, aerodynamic wing tip test model
- Junkers EF 072, early EF 077 design study
- Junkers EF 073, Ju 288 design study
- Junkers EF 077, Ju 252 design study
- Junkers EF 082, combat battle aircraft project.
- Junkers EF 094, design designation for Ju 322.
- Junkers EF 100, six-engine, wide-body transatlantic airliner, 1940
- Junkers EF 101, Mistel aircraft design
- Junkers EF 112, twin-boom ground attack aircraft project, 1942.
- Junkers EF 115, bomber project with four Jumo 211 engines at front and rear or 2 jet engines at rear
- Junkers EF 116, W-wing jet bomber project, 1943.
- Junkers EF 122, four engine Ju 287 design study, later Ju 287
- Junkers EF 125, two engine Ju 287 design study, later EF 140
- Junkers EF 126 Lilli, 1944 pulsejet fighter project, completed post-war in the USSR.
- Junkers EF 127 Walli, rocket powered version of EF 126.
- Junkers EF 128, jet-engine interceptor project
- Junkers EF 130, four-engine flying wing jet bomber project, 1943.
- Junkers EF 131, six-engine development of Ju 287, completed post-war in USSR.
- Junkers EF 132, heavy bomber, partly built in USSR but not completed.
- Junkers EF 133, nothing known; probably not used
- Junkers EF 134, nothing known; probably not used
- Junkers EF 135, development of EF 130
- Junkers EF 136, nothing known; probably not used
- Junkers EF 137, jet fighter design (according to CIA report), 1943
- Junkers EF 138, nothing known; probably not used
- Junkers EF 139, nothing known; probably not used

==== Designations used exclusively in the Soviet Union ====
- Junkers EF 140, twin-engine jet bomber, development of EF 131; completed post-war in USSR.
- Junkers EF 145, possibly a Ju 88 or Ju 388 testbed at OKB-1
- Junkers EF 150, twin-engine jet bomber, further development of EF 140; largely Russian designed and completed post-war in USSR.

=== Aircraft engines ===
All Junkers diesel engines were two stroke, opposed piston designs, an arrangement he invented in the early 1890s. It was intended to provide an alternative to Nicholaus Otto's patented four stroke which would run on low grade fuels such as blast furnace waste gases. By 1896 Junkers engines were generating electrical power in steelworks.

- Junkers Fo2, horizontal, petrol, c.1923.
- Junkers L1, petrol, c. 1924.
- Junkers L2, petrol, 1925.
- Junkers L5, enlarged L 2, petrol, 1925.
- Junkers Fo3, diesel, 1926.
- Junkers L55, "double L5" (V12), petrol, 1927
- Junkers L7, small version of L2, petrol; not flown.
- Junkers Fo4, diesel, commercially called the Junkers SL1, 1928.
- Junkers L8, petrol, geared, higher power development of L5, 1929.
- Junkers L88, "double L8" (V12), petrol.
- Jumo 204, development of the SL1, initially referred to as the Jumo 4, 1930.
- Jumo 205, diesel, reduced displacement version of the Jumo 204, initially known as the Jumo 5, 1933.
- Jumo 206, diesel, higher power version of 205, 1936.
- Jumo 207, diesel, supercharged version of 205, 1939.
- Jumo 208, diesel, enlarged variant of 205, c.1940
- Jumo 209, diesel, unbuilt development of 207/208
- Jumo 210, initially known as L10, petrol inverted V12, c. 1932.
- Jumo 211, petrol, inverted V12, enlarged variant of 210, 1936.
- Jumo 212, petrol, projected inverted V24 with two Jumo 211 engines.
- Jumo 213, petrol, inverted V12, revised, improved version of 211, 1940.
- Jumo 218, diesel, unbuilt 12 cylinder version with two 208 engines.
- Jumo 222, petrol, 24-cylinder, 6-bank radial, 1939.
- Jumo 223, diesel, experimental 24 cylinder with four 207 engines arranged in a box shape.
- Jumo 224, diesel, higher power version of 223, development continued in the Soviet Union.
- Jumo 225, petrol, projected 36-cylinder, multi-bank radial developed from the 222.
- Junkers 109-004, turbojet, 1940.
- Junkers 109-012, turbojet, few completed by Soviets, 1946.
- Junkers 109-022, turboprop, project completed by Soviets, 1950.

== See also ==
- Jägerstab (Fighter Staff)
- List of RLM aircraft designations
- Rüstungsstab (Armament Staff)

== Bibliography ==
- Kay, Antony (2004). Junkers Aircraft & engines 1913-1945. London: Putnam Aeronautical Books. ISBN 0-85177-985-9.
