= Junkers T 23 =

T 23
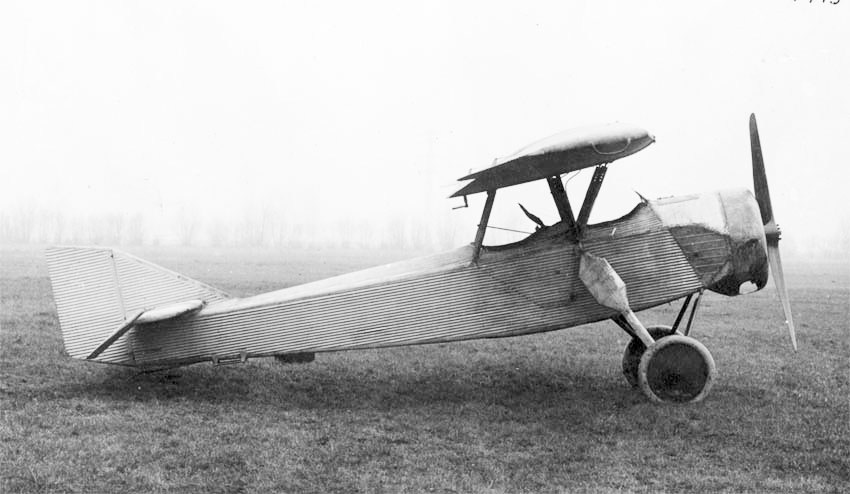

General information
- Type: Experimental training and touring aircraft
- National origin: Germany
- Manufacturer: Junkers Flugzeug Werke AG
- Number built: 4

History
- First flight: 14 September 1923

The Junkers T 23 was a two-seat, single-engined experimental training aircraft, built in Germany in the early 1920s. It could be configured either as a parasol winged monoplane or as a biplane to compare handling characteristics. 4 were constructed.

== Design and development ==
The Junkers T 23 was one of a small group of aircraft that could be configured as a monoplane or a biplane. The monoplane form, designated T 23E (E for Eindecker), was a parasol winged aircraft; the biplane, T 23D (Doppeldecker), was a sesquiplane. It was a larger, two-seat development of the purely parasol Junkers T 19. It had an experimental role, as well as being an attempt to enter the light aircraft market, which was to compare the handling characteristics of the monoplane with those of the biplane with its lower wing loading to see if the former could provide the forgiving behaviour required of a training aircraft.

In monoplane form, the T 23 had much in common with the T 19 and was built mostly from duralumin with a tubular-membered frame covered by corrugated sheet. It had a wing of similar form to the T 19, with a centre section with a constant chord centre section and outboard taper on both edges, plus ailerons with extended curved trailing edges. Its span, though, was increased by 2.50 m. The forward V cabane struts joining the centre section to upper fuselage longerons were similar to those of the T 19, but the T 23 had a pair of single rear struts more like those of the T 21. The parasol wing was a typically Junkers cantilever structure requiring no outboard struts on the T 2E, but on the T 23D the lower wing was mounted below the fuselage and braced to the upper one by a pair of vertical V struts near the lower wing tips. The lower wing had a span only 77% that of the upper one, increasing the total wing area by 57% and adding 75 kg to the structural weight.

The tapered fuselage was flat sided, with the pilot's cockpit placed under the leading edge, with a second cockpit immediately behind and under the wing. The latter was accessed via the starboard side door. The tailplane was mounted on top of the fuselage and carried horn balanced elevators. The fin was triangular, carrying a flat-topped rudder which extended down to the bottom of the fuselage in a cut-out between the elevators; the latter were aerodynamically balanced, but the rudder was not. The main undercarriage legs, with prominent shock absorbers, were mounted on the upper fuselage longerons. Two bracing struts reached forward to the lower fuselage below the engine, and the wheels were linked by a hinged axle centrally mounted to the lower fuselage with further struts. The T 23 was powered by an 80 hp (60 kW) Le Rhône rotary engine, enclosed in a fully circular cowling of moderate chord, driving a two-bladed propeller.

== Operational history ==
The T 23 first flew on 14 September 1923 as a biplane. After a few months of testing, it was converted to the monoplane configuration. Compared with the biplane, the T 23E had the expected higher landing and take-off speeds, together with longer take-off distances, associated with the higher wing loading. It was faster by 15 km/h and could carry a payload about 9% greater. All four T 24s built were sold to flying clubs after the experiments were over.

== Variants ==
Junkers T 23D
(D - Doppeldecker - biplane) The biplane version of the aircraft.
Junkers T 23E
(E - Eindecker - monoplane) The monoplane version of the aircraft with the lower wing not fitted.
Junkers T 26
An aerodynamically refined version of the T 23, powered by an air-cooled Junkers L1a 62 kW (83 hp) 6-cylinder inline engine. The latter was mounted in a circular cowling like that used on the T 19, its diameter determined by the large circular blower on the front of the L1a, with cylinder heads exposed. This installation increased the length by 280 mm (11 in). Like the T 23, it came in D and E configurations. Slightly slower than the T 23 but almost double the range (345 km, 214 mi). It was again too expensive for flying schools. It first flown 23 October 1923. No more than 11 were built.
Junkers T 27
A single T 26D was engined with a 95 kW (128 hp), 9-cylinder Clerget 9Z, flying in 1925.

== Specifications (T 23E) ==
Data from Kay 2004 p.47

General characteristics

- Crew: 1
- Capacity: 1 passenger
- Length: 7.26 m (23 ft 10 in)
- Wingspan: 13.5 m (44 ft 3 in)
- Height: 3.02 m (9 ft 11 in)
- Wing area: 21.2 m^{2} (228 sq ft)
- Empty weight: 515 kg (1,135 lb)
- Gross weight: 765 kg (1,687 lb)
- Powerplant: 1 × Le Rhône rotary, 60 kW (80 hp)

Performance

- Maximum speed: 140 km/h (83 mph, 72 kn)
- Cruise speed: 109 km/h (68 mph, 59 kn)
- Range: 180 km (110 mi, 97 nmi)
- Service ceiling: 4,000 m (13,100 ft) absolute
