= Junkers K 37 =

S 36 and K 37
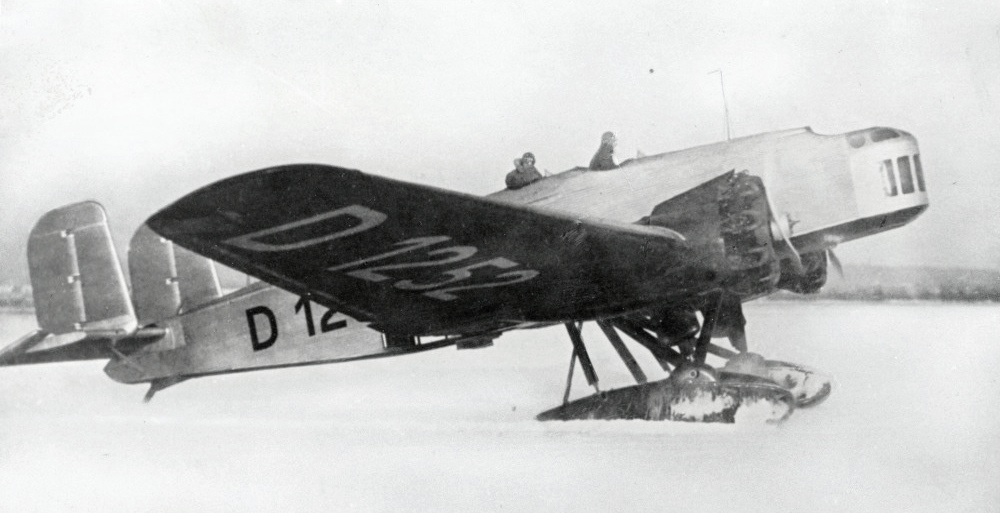

General information
- Type: Mail plane, later multi-role military aircraft
- National origin: Germany
- Manufacturer: Junkers
- Designer: Ernst Zindel
- Number built: 2

History
- First flight: 5 September 1927

The Junkers S 36 was a twin-engine mail plane developed in Germany in the late 1920s that was further developed in Sweden as a multi-role military aircraft, albeit unsuccessfully, under the designation K 37. The design itself was a low-wing cantilever monoplane of largely conventional design, featuring twin tails and fixed, tailwheel undercarriage. Construction was metal throughout and skinned, in typical Junkers fashion, with corrugated duralumin. The engines were mounted in nacelles on the wings, and the crew was accommodated in three open cockpits, including one in the very nose of the aircraft.

== Design and development ==
This design lent itself readily to military applications, and the open cockpit in the nose offered an ideal position for a crewman to act as an observer, bombardier and/or nose gunner. The S 36 prototype was flown to Sweden, where it was militarised by Junkers subsidiary AB Flygindustri at Limhamn. Proposed as a fighter or reconnaissance-bomber, the K 37 could operate at altitudes unattainable by other fighters of the day, rendering it effectively immune from interception. The type was demonstrated in civil form at the "Aerial Garden Party" at Heston Aerodrome in July 1929, and in military form as a model at the Olympia Aero Show, complete with a dummy observer with swivelling machine gun to demonstrate the field of fire.

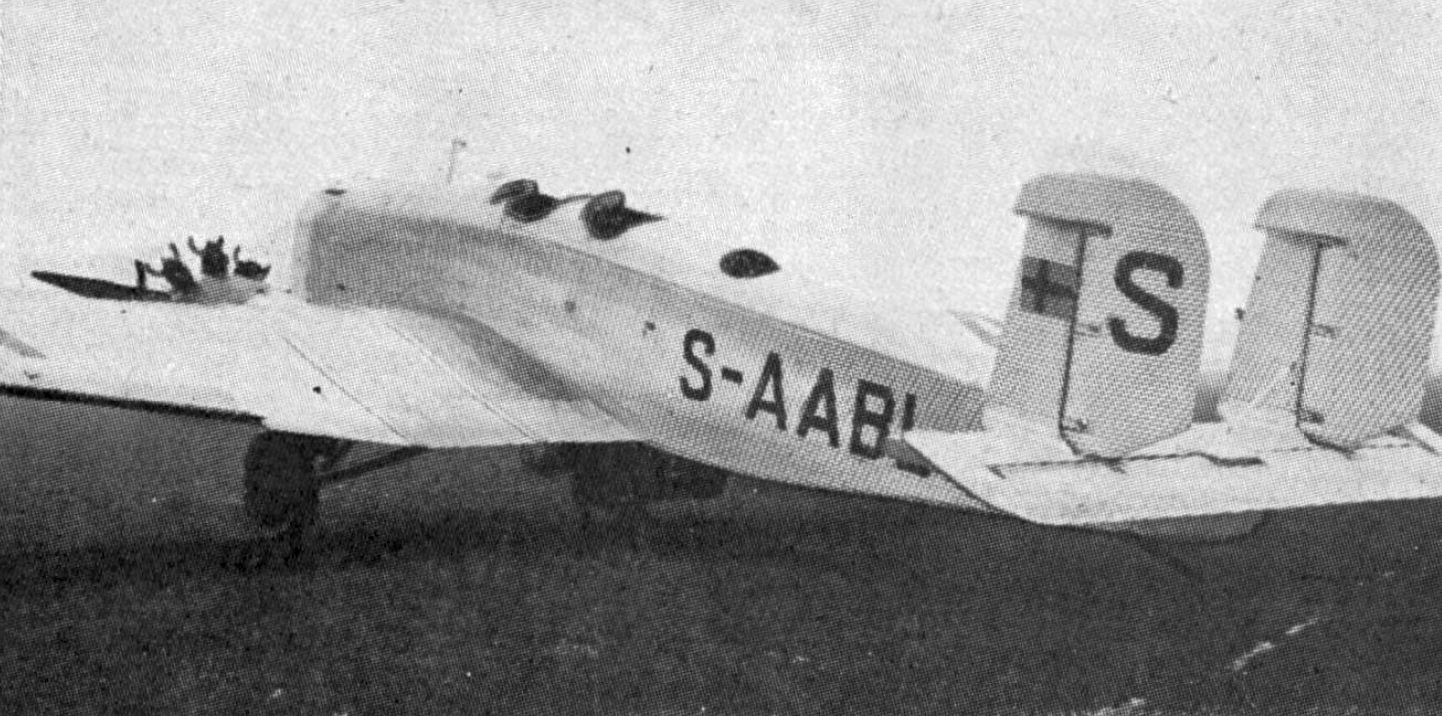
Junkers S 36 photo from L'Aéronautique December,1927

No sales resulted, and the development of new and more capable fighter aircraft negated the advantages offered by the type. The Japanese Army Air Force, however, was interested sufficiently in the type for Mitsubishi to purchase manufacturing rights in 1931, and AB Flygindustri also provided one or two pattern aircraft. A K 37 was operated with success during the Invasion of Manchuria and led the Army to order heavy and light bombers from Mitsubishi based on the design. These were developed as the Ki-1 and Ki-2 respectively, the former sharing little with the Junkers design other than its general configuration, but the latter featuring wings essentially the same as the K 37 fitted with extra ailerons.

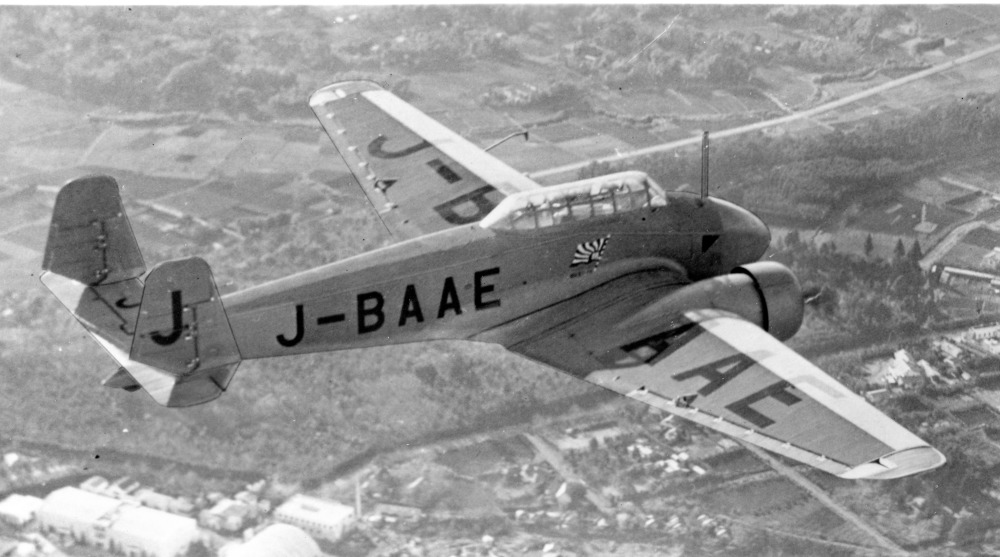
The Japanese version of the K 37, Ki-2. The photo shows a Ki-2 II that has been converted into a newspaper long-range communicator.

== Specifications (K 37) ==
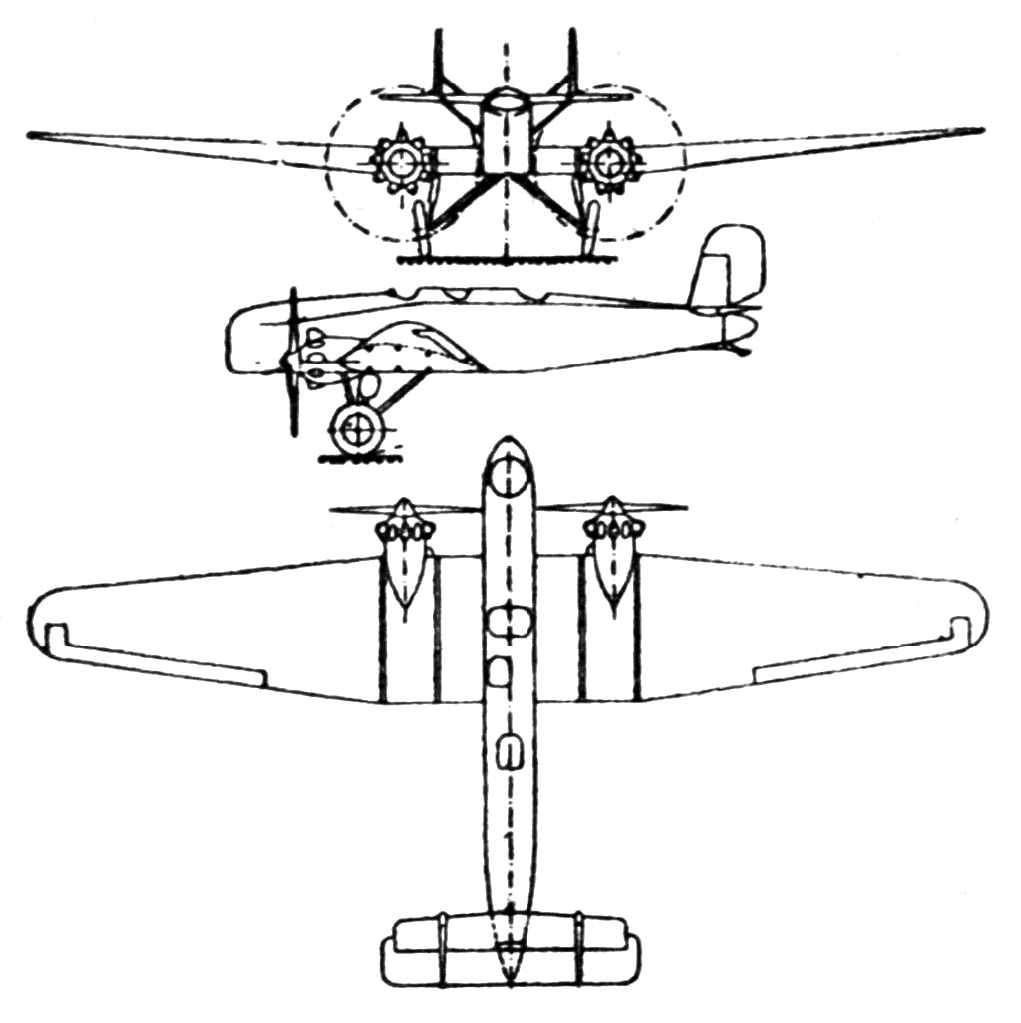
Junkers S 36 3-view drawing from Le Document aéronautique August,1928

General characteristics

- Crew: Three
- Length: 37 ft 5 in (11.40 m)
- Wingspan: 65 ft 9 in (20.05 m)
- Height: 15 ft 1 in (4.60 m)
- Wing area: 583 sq ft (54.2 m^{2})
- Empty weight: 5,720 lb (2,600 kg)
- Gross weight: 9,900 lb (4,500 kg)
- Powerplant: 2 × Siemens-built Bristol Jupiter VI , 590 hp (440 kW) each

Performance

- Maximum speed: 140 mph (224 km/h, 120 kn)
- Range: 530 mi (850 km, 460 nmi)
- Service ceiling: 23,000 ft (7,000 m)

Armament

- 3 × 7.7 mm (.303 in) machine guns
- 500 kg (1,102 lb) of bombs

== Bibliography ==
- Passingham, Malcolm (February 1999). "Les bombardiers de l'Armée japonaise (1920–1935)" [Japanese Army Bombers (1920–1935)]. Avions: Toute l'aéronautique et son histoire (in French) (71): 32–38. ISSN 1243-8650.
- Taylor, Michael J. H. (1989). Jane's Encyclopedia of Aviation. London: Studio Editions. p. 546. ISBN 0-7106-0710-5.
- Hugo Junkers homepage
- Уголок неба
- "Aerial Garden Party at Heston". Flight: 800. 25 July 1929.
- "Miscellaneous and Foreign Exhibits at Olympia". Flight: 861. 8 August 1929.
