= Junkers J 5 =

German fighter project

Junkers J 5

The Junkers J 5 was a designation assigned to several fighter aircraft designs.

== Variants ==
In early 1917, Junkers developed at least two cantilever wing monoplane fighter aircraft designs based on the J4.

=== J 5I ===
The first design, known as the J 5I, was to have a Siemens Sh2 or Oberursel UR.II engine behind the cockpit.

=== J 5II ===
The second design was to have the engine in front of the pilot.

=== J 5III (J 6) ===
A third design was also developed under the designation J 5III (later J 6) with a Mercedes D.IIIa and a parasol wing.

== Links ==
- Junkers J5 (Hugo Junkers Homepage)

== Bibliography ==
- Owers, Colin A. (2018). Junkers Aircraft of WWI: Volume 2: Junkers J.5–J.11: A Centennial Perspective on Great War Airplanes. Great War Aviation Centennial Series. Vol. 31. n.p.: Aeronaut Books. ISBN 978-1-935881-66-7.
