= Junkers J.1000 =

Conceptual German large flying-wing airliner

J.1000 (design study only)
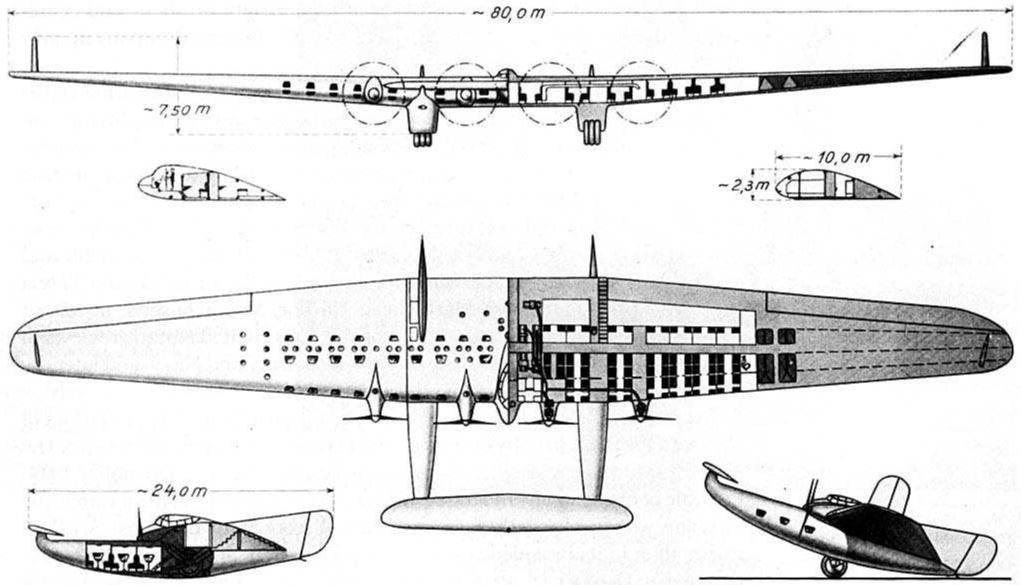
- Diagram of the planned Junkers J.1000

General information
- Type: Transport
- Manufacturer: Junkers
- Designer: Otto Mader
- Number built: 0

The Junkers J.1000 was an exercise in aeronautical design produced by the Junkers company of Germany in the mid-1920s. No airplane was ever produced. The design was led by Otto Mader who was also responsible for such Junkers aircraft as the J.1, which was the first all-metal aircraft to enter mass production.

== Design ==
The design was extremely advanced for its day, indeed revolutionary. The design envisioned a four-engined near-flying wing capable of carrying eighty to 100 passengers and a crew of ten across the Atlantic Ocean. As designed, this proposed airplane consisted of twin fuselages which were connected by a pair of canard wings. The smaller fore wing was attached to the very front of the fuselages. The massive main wing sat on top of the twin fuselages, located behind the fore wing and approximately two-thirds of the way towards the twin tails of the craft. The main wing was designed to internally house the passengers and crew. There were four vertical stabilizers, two attached to each of the fuselage sections and two just inboard from the wingtips. A small cockpit protruded from the center of the main wing between the two fuselages.

A model was made in 1923 by Junkers, followed by drawings in 1925 of the wing cabins, then in 1926 of the cross passages.

The dimensions were impressive, even by today's standards. The span of the main wing was over 260 feet as compared to today's Boeing 747 which has a wingspan of 196 feet. The main wing was 24 feet thick at its greatest point allowing ample headroom for standing passengers and crew. The overall length of the craft was some 80 feet. With projected flight times of up to 10 hours, sleeping accommodations were also built into the massive main wing.

== History ==
The J.1000 design project was initiated by company founder Hugo Junkers specifically for a promotional trip to the United States. During their 1924 visit with potential U.S. investors, Junkers and Ernst Zindel, chief designer at Junkers, proposed the J.1000 as a trans-Atlantic commercial transport. To sell their proposed craft, they brought design blueprints, renderings of the completed airplane as well as a model aircraft. Mock-ups of the interior cabins were set up at Junkers headquarters in Dessau Germany and photographs of them were included in these discussions. A proposed air route was also discussed connecting Europe and the United States through Iceland, Greenland and the Atlantic coast of Canada.

Not surprisingly, U.S. investor reaction was minimal. This futuristic craft was easily twenty-five years ahead of its time. Given the lack of investor interest, Junkers did not pursue this venture beyond this single visit to the United States. Design features of the J.1000 however were incorporated into later aircraft. For example, the concept of incorporating the passenger cabin within the main wing was again seen in the Junkers G.38 which first flew some five years later in 1929.

== Bibliography ==
- Zuerl, Walter (1941). Deutsche Flugzeug Konstrukteure. München, Germany: Curt Pechstein Verlag.
