= Möltenort U-Boat Memorial =

Submarine warfare memorial near Kiel, Germany

Coordinates: 54.3794°N 10.1947°E

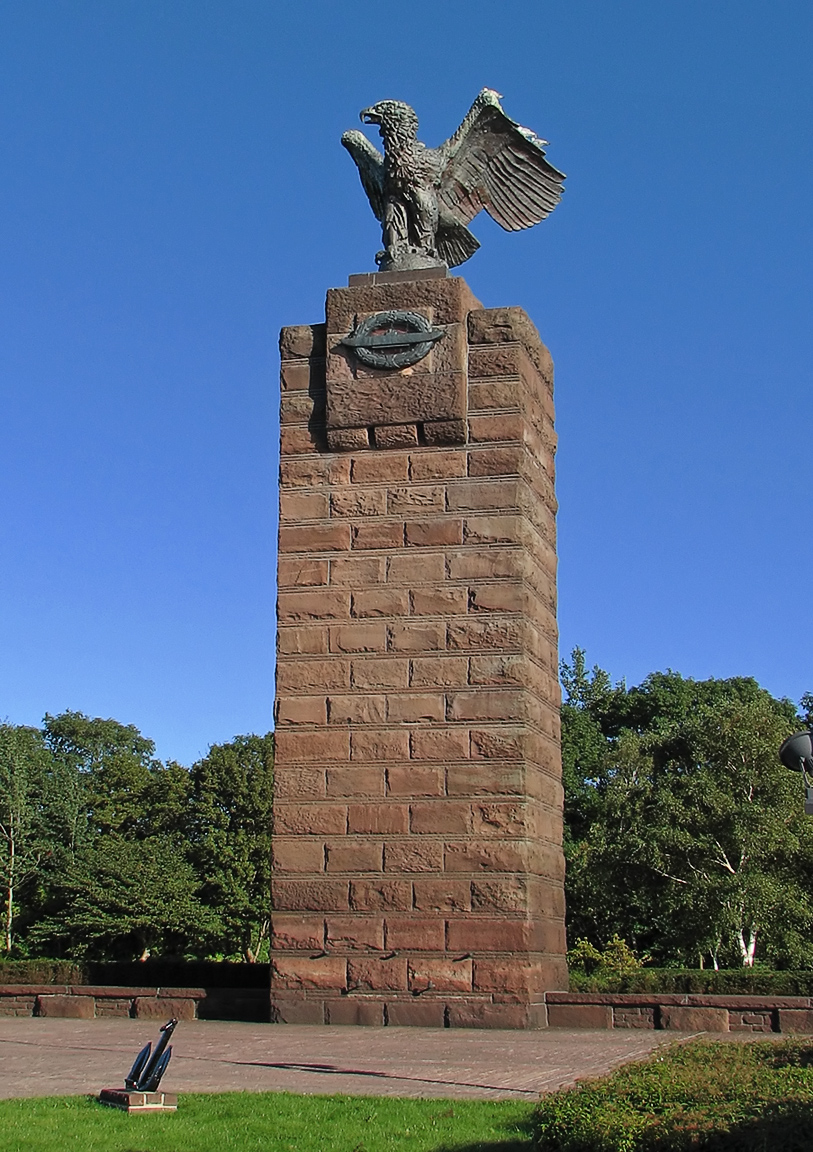
Möltenort U-Boat Memorial (U-Boot-Ehrenmal Möltenort)

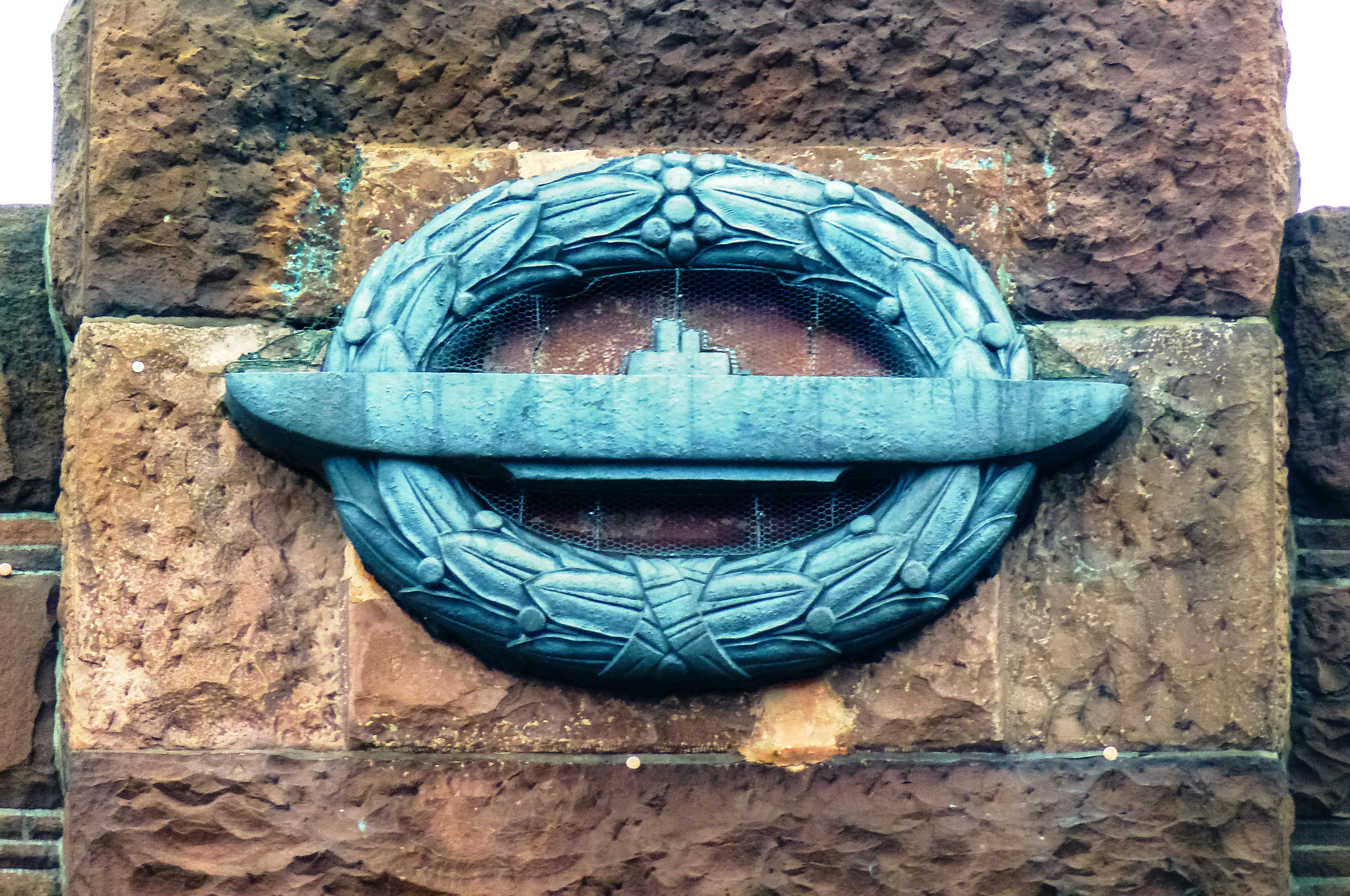
U-Boat war badge

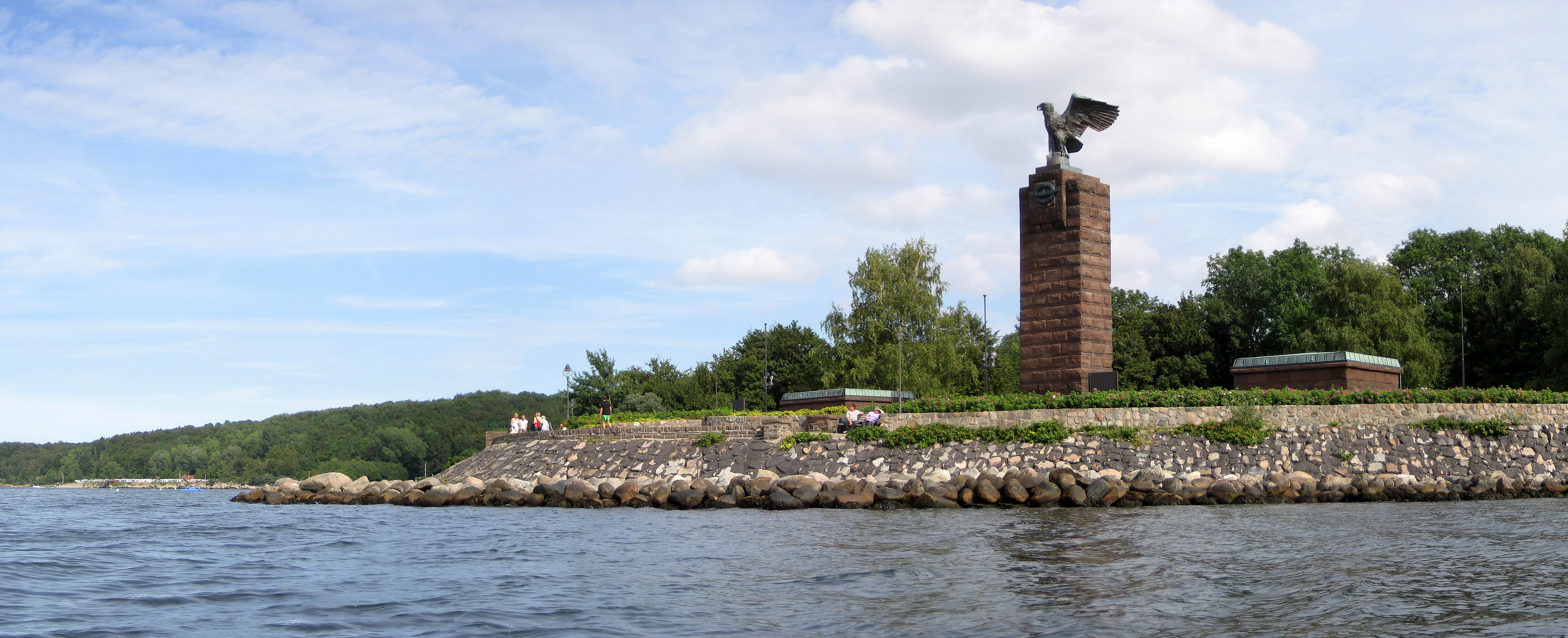
Memorial as seen from the water

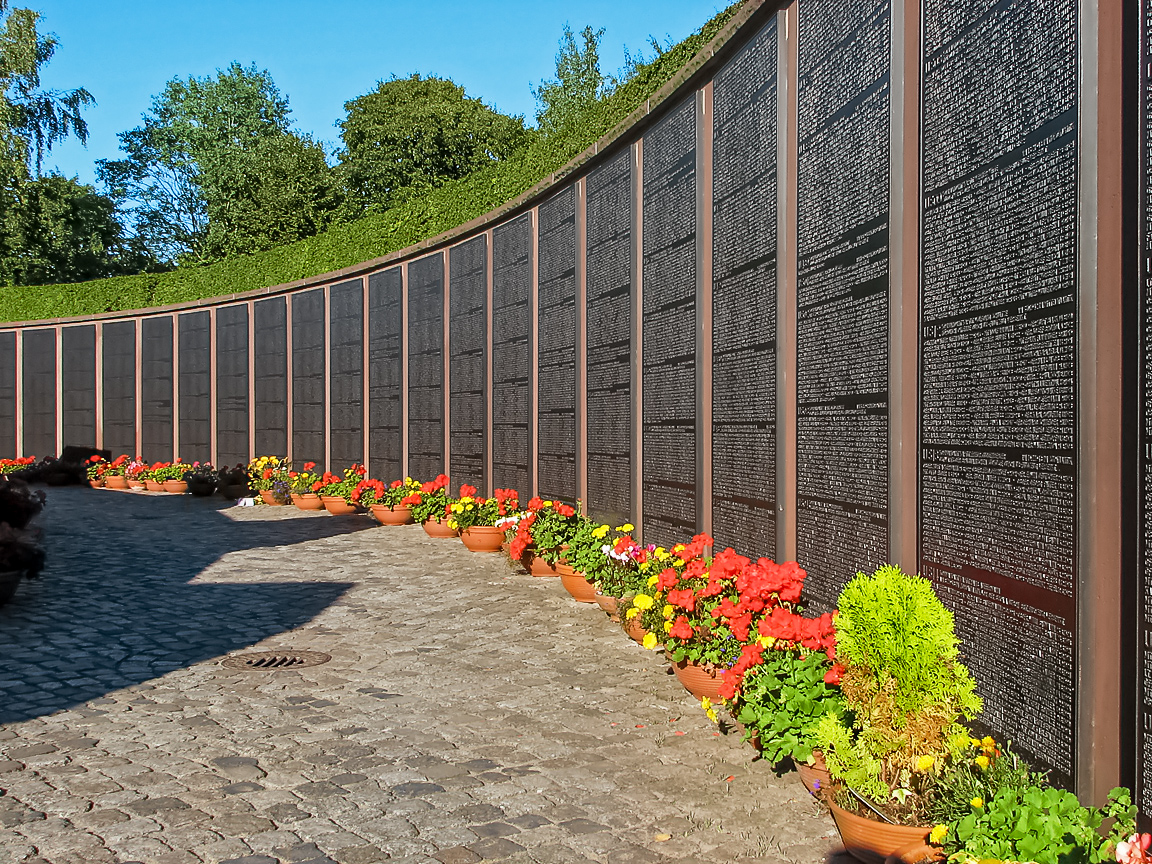
Commemorative plaques

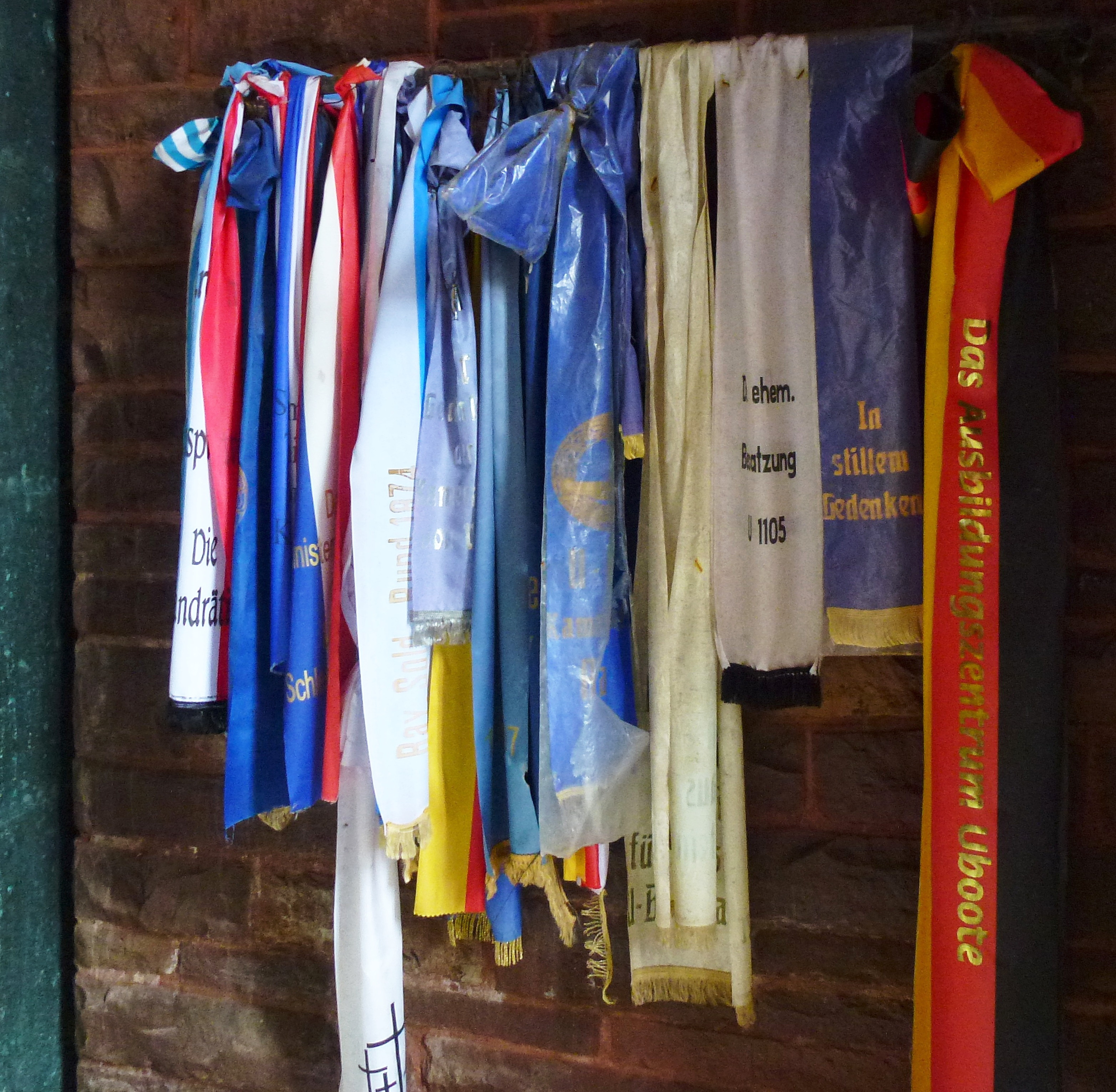
Mourning ribbons

The U-Boot-Ehrenmal Möltenort (Möltenort U-Boat Memorial) in Heikendorf near Kiel is a memorial site belonging to the German War Graves Commission, commemorating the sailors who died serving in U-Boat units during the First and Second World Wars, along with all victims of submarine warfare. The memorial also honours U-Boat sailors from the Bundeswehr who have been killed in service since. The memorial site is an emblem of Heikendorf.

== Monument ==
The monument was built on the former Möltenorter Schanze (Möltenort Fieldwork) in Heikendorf and dedicated on 8 June 1930. After suffering structural damage, it was rebuilt in 1938. It consists of a 15.3-metre-high pillar, at the top of which is a 4.8-metre-high eagle (designed by Fritz Schmoll). Extensive rust penetration was discovered in the internal steel supporting structure of the eagle in 2000, rendering renovation work necessary. Since 12 July 2001, the original eagle with its galvanised, copper-coated iron skin has been replaced by a recast bronze version similar to it (designed by the firm Noack from Berlin). The eagle was removed again in March 2012 for necessary reinforcement work after the detection of signs of fatigue in the supporting structure. The planned date of its return, initially scheduled to be six weeks later, was subjected to repeated delays thereafter; eventually, on 25 April 2013, the eagle was able to reassume its position.

The U-Boat war badge is attached to the pillar; until 1945 its position had been occupied by a swastika. This was made unrecognizable by the filling-in of the spaces between its arms, however it can still be made out behind the badge.

== Plaques ==
In an arched gallery area, the names of fallen German U-Boat men of the German Imperial Navy and the Kriegsmarine, along with those of soldiers who died serving in the German Navy, are displayed on 115 bronze plaques.

The number of fallen U-Boat men in the German Navy is stated on two plaques as follows:

1914–1918
4.744 Gefallene
200 verlorene U-Boote

(1914–1918
4,744 dead
200 U-Boats lost)

--------

1939–1945
30.002 Gefallene
739 verlorene U-Boote

(1939–1945
30,002 dead
739 U-Boats lost)

== See also ==
- Laboe Naval Memorial
