= Fritz Lau =

German writer (1872–1966)

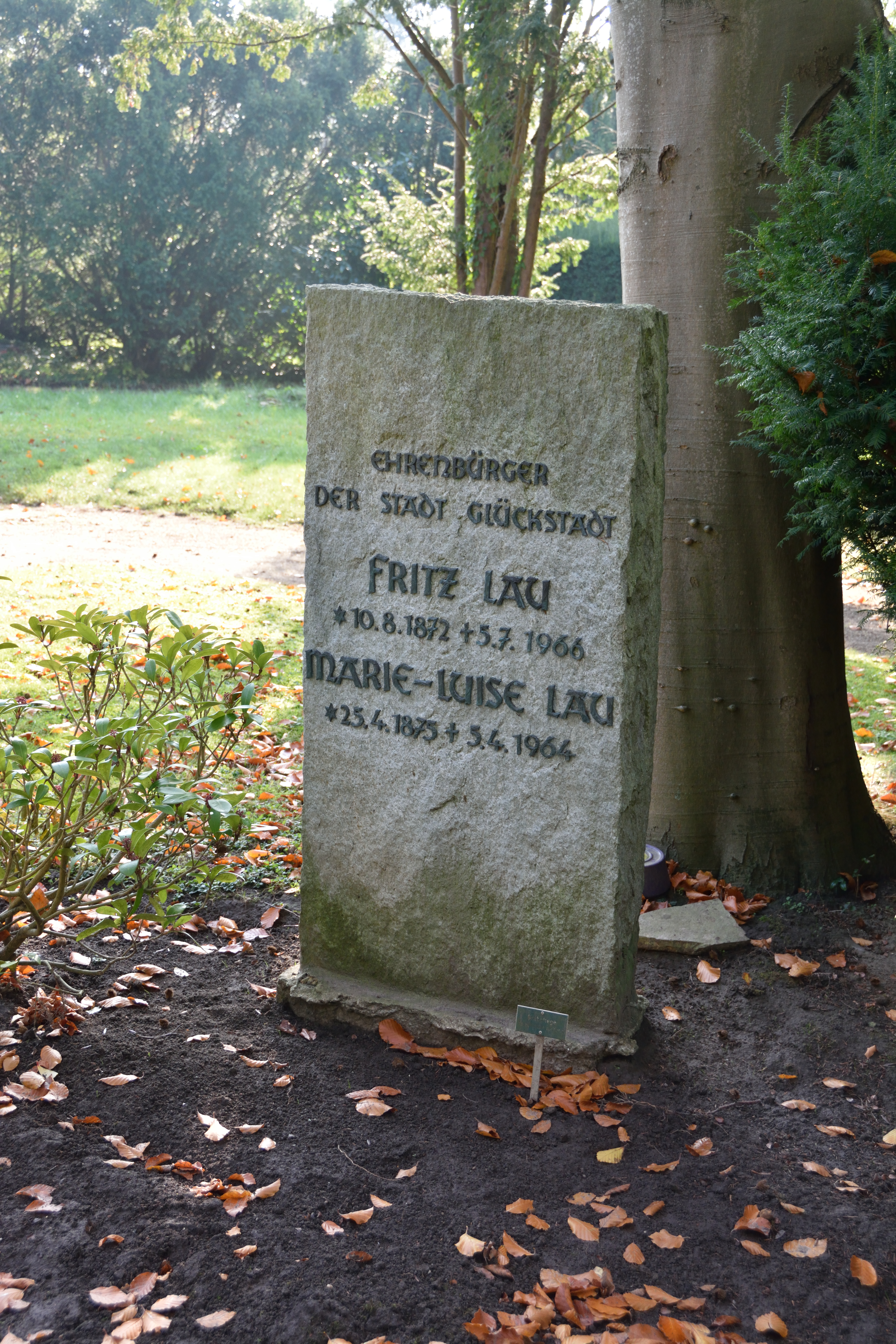
Gravestone of Fritz Lau in Glückstadt cemetery

Fritz Lau (1872–1966) was Low German writer, playwright and lyricist.

== Life ==
Fritz Lau was born on 10 August 1872 in the fishing village of Möltenort near the north German city port of Kiel. His father was a mariner and often away from home. According to Lau, his mother was a good storyteller, who also regaled Klaus Groth with her stories when he occasionally stopped by. Lau went to school in Altheikendorf and, at the age of 17, he entered the postal service where, after an initial job as an assistant in the Kiel area, he worked in many parts of Germany. He lived in Glückstadt from 1898 and retired in 1923. In his free time he was a writer in the Low German dialect. Publishing very little during the Nazi era, he released a final collection of stories in 1962: Wat löppt de Tiet. Utsöcht Vertellen. He died on 5 July 1966 in Glückstadt.

On 16 May 1955, the town of Glückstadt made him an honorary citizen. In his honour, his study was faithfully recreated in the Detlefsen Museum in Glückstadt.

== Distinctions and honours ==
- 1955 honorary citizen of Glückstadt
- In Glückstadt the square of Fritz-Lau-Platz is named after him.
- In Uetersen and Moorrege there are roads called Fritz-Lau-Weg; in Kiel (1966), Büdelsdorf, Heikendorf, Marne and Schenefeld there are roads called Fritz-Lau-Straße named after him.

== Works ==
- Johann un Trina up Reisen. Schwank in 1 Aufzug. H. Lühr & Dircks, Garding [1910].
- Brandung. Geschichten von de Waterkant. H. Lühr & Dircks, Garding 1913.
- Sein Wunsch. In: Die Heimat. December 1914. 24th Year. No. 12. Hamburg 1914, p. 313. digital copy
- Ost un West. H. Lühr & Dircks, Garding 1915.
- Helden to Hus. M. Glogau, Hamburg 1915.
- Sinen ersten Breef. In: Die Heimat. August 1915 25th Year. No. 8, Hamburg 1915. digital copy
- Fief Jahr Tuchthus. In: Hauskalender für den Kreis Plön 1915. Kaven, Plön 1915. digital copy
- In Luv un Lee. M. Glogau, Hamburg 1916.
- Sünn achter de Wolken. H. Lühr & Dircks, Garding 1918.
- Elsbe. Ein Stück Minschenleben. M. Glogau, Hamburg 1918.
- De Notflagg. In: Sonderabdruck aus der Wochenschrift Zeitspiegel, hrsg. von Johannes John, Flensburg. Nr. 15, vom 22. November 1919. digital copy
- Katenlüd. H. Lühr & Dircks, Garding 1920. (M. Glogau, Hamburg 1921)
- Kopp hoch. M. Glogau, Hamburg 1921.
- Drees Dreesen, Een Stück Minschenleben. M. Glogau, Hamburg 1924.
- So is dat Leben! M. Glogau, Hamburg 1926.
- Ünner 'n Tüffel. En vergnögt Spillwark in cen' Törn. Lühr & Dircks, Garding [1926].
- Ebb un Flot. Glück un Not. M. Glogau, Hamburg 1926.
- Kinneland. Plattdeutsche Erzählungen. Belz, Langensalza 1927.
- Lach mit! M. Glogau, Hamburg 1929.
- Wat mi so öwer'n Weg löp. M. Glogau, Hamburg 1932.
- Von em un ehr! M. Glogau, Hamburg 1932.
- Jungs un Deerns von de Waterkant. Kurze Geschichten. Otto Meißner, Hamburg 1933.
- Wie möt dor henlank. M. Glogau, Hamburg 1934.
- Wat mi so öwer'n Weg löp. M. Glogau, Hamburg 1949.
- Wat löppt de Tiet. Utsöcht Vertellen. Zum 90. Geburtstag von Fritz Lau. Fehrs-Gilde, Hamburg-Wellingsbüttel 1962.
- De besten Geschichten von Fritz Lau. 31 Geschichten aus 11 Bänden seines gesamten Werkes ausgesucht, ed. by Erich Könnecke. Glogau, Hamburg 1981.

== Literatur about Fritz Lau ==
- Lau, Fritz. In: Franz Brümmer: Lexikon der deutschen Dichter und Prosaisten vom Beginn des 19. Jahrhunderts bis zur Gegenwart. Vol. 4. 6th edn. Leipzig, 1913, p. 195. digital copy
- Geerd Spanker: Vom niederdeutschen Ernst und niederdeutscher Freude. (Zum 70. Geburtstag von Fritz Lau.). In: Die Heimat. 52.1942. Issue 3, July – September 1942.
- Lotte Foerste: Fritz Lau. In: Plattdeutsche Erzähler des 19. Jahrhunderts. Wachholtz, Neumünster 1977, pp. 221–225.
- Kai Dohnke: Bibliographie Fritz Lau. In: Steinburger Jahrbuch, 28th Year (1984), pp. 148–159
- Magdalene Iwersen: Fritz Lau – Postbeamter und Heimatdichter. In: Post- und Fernmeldegeschichte zwischen Nord- und Ostsee. Heft 1. Kiel 1987, S. 177–189.
- Susanne Fischer: Fritz Lau: Literarische Produktion und Selbstdeutung. In: Quickborn, 77th Year. (1987) No. 3, pp. 183–194.
- Stefanie Janssen: Auf den Spuren von Fritz Lau. Ed. Seestern, Mönkeberg 2006.
- Fritz Lau – Heimweh na Möltenort. In: Kieler Nachrichten dated 3 January 2012]
- Lau, Fritz. In: Killy Literaturlexikon. Autoren und Werke des deutschsprachigen Kulturraums, ed. by Wilhelm Kühlmann. Vol. 7. 2010. p. 254. digital copy
