= Junkers L1 =

1920s German aircraft piston engine

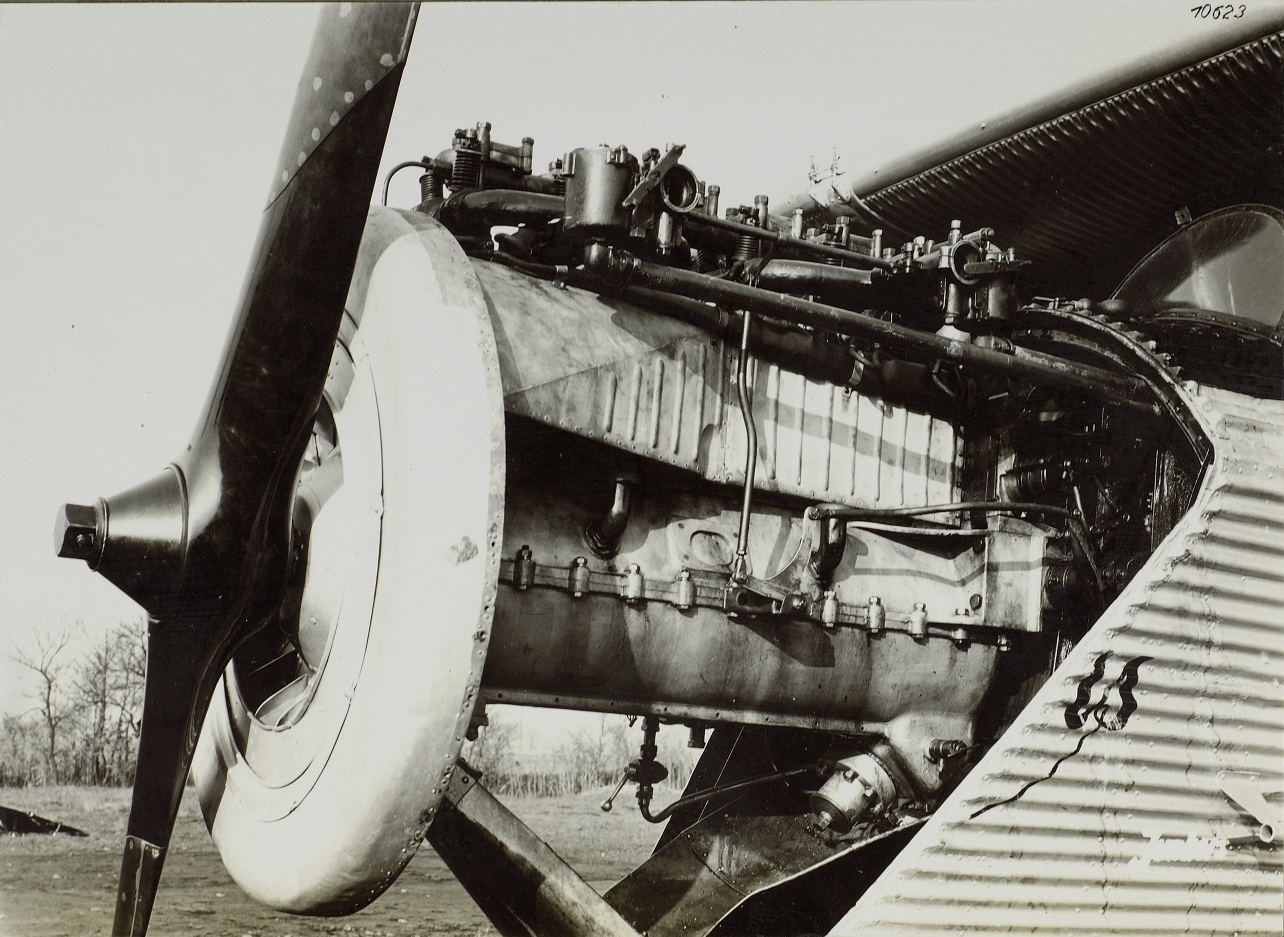
- The L1 engine used on the Junkers T 19
- Type: Four-stroke petrol six-cylinder air-cooled inline
- National origin: Germany
- Manufacturer: Junkers Motorenbau GmbH (Jumo)
- First run: 1921
- Manufactured: Small production run started in 1925

The Junkers L1 was the first engine manufactured by Junkers to fly. It was an air-cooled, upright six-cylinder inline four-stroke petrol engine only produced in small numbers and largely used for research, but led to the successful L5 and its V-12 development, the L55.

== Design and development ==
Hugo Junkers' early engineering experience was with stationary opposed-piston two-stroke diesel engines for industrial applications and this arrangement was eventually adapted for aircraft use. Nonetheless, his company's first aero engine was a petrol-fuelled four-stroke, the six-cylinder inline air-cooled L1. L was Junkers' notation for petrol engines from the L1 to the L10, which became the Jumo 210 in 1931. It first ran in 1921 and was the subject of much static testing, but the intention was always to produce a flight engine. The first aircraft to test fly the L1 was the Junkers T 19; this aircraft first flew in 1922, but the date of its first flight with the L1 is uncertain.

Notable features were the four large valves per cylinder, two inlet and two exhaust; the ball race main bearings; and the double ignition system, with twin magnetos and two sparking plugs per cylinder.

== Operational history ==
The L1 was largely an experimental engine, but a small production line was set up in 1925. Reliability was not high, however and only a few aircraft, themselves built only in small numbers, used the L1 and its variants. The large diameter, circular blower fitted to the L1a resulted in a flat fronted, circular cross section cowling, particularly noticeable on the Junkers T 19 and 26.

== Variants ==
- L1 Original version.
- L1a Larger bore diameter and a large circular blower, gear driven, mounted at the front of the engine to enhance high altitude power.
- L1b

== Applications ==
- Focke-Wulf A 16b
- Junkers T 19
- Junkers T 26
- Junkers J 29

== Specifications (L1a) ==
Data from Kay (2004) p. 263

=== General characteristics ===
- Type: 6-cylinder air-cooled upright 4-stroke
- Bore: 100 mm (3.9 in)
- Stroke: 120 mm (4.7 in)
- Displacement: 5.65 L (345 cu in)
- Length: 1.115 m (3 ft 7.9 in)
- Width: 700 mm (2 ft 4 in)
- Height: 790 mm (2 ft 7 in)
- Dry weight: 128 kg (282 lb)

=== Components ===
- Valvetrain: two large inlet and two large exhaust valves per cylinder, operated by overhead camshaft
- Fuel type: petrol
- Cooling system: air-cooled; finned cylinder heads
- Reduction gear: none:direct drive
- Ignition system: twin magnetos and two sparking plugs per cylinder

=== Performance ===
- Power output: cruise 75 hp (56 kW); take-off 85 hp (63 kW)
- Fuel consumption: 26 kg/h (44 lb/hr)
