= Junkers Ju 268 =

Type of aircraft

General information
- Type: Glide bomb
- National origin: Germany
- Manufacturer: Junkers

The Junkers Ju 268 was the un-manned bomber component of the Mistel V parasite bomber project designed in Germany during 1944.

== Development ==
The Mistel V was a composite bomber comprising a Heinkel He 162A-2 piloted component and a specially developed Arado E.377 glider bomb. Due to shortages at the Arado design offices, several other composites were studied as replacements for the Arado design, and in late 1944 Junkers proposed the Ju 268 as an alternate bomber component for the Mistel VI with the Arado Ar 234.

The Ju 268 was simply designed with a wooden structure and a re-usable, jettisonable dolly serving as the undercarriage with Walter booster rockets. It was intended to be armed with either a 2,000-kilogram (4,400 lb) hollow-charge warhead or an 1,800-kilogram (4,000 lb) SC1800 bomb without its tail fins, mounted in the aircraft's nose. An alternative payload for ground targets was a combination of a purpose-designed bomb with more explosive power in the nose and 500 kilograms (1,100 lb) of a liquid explosive located in the tail.

The Ju 268 never proceeded past the design stage.

== Bibliography ==
- Forsyth, Robert (2020) [2001]. Mistel: German Composite Aircraft and Operations (Revised ed.). Crecy Publishing. ISBN 978-1-91080-981-5.
- Forsyth, Robert & Creek, Eddie J. (2008). Heinkel He 162 Volksjager: From Drawing Board to Destruction: The Volksjäger. Classic Publications. ISBN 978-1-90653-700-5.
- Sharp, Dan (2020). Heinkel He 162. Secret Projects of the Luftwaffe Close Up. Vol. 1. Tempest Books. ISBN 978-1-911658-24-5.
