= Junkers T 19 =

T 19
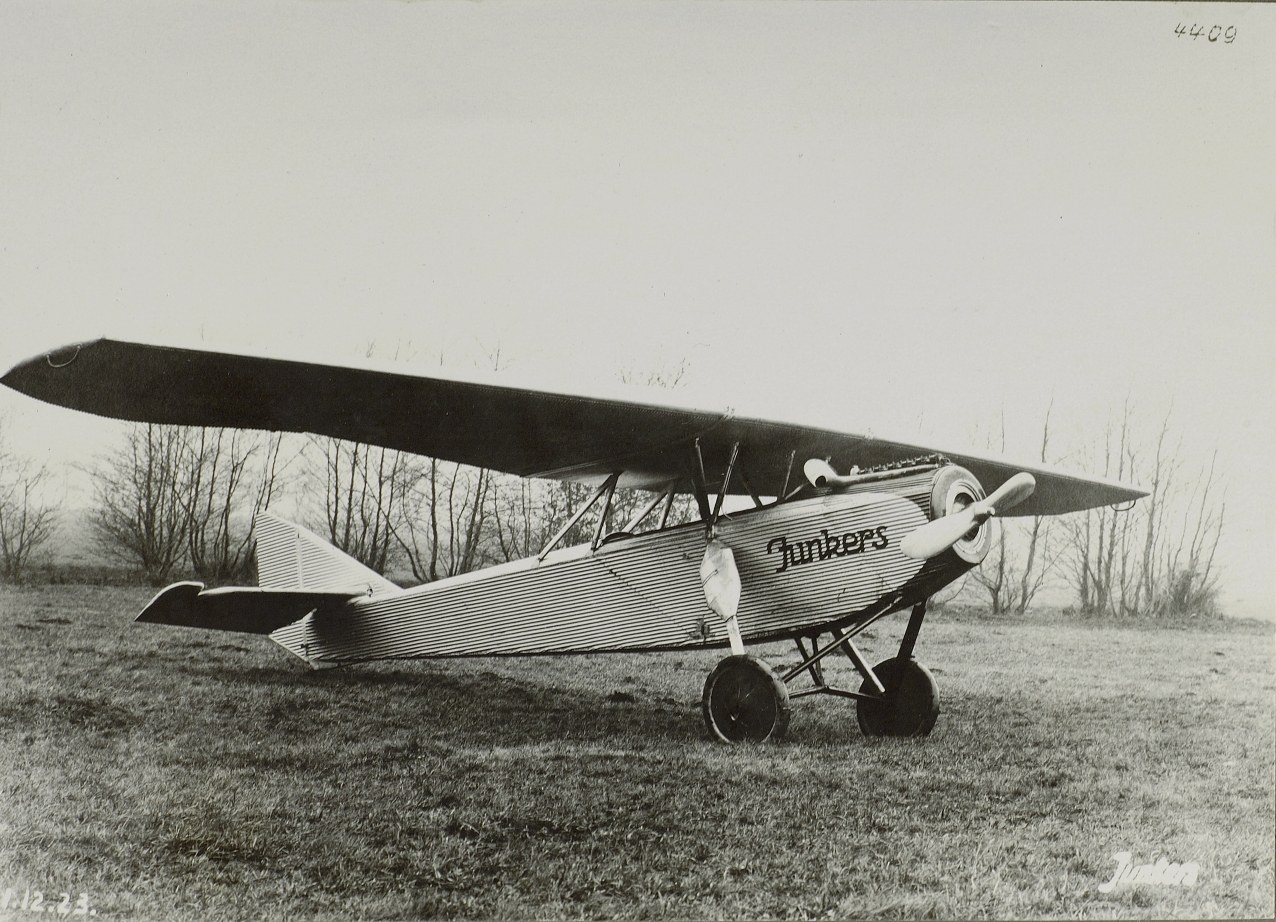
- T 19 circa 1922

General information
- Type: Training and touring
- National origin: Germany
- Manufacturer: Junkers Flugzeug Werke AG
- Number built: 3?

History
- First flight: 14 July 1922

The Junkers T 19, originally known as the J 19, was a single-engined parasol winged all-metal 2/3-seat aircraft built in Germany in the early 1920s for training and touring. Its construction was too expensive for commercial success and only three were built, one later finding use as an engine test-bed.

== Design and development ==
The Junkers T 19 was the first of three Junkers aircraft aimed at the private market; because of the high construction costs of all-metal light planes compared to their canvas covered contemporaries, none was successful. It was built mostly from duralumin with a tubular-membered frame covered by corrugated sheet.

The wing was a cantilever structure, without the lift struts to mid wing seen on most parasol winged aircraft. It had a constant chord centre section with outboard taper on both leading and trailing edges. The ailerons were short and wide chord, with curved trailing edges that projected beyond that of the wing. Four sets of V and inverted-V struts attached the wing to the upper fuselage longerons.

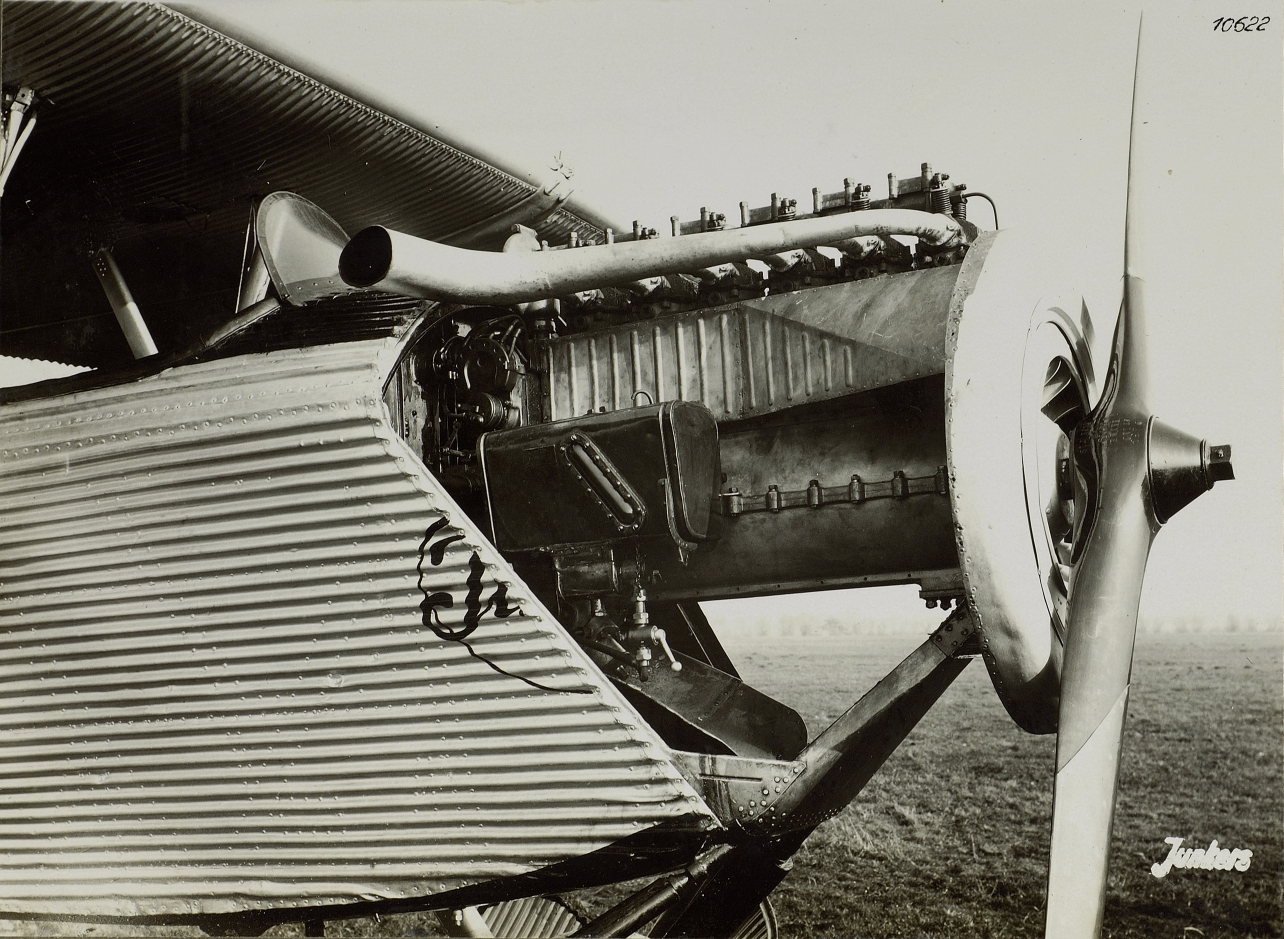
T 19 powered by the inline L1 engine

The tapered fuselage was flat sided, with a long open cockpit reaching from leading to trailing edge. The pilot sat at the front immediately behind the engine. Seats for one or two passengers could be fitted in the rear with access via a triangular shaped starboard side door. The tailplane was mounted on top of the fuselage and carried horn balanced elevators. The combination of a triangular fin and straight edged rudder, which extended down to the bottom of the fuselage in a cut out between the elevators, gave the vertical surface a rather pointed look. The main undercarriage legs, with prominent shock absorbers, were mounted on the upper fuselage longerons. Two bracing struts reached forward to the lower fuselage below the engine and the wheels were linked by a hinged axle centrally mounted to the lower fuselage with further struts.

== Operational history ==
The T 19 first flew on 14 July 1922, powered by a 55 hp (41 kW) Siemens-Halske Sh 4 5-cylinder radial engine. Two more T 19s were flown, one with a 77 hp (57 kW) 7-cylinder Sh 5 engine and the other with a 110 hp (82 kW) 9-cylinder Sh 12. The second T 19 was used as an engine test bed and was the first aircraft to fly with Junkers' first flight petrol engine, the air-cooled 75 hp (56 kW) 6-cylinder inline L1 of 1921. It also flew with a 1926 Armstrong Siddeley Genet. The third T 19 was sold to India.

== Specifications (Genet engine) ==
Data from Turner & Nowarra 1971 p.24

General characteristics

- Crew: 1
- Capacity: 1/2 passengers
- Length: 6.12 m (20 ft 1 in)
- Wingspan: 11.25 m (36 ft 11 in)
- Height: 2.77 m (9 ft 1 in)
- Wing area: 19.0 m^{2} (205 sq ft)
- Empty weight: 525 kg (1,158 lb)
- Gross weight: 761 kg (1,677 lb)
- Powerplant: 1 × Armstrong Siddeley Genet 5 cylinder radial, 60 kW (80 hp)

Performance

- Maximum speed: 134 km/h (83 mph, 72 kn)
- Cruise speed: 109 km/h (68 mph, 59 kn)
- Service ceiling: 4,000 m (13,000 ft)
