= Heikendorf =

- Municipality
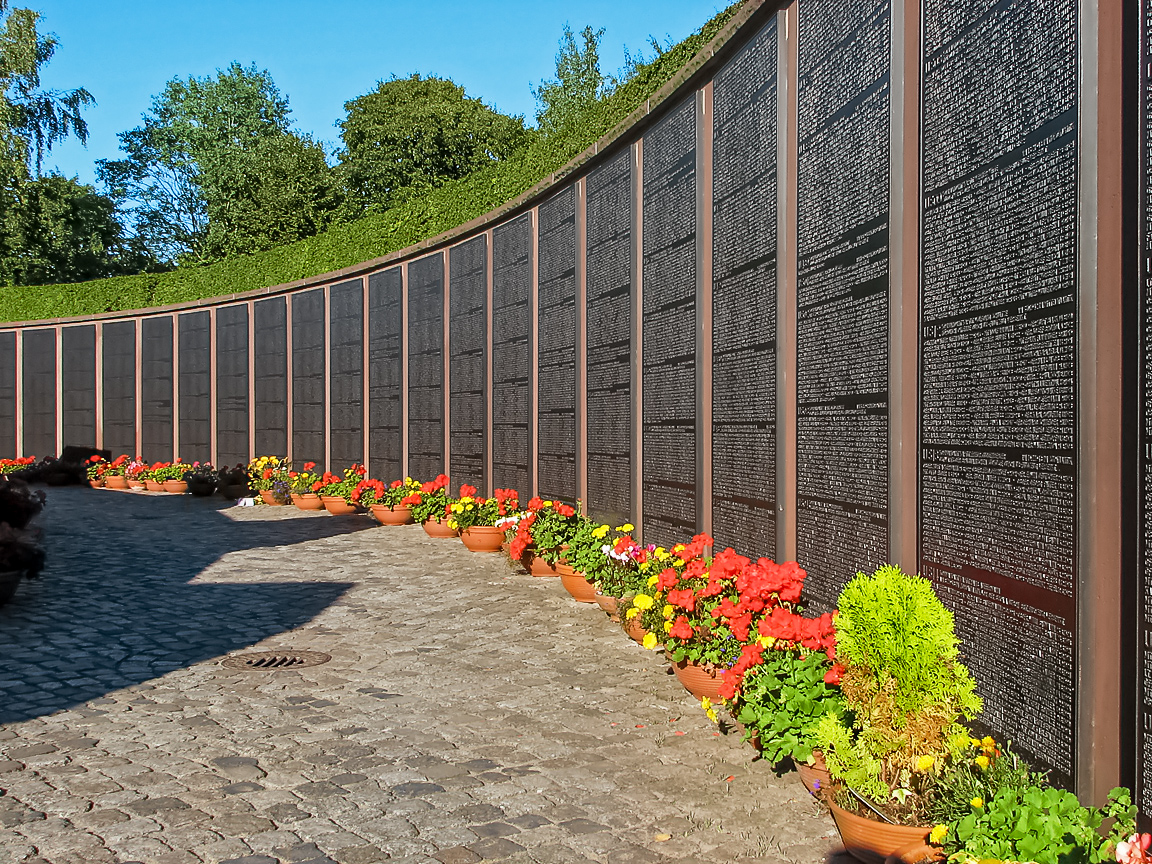
- Monument to fallen U-boat sailors

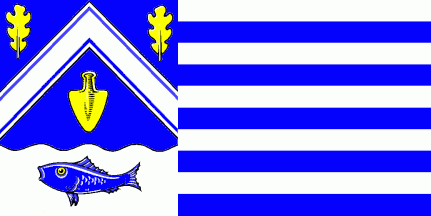
- Flag Coat of arms

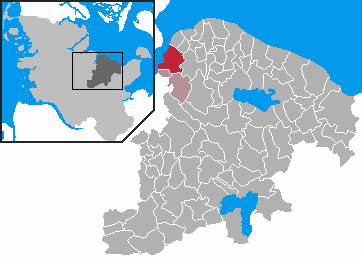
- Location of Heikendorf within Plön district
- Interactive map of Heikendorf
- Location within Germany Location within Schleswig-Holstein
- Coordinates: 54°22′20″N 10°12′29″E
- Country: Germany
- State: Schleswig-Holstein
- District: Plön
- Municipal assoc.: Schrevenborn

Government
  - Mayor: Tade Peetz (CDU)

Area
  - Total: 14.72 km^{2} (5.68 sq mi)
- Elevation: 19 m (62 ft)

Population (2025-12-31)
  - Total: 8,295
  - Density: 563.5/km^{2} (1,460/sq mi)
- Time zone: UTC+01:00 (CET)
  - Summer (DST): UTC+02:00 (CEST)
- Postal codes: 24226
- Dialling codes: 0431
- Vehicle registration: PLÖ
- Website: www.amt-schrevenborn.de

Heikendorf is a municipality in the district of Plön, in Schleswig-Holstein, Germany. It is a seaside resort off the Baltic Sea, located approximately 10 km from Kiel. The oldest part of the town is the Old Viking settlement in Möltenort.

== Notable people linked with Heikendorf ==
- Adolf Dethmann (1896–1979) engineer and communist activist
- Robert Habeck (born 2 September 1969 in Lübeck) writer and politician of Alliance '90/The Greens
- Freya Hoffmeister (born 1964), business owner and athlete who holds several sea kayaking endurance records
- Klaus-Dieter Flick (born 1937 in Germany) lawyer and financial broker, known as convicted Nazi art and military equipment collector from Kitzeberg, a wealthy suburb of Heikendorf
- Fritz Lau (1872–1966), Low German playwright and author
