= Junkers J 29 =

J 29

General information
- Type: Training and sports aircraft
- National origin: Germany
- Manufacturer: Junkers Flugzeug Werke AG
- Designer: Ernst Zindl
- Number built: 2

History
- First flight: 22 April 1925

The Junkers J 29 was a two-seat, single-engined experimental training monoplane, built in Germany in 1925. Its significance is that it was the first aircraft to fly and test the Junkers Doppelflügel (double wing) control surfaces used very successfully on the later Junkers Ju 52.

== Design and development ==
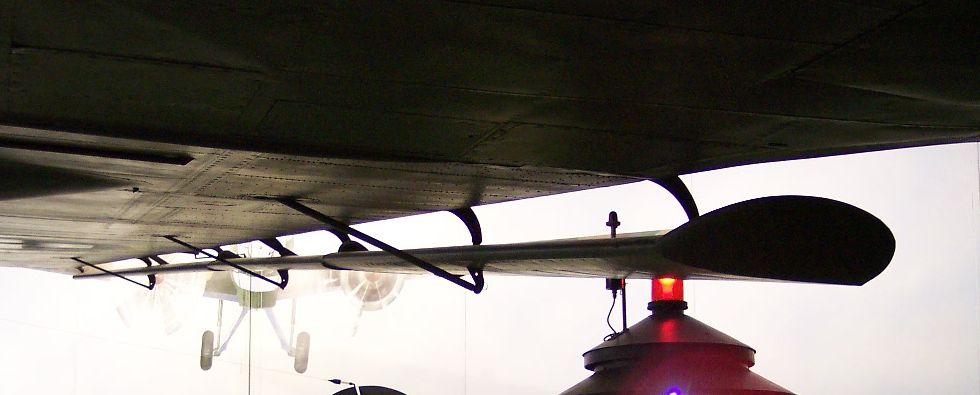
The Doppelflügel wing control surface hinging of a later Junkers Ju 86

.

The Junkers J 29 was a small, aerodynamically clean low wing cantilever monoplane, constructed with Junkers' standard method of duralumin tube frames skinned with corrugated sheets of the same alloy. The wing of the J 29 was straight tapered, almost entirely on the trailing edge and had nearly square tips. The J 29 pioneered the patented Junkers Doppelflügel "double wing" control system - whose concept was used through to the Third Reich's Junkers Ju 87 Stuka dive bomber - using full span ailerons, later used for both ailerons and flaps, hinged just below the wing trailing edge and fully exposing the entire control surface cross-section to the slipstream, forming a slot between the two surfaces. In normal flight these were used as standard ailerons, but they could be lowered like flaps for landing whilst retaining the differential movement needed for lateral control.

The fuselage was flat sided with rounded decking, the Junkers L1a inline engine cowled with its cylinder heads slightly exposed. Pilot and passenger sat side by side over the wing in a cockpit open apart from a longitudinal arch over their heads to protect them like a roll bar, set perpendicularly to the similar cross-fuselage device only used directly behind the cockpit on the Junkers J 2, the Junkers J 7 experimental duralumin-structure monoplane and production Junkers D.I fighter of the late World War I years. This unusual feature reminded observers of a handle and earned the J 29 the nickname Bügeleisen (en: flat iron). The fuselage tapered to the parallel chord tailplane braced on top of it. The fin was blunt and the rudder wide chord and deep, moving within a cut out in the elevators. Neither rudder nor elevators were horn balanced. The fixed undercarriage had a standard Junkers layout, with short splayed main legs fitted with noticeable shock absorbers mounted to the forward wing root and braced forwards to points under the engine. The wheels were linked by a centrally hinged cross axle, mounted on a V strut below the fuselage.

The first of two J 29s flew in April 1925. Though they had a Junkers sales description as the T 29, suggesting a training role and a hope of sales, they seem to have been built primarily to flight test the double wing which was successfully used on later Junkers aircraft such as the G 28, the Ju 52/3m and the Ju 87.

== Specifications ==
Data from Kay 2004 p.54-6

General characteristics

- Crew: 1
- Capacity: 1 passenger
- Length: 7.15 m (23 ft 5 in)
- Wingspan: 11.5 m (37 ft 9 in)
- Height: 2.26 m (7 ft 5 in)
- Wing area: 17.7 m^{2} (191 sq ft)
- Empty weight: 490 kg (1,080 lb)
- Gross weight: 750 kg (1,653 lb)
- Powerplant: 1 × Junkers L1a 6-cylinder upright air-cooled inline, 62 kW (83 hp)

Performance

- Maximum speed: 140 km/h (87 mph, 76 kn)
- Cruise speed: 109 km/h (68 mph, 59 kn)
- Range: 470 km (290 mi, 250 nmi)
- Service ceiling: 2,500 m (8,200 ft)
