= Adolf Dethmann =

German engineer, social scientist and communist activist

Adolf Dethmann (born 3 December 1896, Neumünster; died 6 August 1979, Hamburg) was a German engineer, social scientist and communist activist and industrial manager.

== Biography ==
Adolf Dethmann was a son of Hans Peter Adolf Dethmann (born 20 February 1865 in Meldorf) and his wife Katharina Henriette (Henny), (born Boysen on 8 December 1870 in Flensburg; died 1 October 1952 in Heikendorf). Dethmann was active in the Communist Party of Germany (KPD), editing the journal Spartakus - the KPD journal for Schleswig-Holstein in March 1919. However he was thrown out of the party following the Heidelberg conference in October 1919, and became a founder member of the Communist Workers' Party of Germany (KAPD) when that was founded in April 1920.

Dethmann had become friends with Hugo Junkers and in 1931 was appointed managing director of his company.

After the Nazi seizure of power in 1933, Dethmann was released from the Junkers works and arrested for "treason". Although he was acquitted, German Chancellor Hermann Göring ordered that Dethmann should no longer work in any of the Junkerswerke plants and should no longer be resident in Dessau. Dethmann therefore moved to Hamburg in 1933 and worked here in a scientific antiquarian bookshop.

After Dethmann was bombed out in Hamburg during World War II, he moved back to Plön (district) in Schleswig-Holstein, Northern Germany. Shortly after the end of the war (1945) he became one of the founders of the KPD. In 1946 he was elected member of the district council and deputy district administrator. In the same year he was given a full-time job as a department head of the Economic Authority at the city of Kiel. In 1948 he went to Hamburg again and rebuilt his antiquarian bookshop. In 1957 he became employed at the Hamburg Economic Authority.
