= Junkers L88 =

German twelve cylinder engine

L88
- Type: 4-stroke petrol V-12 watercooled aircraft engine
- National origin: Germany
- Manufacturer: Junkers Motorenbau GmbH (Jumo)
- First run: 1930-1931
- Developed from: Junkers L8

The Junkers L88 was Junkers' first geared V12 engine, appearing c. 1930 and based on a pair of 6-cylinder L8s. In 1932 a supercharger was added. It was used in the world's second working pressurised aircraft, the Junkers Ju 49 and, for a while, in the large G 38 airliner and its Japanese built military version.

== Design and development ==
In 1929 Junkers developed their successful Junkers L5 6-cylinder inline 4-stroke aircraft engine into the L8 by increasing its rotational speed and gearing down the output shaft. Just as the L55 V12 was made by combining two L5s, the L88 combined two L8s into a 60° V12. This had the same bore, stroke, camshaft operated twin pairs of valves per cylinder, water-cooling etc. as the L5, like the L55 driving a common crankshaft in a revised crankcase. An exhaust driven supercharger was added after a year to maintain power at high altitude and this version was named the L88a.

== Operational history ==
Only a few L88 and L88a engines were built. The Ju 49 high altitude research aircraft initially (1932) flew with the L88 and later (1934) with the supercharged L88a. The two G38s used a variety of engines including both the L88 and the L88a. The heavy bomber variant of the G 38, built in Japan as the Mitsubishi Ki-20 was initially powered by L88as. These were replaced, as on the G 38s, by Jumo 204 diesel engines.

== Applications ==
- Junkers G 38, both L 88 and L 88a
- Junkers Ju 49, both L 88 and L 88a
- Mitsubishi Ki-20, L88a

== Specifications ==
Data from Kay (2004) pp.266

=== General characteristics ===
- Type: upright V12 water-cooled 4-stroke piston engine
- Bore: 160 mm (6.30 in)
- Stroke: 190 mm (7.48 in)
- Displacement: 45.8 L (2,795 cu in)
- Dry weight: 510 kg (1,125 lb)

=== Components ===
- Valvetrain: two inlet and two exhaust valves per cylinder, one overhead camshaft on each bank
- Supercharger: exhaust gas driven
- Fuel type: petrol
- Oil system: forced
- Cooling system: water-cooled
- Reduction gear: choice between 2.47:1 to 1.44:1

=== Performance ===
- Power output: cruise 675 hp (503 kW) at 1,870 rpm, take-off 788 hp (587 kW)

== See also ==
Related lists

- List of aircraft engines

== Bibliography ==
- Gunston, Bill (2006). World Encyclopedia of Aero Engines: From the Pioneers to the Present Day (5th ed.). Stroud, UK: Sutton. ISBN 0-7509-4479-X.
- Kay, Antony (2004). Junkers Aircraft & Engines 1913–1945. London: Putnam Aeronautical Books. ISBN 0-85177-985-9.
