= Junkers L55 =

German twelve cylinder engine

L55
- Junkers L55 on display at the Polish Aviation Museum
- Type: V12 aircraft engine
- National origin: Germany
- Manufacturer: Junkers Motorenbau GmbH (Jumo)
- First run: 1927
- Developed from: Junkers L5

The Junkers L55 was Junkers' first V12 engine, appearing in 1927 and based on a pair of six-cylinder L5s. In 1928 a supercharger was added. It was used in one or two Junkers aircraft in their early development but was replaced by the geared L88 geared V12 of 1929.

== Design and development ==
The most widely used of Junkers' series of six-cylinder inline four-stroke aircraft engines was the L5, first run in 1922. This engine was used in 1927 as the basis of the 665 hp L55, which had two banks of six cylinders aligned at 60°. These banks had the same bore, stroke, camshaft operated twin pairs of valves per cylinder, water-cooling etc. as the L5, driving new a common crankshaft in a revised crankcase. A supercharger was added after a year to improve high altitude power.

== Operational history ==
The L55 is only known to have powered two aircraft for certain, the Junkers G 38 early in its career and the Junkers A 32. The first G 38 originally had two L55s inboard plus two L8 engines. The high altitude research Junkers Ju 49 may have used the L55 at the start of its flight programme. The L55 was rapidly replaced by the L88 in both the G 38 and Ju 49.

== Applications ==
- Junkers A 32
- Junkers G 38
- Junkers Ju 49, possibly

== Specifications ==
Data from Kay (2004) pp.265-6

=== General characteristics ===
- Type: upright V-12 water-cooled 4-stroke piston engine
- Bore: 160 mm (6.3 in)
- Stroke: 190 mm (7.5 in)
- Displacement: 45.84 L (2,797 cu in)
- Length: 2.287 m (7 ft 6.0 in)
- Width: 1.273 m (4 ft 2.1 in)
- Height: 0.84 m (2 ft 9 in)
- Dry weight: 585 kg (1,290 lb)

=== Components ===
- Valvetrain: two inlet and two exhaust valves per cylinder, one overhead camshaft on each bank
- Supercharger: added to rear of engine in 1928
- Fuel type: petrol
- Oil system: forced
- Cooling system: water-cooled
- Reduction gear: none; direct drive

=== Performance ===
- Power output: cruise 665 hp (496 kW) at 1,700 rpm, take-off 690 hp (510 kW)
- Fuel consumption: 150 kg/h (331 lb/hr)

== See also ==
Related lists

- List of aircraft engines

== Bibliography ==
- Gunston, Bill (2006). World Encyclopedia of Aero Engines: From the Pioneers to the Present Day (5th ed.). Stroud, UK: Sutton. ISBN 0-7509-4479-X.
- Kay, Antony (2004). Junkers Aircraft & Engines 1913–1945. London: Putnam Aeronautical Books. ISBN 0-85177-985-9.
