= Junkers L2 =

German six cylinder engine

L2
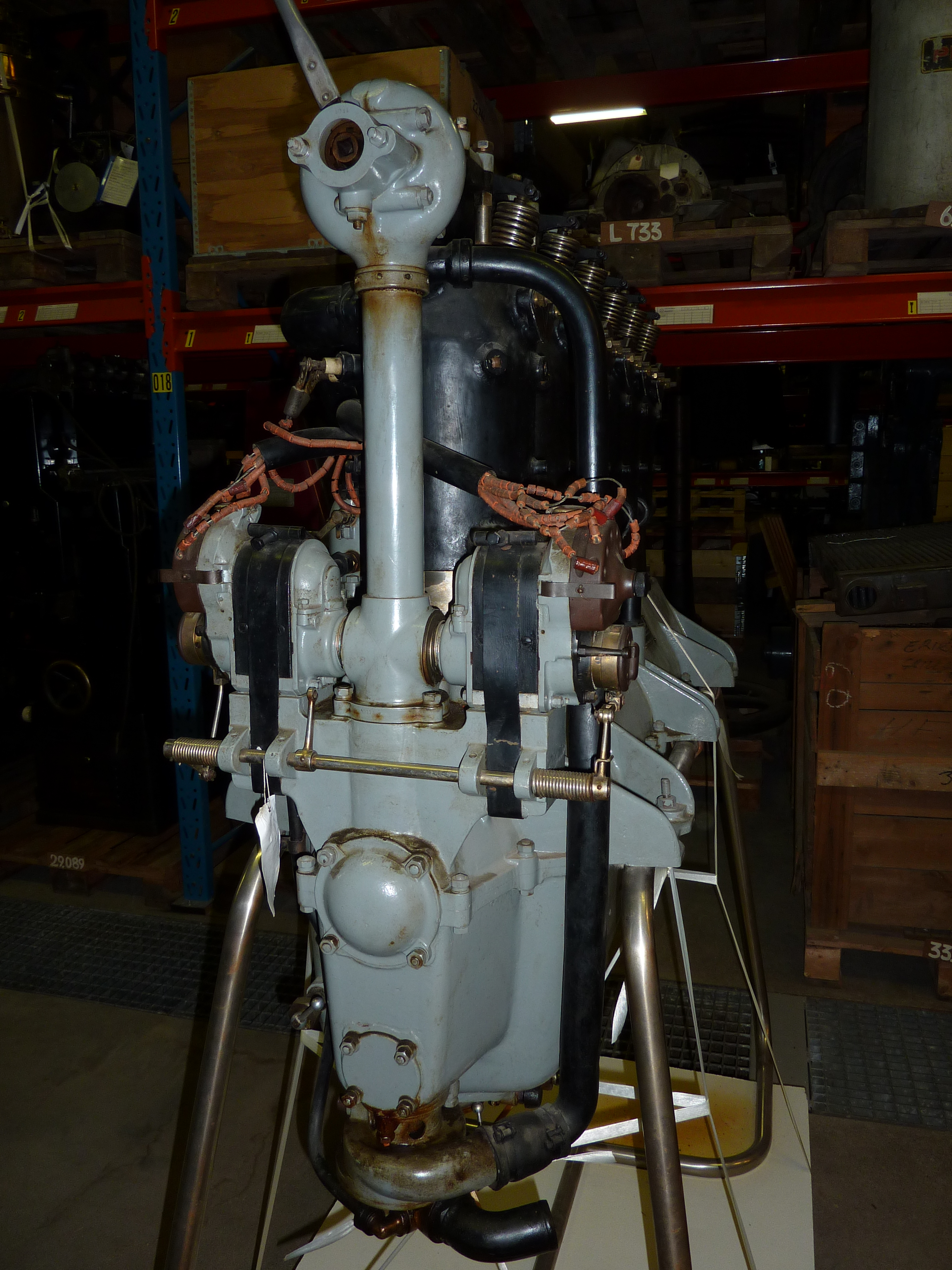
- Type: 4-stroke petrol 6-cylinder water-cooled inline aircraft engine
- National origin: Germany
- Manufacturer: Junkers Motorenbau GmbH (Jumo)
- First run: 1925
- Number built: 58

The Junkers L2 was Junkers' first water-cooled four-stroke engine and the first to be built on a production line, though only 58 were made. It was a six-cylinder inline engine and powered many Junkers aircraft until replaced by the more powerful L5.

== Design and development ==
The Junkers L2 (the L signifying a four-stroke petrol engine rather than a two-stroke diesel) had some features in common with their first petrol engine, the L1, both six-cylinder upright direct drive inline engines with four overhead camshaft driven valves per cylinder, but was water-cooled rather than air-cooled and had a much greater swept volume. It initially developed a cruise power of 195 horsepower (hp) (145 kW) at 1,550 rpm but was developed to 220 hp (164 kW).

== Operational history ==
The L2 powered early versions of several Junkers aircraft. It was soon replaced in these models by the more powerful Junkers L5 and only 58 L2s were built.

== Variants ==
- L2 initial version.
- L2a refined L2, 230 hp.

== Applications ==
Early versions of

- Junkers F 13
- Junkers A 20
- Junkers G 23
- Junkers G 24
- Junkers W 33

Re-engined

- Junkers Ju 21

== Specifications (L2) ==
Data from Kay (2004), pp. 263–264

=== General characteristics ===
- Type: 6-cylinder upright water-cooled inline 4-stroke piston engine
- Bore: 150 mm (5.906 in)
- Stroke: 180 mm (7.09 in)
- Displacement: 19.1 L (1,166 cu in)
- Length: 1.58 m (5 ft 2¾ in)
- Width: 0.555 m (1 ft 9¾ in)
- Height: 1.085 m (3ft 6¾ in)
- Dry weight: 310 kg (684 lb)

=== Components ===
- Valvetrain: Two inlet and two exhaust valves per cylinder, overhead camshaft operated
- Fuel system: Twin carburettors
- Fuel type: Petrol
- Oil system: Combined splash and pressure
- Cooling system: Water-cooled
- Reduction gear: Direct drive

=== Performance ===
- Power output: cruise 195 hp (145 kW) at 1,550 rpm, take-off 230 hp (171 kW)
- Fuel consumption: 31.82 kg/h (70.16 lb/hr)

== See also ==
Related lists

- List of aircraft engines

== Bibliography ==
- Gunston, Bill (2006). World Encyclopedia of Aero Engines: From the Pioneers to the Present Day (5th ed.). Stroud, UK: Sutton. ISBN 0-7509-4479-X.
- Kay, Antony (2004). Junkers Aircraft & Engines 1913–1945. London: Putnam Aeronautical Books. ISBN 0-85177-985-9.
