= Junkers T.21 =

1923 German reconnaissance aircraft

T 21

General information
- Type: Reconnaissance aircraft
- National origin: Germany
- Manufacturer: Junkers
- Designer: Ernst Zindel
- Primary user: Soviet Air Force
- Number built: 120

History
- First flight: 12 June 1923

The Junkers J 21 (manufacturer's sales designations T 21 and H 21) was a reconnaissance aircraft designed in Germany in the early 1920s and produced in the Soviet Union at the Junkers plant at Fili for use by the Soviet Air Force.

== Design and development ==
The J 21 was an all-metal, parasol-wing monoplane of conventional configuration and fixed, tailskid undercarriage. The pilot and observer sat in tandem, open cockpits. Two prototypes were constructed at the Junkers factory in Dessau, the second with a wing of reduced area. Despite the fact that the prototypes were unable to attain the performance that had been specified by the Soviets, series production commenced at Fili in August 1923 where it was known as the Ju 21 (Юнкерс Ю 21 in Cyrillic).

The production version differed from the prototypes in having a BMW IV engine in place of the BMW III originally fitted, and carried machine gun armament for both the pilot and observer. Sluggish performance led to a few examples being fitted with L2 and L5 engines, but these provided little improvement. With performance only marginally better than the World War I-vintage de Havilland DH-9A that it had been purchased to replace, the Ju 21 was itself soon replaced by newly built DH-9As built under license as the Polikarpov R-1.

The type was also evaluated by the Reichswehr's clandestine training school at Lipetsk, but it was rejected due to its poor performance and the Heinkel HD 17 purchased instead.

== Variants ==
- J 22 (T 22): single-seat fighter version, very similar to the J 21 but with its wing lowered almost to the top of the fuselage to reduce drag, the pilot's cockpit moved back further than the gunner's position on the J 21 and a more rounded rudder. First of two flew 30 November 1923. No production so no sales or Russian letter prefix.
- J 28: two-seat fighter version of J 21 with a 400 hp BMW VI engine. No production.

== Operators ==
Iran

- Imperial Iranian Air Force: : Only 1 received in July of 1924.

Soviet Union

- Soviet Air Force

== Specifications (first prototype) ==
Data from Kay 2004 p.45

General characteristics

- Crew: Two, pilot and observer
- Length: 7.90 m (25 ft 11 in)
- Wingspan: 10.70 m (35 ft 1 in)
- Wing area: 21.8 m^{2} (235 sq ft)
- Empty weight: 830 kg (1,830 lb)
- Gross weight: 1,225 kg (2,700 lb)
- Powerplant: 1 × BMW IIIa , 138 kW (185 hp)

Performance

- Maximum speed: 217 km/h (135 mph, 117 kn)
- Range: 750 km (470 mi, 410 nmi)
