= Albatros L 83 Adler =

L 83 Adler
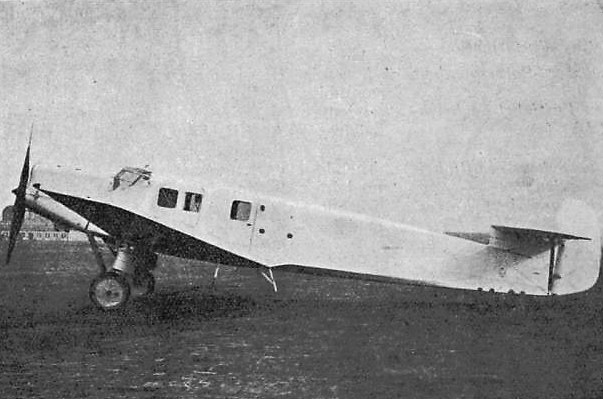

General information
- Type: 5-seat transport aircraft
- National origin: Germany
- Manufacturer: Albatros Flugzeugwerke
- Number built: 2

History
- First flight: 1931

The Albatros L 83 Adler was a small, fast transport aircraft for passengers, mail or other cargo, flown in Germany in 1931. Two were built.

== Design and development ==
The Adler (Eagle) was designed to be a fast, light transport aircraft, carrying payloads of 600–765 kg (1,323–1,687 lb) over distances of around 750 km (470 mi; 7.5×10^{14} nm). It had thick section, low-set, high aspect ratio (10.8) wings and was powered by a 210 kW (280 hp) Junkers L5 six-cylinder liquid-cooled inline engine.

The wing was in three parts, with a very short, rectangular plan centre-section built into the fuselage structure and containing the fuel tanks. Its ends were braced on each side with pairs of streamlined steel struts to the upper fuselage. Long-span cantilever outer panels were strongly straight-tapered in plan and also tapered in thickness from below, giving the Adler 4° of dihedral. The wings were built around pairs of trellis type spars and covered with corrugated duralumin. High aspect ratio ailerons filled the outer halves of the trailing edges.

The fuselage of the fuselage was based on a cross-braced, rectangular section steel frame. Its Junkers L5 engine was mounted in the nose and neatly cowled, with its oil tank aft of a firewall and a retractable honeycomb radiator on the fuselage underside. The region behind the engine contained an enclosed cockpit over the leading edge and a cabin which extended back to the trailing edge; the sides of this part of the fuselage were dural covered and its slightly shaped upper and lower surfaces canvas covered. The rear fuselage was entirely canvas covered. The cockpit contained two side-by-side seats provided with dual controls and was accessed via the cabin. This was a space 2.35 m (93 in) long, 1.30 m (51 in) wide and 1.50 m (59 in) high, which could seat four, each with their own window, or be used to carry freight or mail. Aft of the cabin there was a small entry lobby with a port-side door and a facing, enclosed, toilet.

The Adler did not have a conventional fin but the in-flight adjustable tailplane was mounted above the fuselage on a small, thin aerofoil-section step with its rear underside cut-away, and braced from below with a single strut on each side. The one-piece elevator was aerodynamically balanced. The rudder, also balanced, was hinged from the rear fuselage and the rear of the step.

Its tailskid landing gear was fixed, with each mainwheel on its own bent axle from the central fuselage underside and with drag struts back to the lower fuselage frames. Short, near vertical, rubber shock absorber legs stood between the wheels and the forward spar at the extreme edge of the wing centre section. The tailskid was a steel tube with a wooden shoe.

== Operational history ==
The exact date of the first flight of the Albatros L.83 Adler is unknown but was in the first half of 1931. Two were built. The history of the first (D-2024) is not known but the second (D-2211) was registered to the Deutsche Verkehrsfliegerschule (DVS) transport flying school in February 1932.

== Operators ==
Germany

- DVS

== Specifications ==
Data from Les Ailes July 1931 Performance figures at 2,600 kg weight

General characteristics

- Crew: one
- Capacity: four passengers
- Length: 13.22 m (43 ft 4 in)
- Wingspan: 25 m (82 ft 0 in)
- Height: 3.34 m (10 ft 11 in)
- Wing area: 58 m^{2} (620 sq ft)
- Aspect ratio: 10.8
- Empty weight: 1,565 kg (3,450 lb)
- Gross weight: 2,600 kg (5,732 lb)
- Fuel capacity: 400 L (88 imp gal; 110 US gal)
- Powerplant: 1 × Junkers L5 6-cylinder liquid-cooled inline, 210 kW (280 hp)
- Propellers: 2-bladed

Performance

- Maximum speed: 190 km/h (120 mph, 100 kn) at 1,500 rpm
- Cruise speed: 165 km/h (103 mph, 89 kn) at 1,340 rpm
- Range: 750 km (470 mi, 400 nmi)
- Service ceiling: 5,100 m (16,700 ft)
- Rate of climb: 2.2 m/s (430 ft/min)
- Minimum speed: 82 km/h (51 mph; 44 kn)
