= Junkers G 24 =

1920s and 1930s German passenger aircraft

G 24
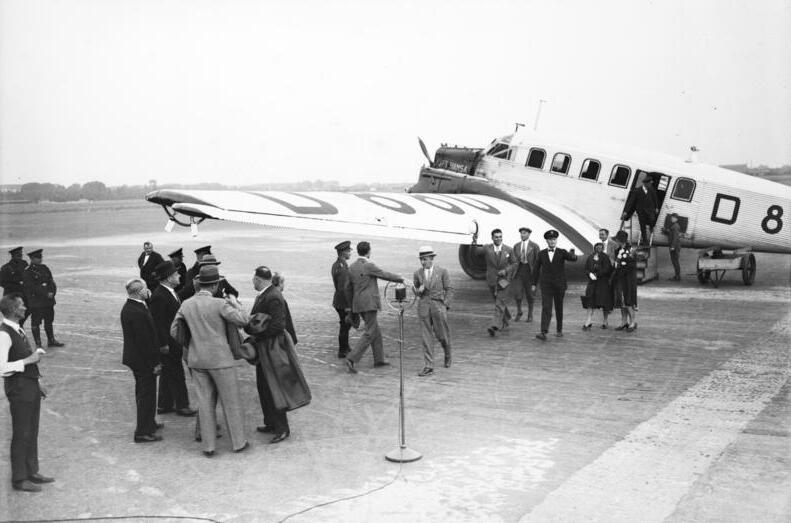
- Junkers G 24 in 1930

General information
- Type: Airliner-Transport
- Manufacturer: Junkers
- Primary users: Deutsche Luft Hansa Luftwaffe
- Number built: Germany: ~72; Sweden: 20 + 23 K 30s

History
- Manufactured: 1925-1929 (German production); 1924- (Sweden)
- Introduction date: 1925
- First flight: 19 September 1924

The Junkers G 24 was a German three-engine, all-metal low-wing monoplane passenger aircraft manufactured by Junkers from 1925. Junkers F 24 was the designation for single-engine versions of the same aircraft.

== Development ==
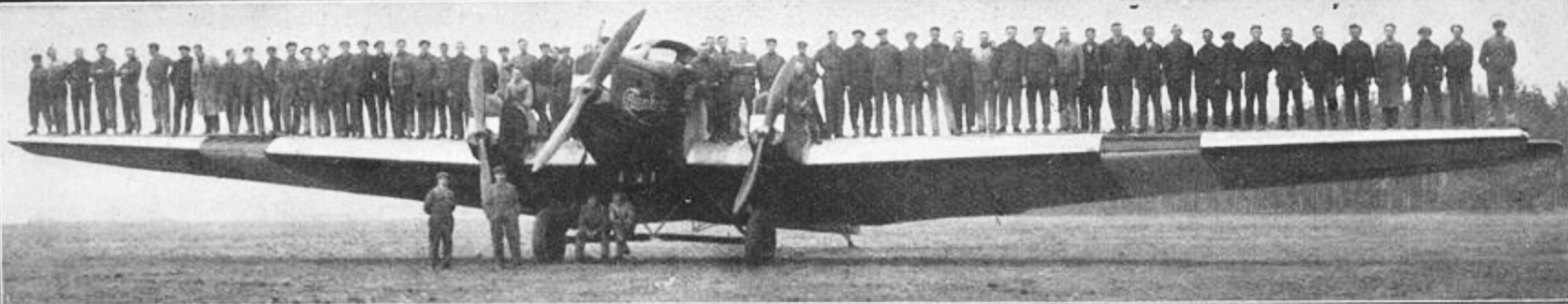
Stress test Junkers G 23

The increased German air traffic in the 1920s led to a requirement for a larger passenger transport aircraft. The G 24 was an enlarged development of the F 13. It was originally designed by Ernst Zindel as a single-engine aircraft. Under the restrictions imposed on aircraft in Germany by the Treaty of Versailles, only low powered engines were allowed. So the Junkers company designed their large G 24 airliner to be single-engined, but built it as a tri-motor. With three low powered engines the G 24 could fly, but was not a viable airliner. The plan was to sell the tri-motors to airlines outside of Germany, who would then install a single, high-powered engine (e.g. 450 hp Napier Lion) on the nose, and simply remove the wing center-section plugs that carried the other two engines. However the Military Inter-Allied Commission of Control declared the G 24 design to be a military type aircraft, and outlawed it.

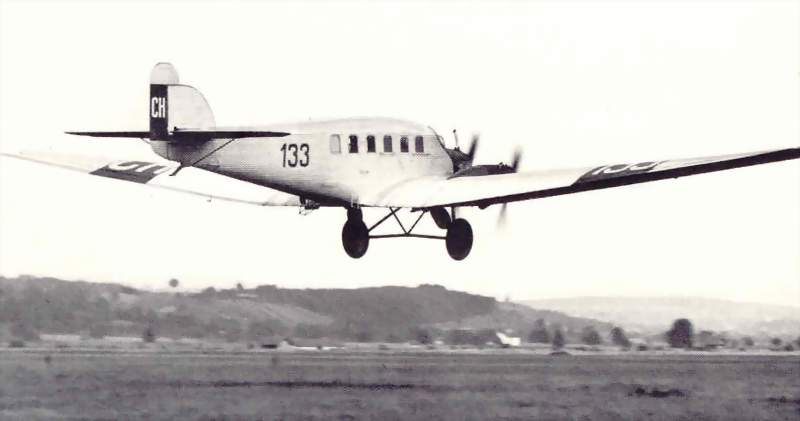
Junkers G.23 (CH-133) operated by Ad Astra Aero

Junkers then resubmitted what was essentially the same design, but under a new designation: Junkers G23. The Allied Commission ultimately allowed Junkers to build the G23, even in the single engined version, because it was clearly an airline type. The plane was always marketed under the G 24 designation.

Junkers continued to build the G 24/G 23 as a tri-motor, because the ruse to circumvent the Allied restrictions also had the benefit that the plane could fly, and even climb, with one engine out. In 1925 most airliners were single-engined, since one big engine will usually be more efficient than several small ones. Twin-engine types could not maintain altitude with an engine out, unless they were so overpowered that the airlines could not afford to operate them (similarly to how twinjets were impractical on long-range routes before the 1980s, and how trijets were used instead). A tri-motor did not have to be so grossly overpowered, to be able to fly with one engine out.

On 1 May 1926, the newly formed German airline Deutsche Luft Hansa started flying passengers on the route Berlin – Königsberg at night using its G 24 fleet. This was the first time any airline, anywhere in the world, flew passengers at night. Previously airlines had flown only mail and freight after dark. If an engine failed, the pilot bailed out by parachute, since a forced landing in the dark was then considered to be too dangerous. The G 24 could carry passengers, since there would not be any forced landings. The G 24s operated by Luft Hansa also had blind flying instruments and radio navigation (with the radio operator sitting in the passenger cabin, as there was no room in the open two seat cockpit.

The aircraft was manufactured in three main batches, with different engine alternatives. Between 1925 and 1929, at least 72 aircraft were manufactured, 26 of which went to Luft Hansa. The G 24 managed to set a number of aviation records involving pay loads. Fritz Horn flew 2,020 km (1,256 mi) with a payload of 1,000 kg (2,200 lb) on 14 h 23 min, having an average speed of 140 km/h (90 mph), setting a new world record.

On 24 July 1926, two G 24s became famous after having flown the 20,000 km (12,400 mi) route between Berlin and Peking in just 10 stops. This flight ended on 8 September. It was initially meant that they would fly all the way to Shanghai, but they were prevented by military conflicts. On 26 September 1926, the two aircraft landed again in Berlin. Later during the year, a trans-Euro-Asiatic line was created.

=== Military versions ===
The Soviet-German aircraft cooperation during the 1920s included a Soviet request for a new bomber aircraft. In response, Junkers prepared the Ju 25 twin-engine bomber. However, the development of this aircraft was deemed to be too expensive by Junkers, especially in light of several difficulties with his Russian partners. Accordingly, Junkers instructed his lead designers – Ernst Zindel and Hermann Pohlmann – to design a military derivate of the G 24. By November 1924, the new aircraft was ready; receiving the designation G3S1 24, it was a direct modification of the G 24ba. The aircraft was stated to be an air ambulance. Junkers followed up this design with several reconnaissance designs, such as the G1Sa 24, which was a modified G 24 with only a single engine. The next design, the G2sB 24 was also a bomber, directly derived from the G 24he. This aircraft had a new center wing section and a new nose section, to allow an open shooting area to the forward areas. Junkers decided to produce this design as the general military version of the G 24 and gave it the designation K 30 in 1926.

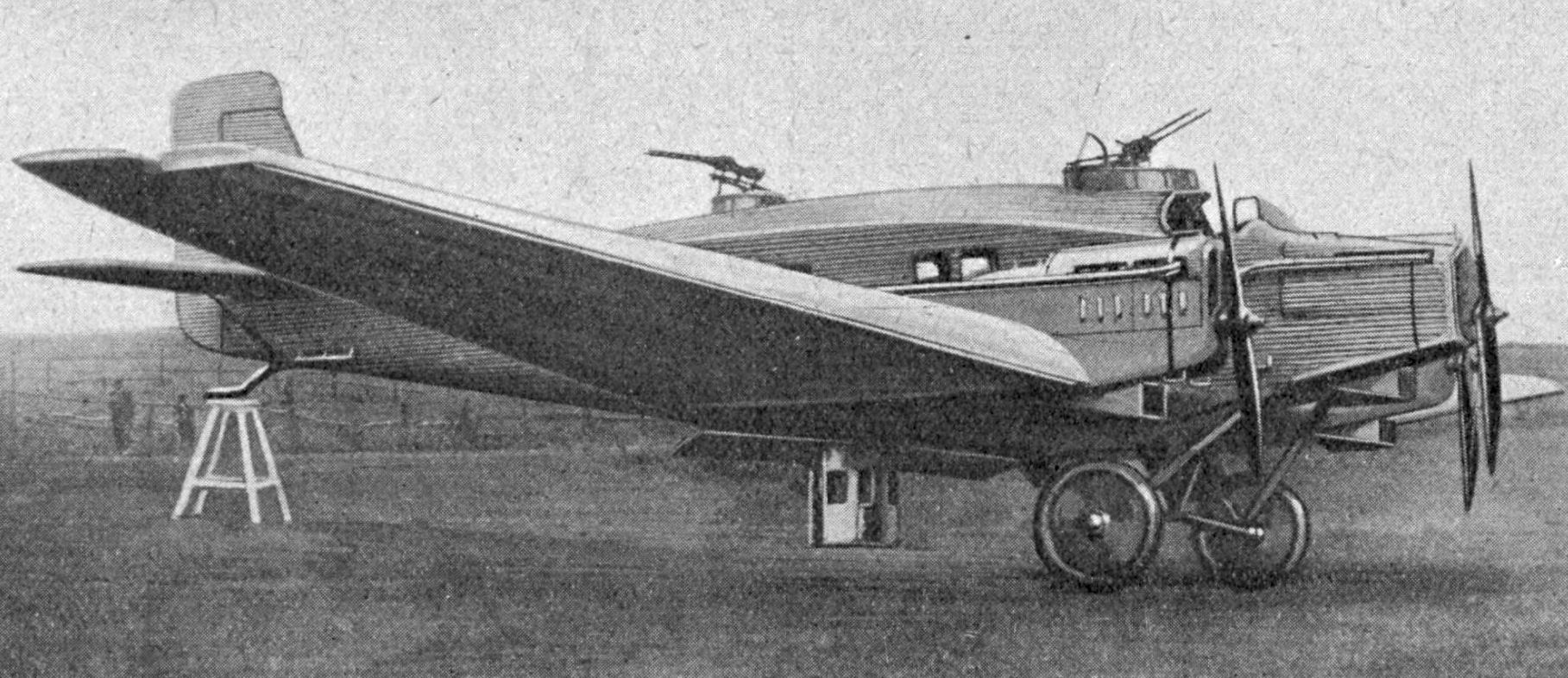
Junkers R 42 photo from L'Aéronautique October,1926

Junkers offered the K 30 design to the Soviet forces, which ordered a total of 23 K 30s in 1925 and 1926. A production line for the military version K 30 was set up at A.B. Flygindustri at Limhamn in Sweden as the German aviation industry was prevented from building military aircraft in 1926. The parts for the K 30 aircraft were built at Dessau and then shipped to Limhamn, where A.B. Flygindustri built the K 30 under the designation R 42. Some of the R 42s were equipped with machine gun positions and bomb mountings. But several of the R 42s were also shipped without military equipment to Russia. These were later fitted with military equipment at Junkers' factory in Fili, Moscow. The R 42/K 30 was designated JuG-1 in the Soviet Union. They received five 7.62 mm (.30 in) machine guns and could carry a bomb load of 500 kg (1,100 lb). This version was used to rescue the expedition of downed balloonist General Umberto Nobile in 1928.

Six more R 42s were delivered to Chile during 1926 plus three K 30s to Spain and two K 30s to Yugoslavia until 1931. The Spanish and Yugoslavian aircraft were produced at Dessau. The K 30 was equipped with either wheels, skis or floats. With the successful conversion of the G 24 into the single-engine aircraft F 24, Junkers was also thinking about a single-engine K 30 in 1931. Like the F 24, this K30do was to be equipped with the Jumo 4 engine and was similar to the initial G1Sa 24. However, no single-engine K 30s were built.

== Design ==
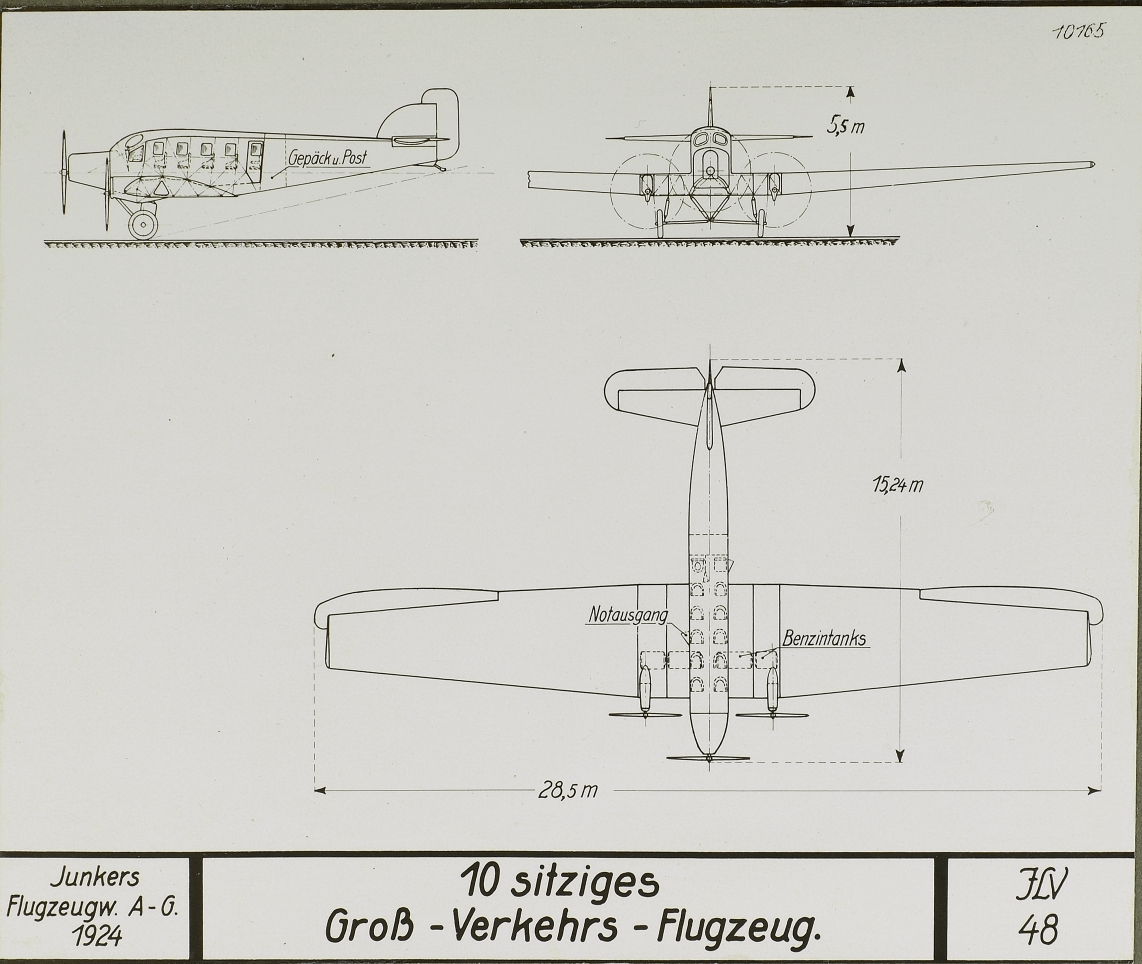
Original line drawings

The Junkers G 24 was a trimotor all-metal low-wing monoplane passenger aircraft. Its construction maintained the principles of the earlier and successful Junkers F 13 twin-engined airliner, while also building upon them. The trimotor configuration combines the advantageous propeller thrust characteristics of a centrally-positioned engine while the two wing-mounted engines provided an additional margin of safety via redundancy; the reserve energy of these engines exceeded 50 percent. Furthermore, this arrangement kept the structural drag, particularly in light of the streamlined cowlings for the wing-mounted engines that ensured smooth air flow around them, while the positioning of the propellers meant that any pieces thrown off from a broken propeller would not strike any vital part of the aircraft, unlike more commonplace tandem arrangements. The design incorporated measures for maintaining manoeuvrability in the event of a wing-mounted engine stalling.

Both the cantilever wings and fuselage were covered with corrugated sheets of duralumin, a feature that bolstered the material's ability to both absorb and distribute various stresses imposed upon it. The corrugated sheeting worked in conjunction with a series of bulkheads to fully absorb all of the fuselage stresses. The foundation for the aircraft's structure was the central section, which received the principal loads and worked in conjunction with the low-mounted wing which, in the event of a hard landing, provided considerable protection to the cabin and its occupants. The terminal bulkhead of the fuselage was secured to the framework using screw caps.

Sectional construction, a practice adopted from the earlier F 13, was practiced in various areas, including the wing, fuselage, supporting structure of the central engine, and those wing sections that supported the side engines. This construction principle enabled larger numbers of workers to effectively participate in the manufacturing process up to the aircraft's final assembly; it also facilitated ground transportation (sections could be easily loaded upon ordinary trucks) and the substitution of damaged sections. In the event of an engine sustaining damage, it could have been quickly removed and replaced. It was also possible to remove the complete wing section, including the engine and its mounting.

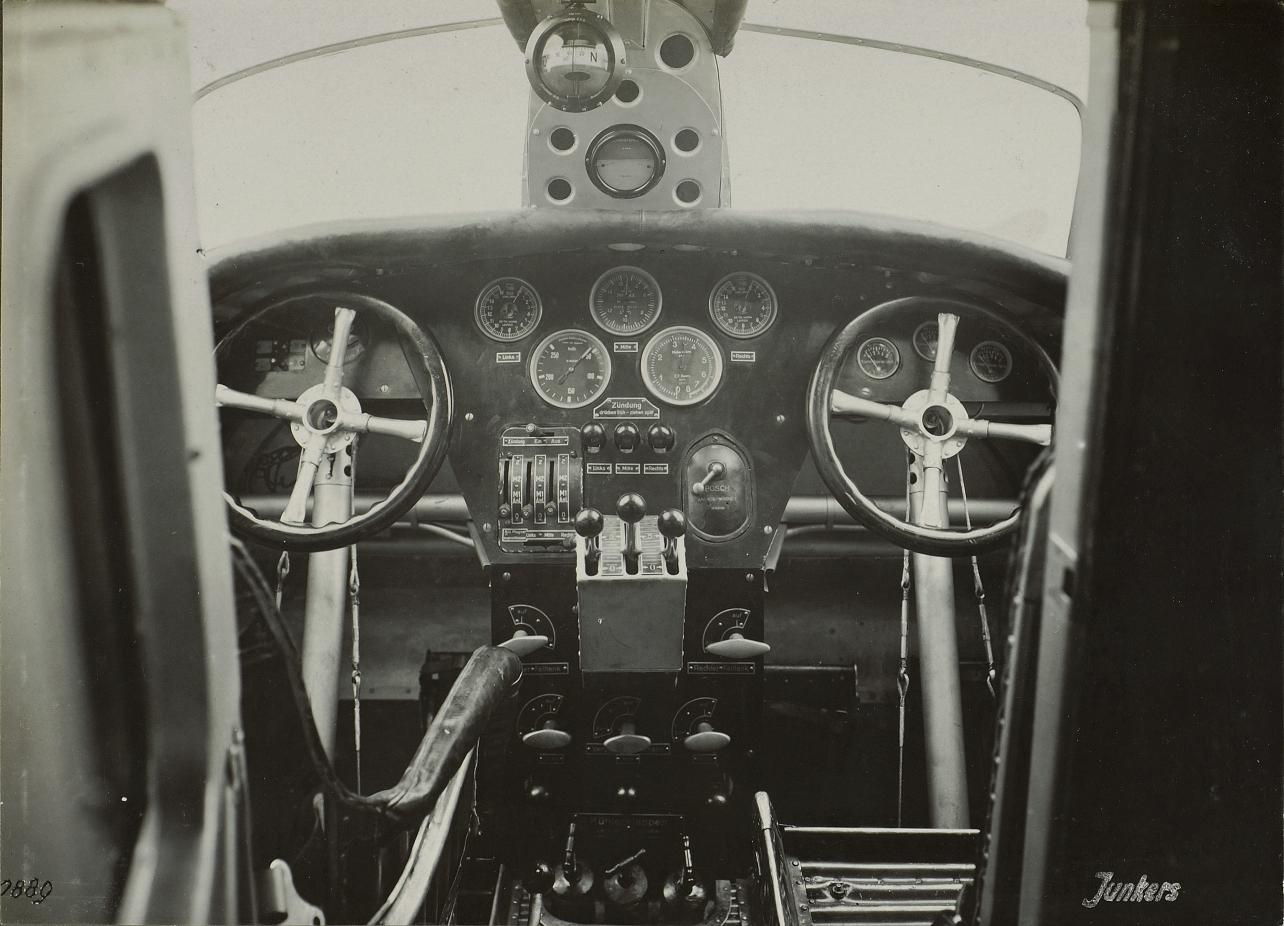
Cockpit of a G 23

In an airliner configuration, the cabin would be furnished with around 14 leather-covered chairs, each aligned to their own window, while an aisle permitted travellers to move about. A door was present between the cabin and the cockpit; a window was provided that provided passengers with a view of various instruments, including the altimeter and air-speed indicator. Nets were used to stow hand baggage while the majority of luggage was stored in a dedicated room alongside the toilet. The usable volume within the fuselage was relatively high towards the rear, an element that proved to be quite convenient for the travelling public as passengers did not have to remain in allocated positions, unlike many other airliners of the era, as equilibrium was maintained via adjustments made by the pilot to the stabiliser throughout the flight.

The cockpit was provided with extensive instrumentation and dual flight controls, the latter featured permitted a pair of pilots to relieve each other throughout long-distance flights. Wheels located between the pilots seats were used to adjust the stabiliser and rudder (the latter was typically used in the event of a wing-mounted engine stall). The rudder was typically controlled using pedals. Typical instruments included a compass, gyroscopic inclinometer, engine rev counter, thermometers (for the radiators), oil pressure indicator, fuel gauges, and longitudinal inclinometer. Other controls included the ignition switches, throttles, fuel cocks and shutter levels for regulating the radiator's temperature.

The undercarriage consisted of steel struts that were faired with sheet duralumin to lessen structural drag. It was attached by a combination of bolts and a set of bayonet fastenings, permitting its rapid removal. It featured a typical Junkers-designed shock absorber arrangement that was both proven and sturdy even in the event of rough landings; these were placed inside sheet duralumin that protected them from both debris and bad weather conditions, an arrangement that also had aerodynamic benefits. The undercarriage was outfitted with sizable disk-wheels and balloon tires that had a breaking strength of 20 metric tons. Akin to many of Junkers airplanes, it was possible to replace the standard undercarriage for land use with either floats or skis in a manner that was both practical and speedy to perform. These floats, which were entirely composed of aluminium, possessed so much displacement that float alone was sufficient to support the weight of the whole aircraft. The internal volume of the floats was divided into numerous water-tight compartments; sizable manholes were present to permit inspection of the interior spaces. While the float struts were attached to removable intermediate wing sections, the standard wheeled undercarriage attached only the fuselage.

== Operational history ==
The first G 24s were delivered at the start of 1925. By late 1927, the type was reportedly in operation across virtually all of the Central European scheduled air routes then in use.

Luft Hansa, which operated the largest G 24 fleet in the world, decided to modify their G 24s to a single engine standard. The first such modifications were performed in March 1928. The wing was shortened and the center engine was replaced with a BMW VIU engine. Junkers called this aircraft F 24ko. A total of 11 G 24s were modified to F 24 standard between 1928 and 1930. By July 1933, most of these BMW-equipped F 24s were again modified with the new Jumo 4 and designated as F 24kay. Most of these F 24s remained in service at the beginning of the Second World War in 1939. Most of them were used by Luft Hansa as freighter aircraft.

During 1926, the Finnish airline Aero O/Y acquired a Junkers G 24, which went into service on the Stockholm route. The aircraft was equipped with floats, but not skis, and so could be used in summer only. It remained in service until 1935.

A Swedish G 24 also participated in the rescue of the unfortunate Italian Umberto Nobile expedition to the North pole. This was the first time an aircraft had flown over the Arctic Sea without stops.

=== 1926 ===
- May 1 – Deutsche Luft Hansa starts the first passenger night flights from Berlin to Königsberg.
- July 24 – The Peking expedition flight: A Luft Hansa expedition flew to Peking, a flight of over 20,000 km (12,400 mi). Two G 24s, the D-901 and D-903 participated

=== 1927 ===
- April 1 – World distance record with 2,000 kg (4,410 lb) payload. Waldemar Roeder achieved a new world distance record with a G 24L with 2,000 kg (4,410 lb) payload with 1,013.18 km (629.56 mi) in 7 hours and 52 minutes.
- April 4 – World distance record with 1,000 kg (2,200 lb) payload. Fritz Horn achieved a new distance record with a G 24L with 1,000 kg (2,200 lb) payload with 2,026.36 km (1,259.12 mi) in 14 hours and 23 minutes.
- April 10 – World speed record with 2,000 kg (4,410 lb) payload over 500 km ( mi). Hermann Roeder achieved a new speed record with a G 24L with 2,000 kg (4,410 lb) payload over 500 km (310 mi) with 175.75 km/h (109.21 mph). During the same flight, the record for 2,000 kg (4,410 lb) over 100 km (60 mi) was also achieved with 179.24 km/h (111.37 mph)
- June 1 – World speed record with 2,000 kg (4,410 lb) payload over 100 km (60 mi). The Junkers pilot Zimmermann achieved a new speed record with a G 24L with 2,000 kg (4,410 lb) payload over 100 km (60 mi) with 207.26 km/h (128.79 mph). The record flight was performed between the turning points at Dessau and Leipzig.
- June 28 – World speed record. Zimmermann achieved the speed record with 1,000 kg (2,200 lb) payload with 209.115 km/h (129.938 mph)
- August 4 – The South Atlantic expedition flight. A G 24h1e belonging to Severa took off from Norderney to the Azores from where it was planned to cross the North Atlantic as the first aircraft from East to West. But the operation had to be stopped due to a crash at the Azores.
- August 6 – a K 30 seaplane performed FAI World Record Flights. Over a distance of 1,000 km (620 mi) and with a payload of 1,000 kg (2,200 lb), the K 30 reached a speed of 171 km/h (106 mph). The flight time of 10 h 42 min 45 sec was also a FAI Record, as well as the flight distance of 1,176 km (731 mi).

=== 1928 ===
- June 23 – The Afghanistan expedition flight. One G 24 and two F 13 aircraft started an Afghanistan expedition flight

== Accidents and incidents ==
- On 6 November 1929, a Deutsche Luft Hansa Junkers G 24bi Oberschlesien (registration D-903) crashed after striking trees on a hill in Marden Park, Surrey, England, while attempting to return to Croydon Airport, London, in thick fog after taking off from Croydon for a flight to Amsterdam in the Netherlands. All four crew members and three of the four passengers died.
- On 7 February 1930, Chilean Air Force Junkers R-42 J6 ditched off Punta Arenas due to engine failure, killing three of six on board.
- On 7 November 1930, a Syndicato Condor Junkers G 24 (P-BAHA, named Potyguar) sank off Iguape, São Paulo, killing one of eight on board.
- On 31 August 1932, an AB Aerotransport Junkers G 24 (SE-AAE, named Svealand) crashed at Tubbingen, Netherlands while the crew was attempting a forced landing after the number three engine failed, killing both pilots.
- On 1 October 1938, a Syndicato Condor G.24ce (PP-CAB, Ypiranga) made an emergency landing at the port of Coruripe, with no fatalities. The aircraft was later scrapped.
- On 24 August 1939, a Deutsche Luft Hansa Junkers F.24 (D-ULIS, named Düsseldorf) force-landed at Glindow, Germany following an engine fire, killing both pilots. The aircraft was manufactured in 1925 as a three-engined G 24 and was converted to an F 24kay in December 1931 as a test bed for the Junkers Jumo 4 engine. In 1936 the aircraft was re-engined with a Daimler-Benz DB 600 V12 for test flights, and a DB 601 V12 in 1938 for 200 hours of test flying, and it was during one of these test flights that the engine caught fire, leading to the crash.

== Variants ==
Data from:Hugo Junkers Pionier der Luftfahrt – Seine Flugzeuge, Junkers Aircraft & Engines 1913–1945

G 24 Prototype
Powered by one 130 kW (180 hp) BMW IIIa and two 75 kW (100 hp) Mercedes D.I engines in 1924.
G 24
Improved version with one 145 kW (195 hp) Junkers L2 (195 hp) and two 120 kW (160 hp) Mercedes D.IIIa engines in 1925
G 24a
Powered by three 145 kW (195 hp) Junkers L2 engines, attachment on wings, smaller engine cowlings, sometimes also a 230 kW (310 hp) Junkers L5 as a central engine. Two aircraft destined for Italy were fitted with 221 kW (296 hp) Isotta Fraschini central engines.
G 24ba
with three Junkers L2, strengthened attachments and engine mountings
G 24b1a
seaplane version of the G 24ba for Aero O/Y
G 24bi
with one Junkers L5 center engine and two L2 engines
G 24ce
with three Junkers L5, enlarged wing attachment since 1926
G 24e
with three Junkers L5
G 24de
strengthened attachments, smaller engine cowlings
G 24fe
enlarged center wing attachments
G 24ge
further enlarged wing attachments
G 24g1e
seaplane version of G 24ge, used for torpedo experiments
G 24gu
one 317 kW (425 hp) Junkers L5G central engine and two Junkers L5
G 24gn
230 kW (310 hp) Junkers L5 center engine with 310 kW (420 hp), one built
G 24he
with modified wing, separate undercarriage, aerodynamic cockpit, 14 passengers
G 24h1e
seaplane version of G 24he
G 24hu
with three BMW Va engines, one built
G 24li
modified G 24a/b with Junkers L5 center engine
G 24mai
Two modified G 24e aircraft with a 190 kW (250 hp) Isotta Fraschini Asso 200 centre engine for Italy
G 24nao
with three Rhone Jupiter engines, prototype for the K30
G 24L
with three 317 kW (425 hp) Junkers L5G engines

F 24kae
was a single test bench for DB 600/DB 601 engines.
F 24kai
a single test bench for the Jumo 211 engine
F 24kau
with BMW VIau
F 24kay

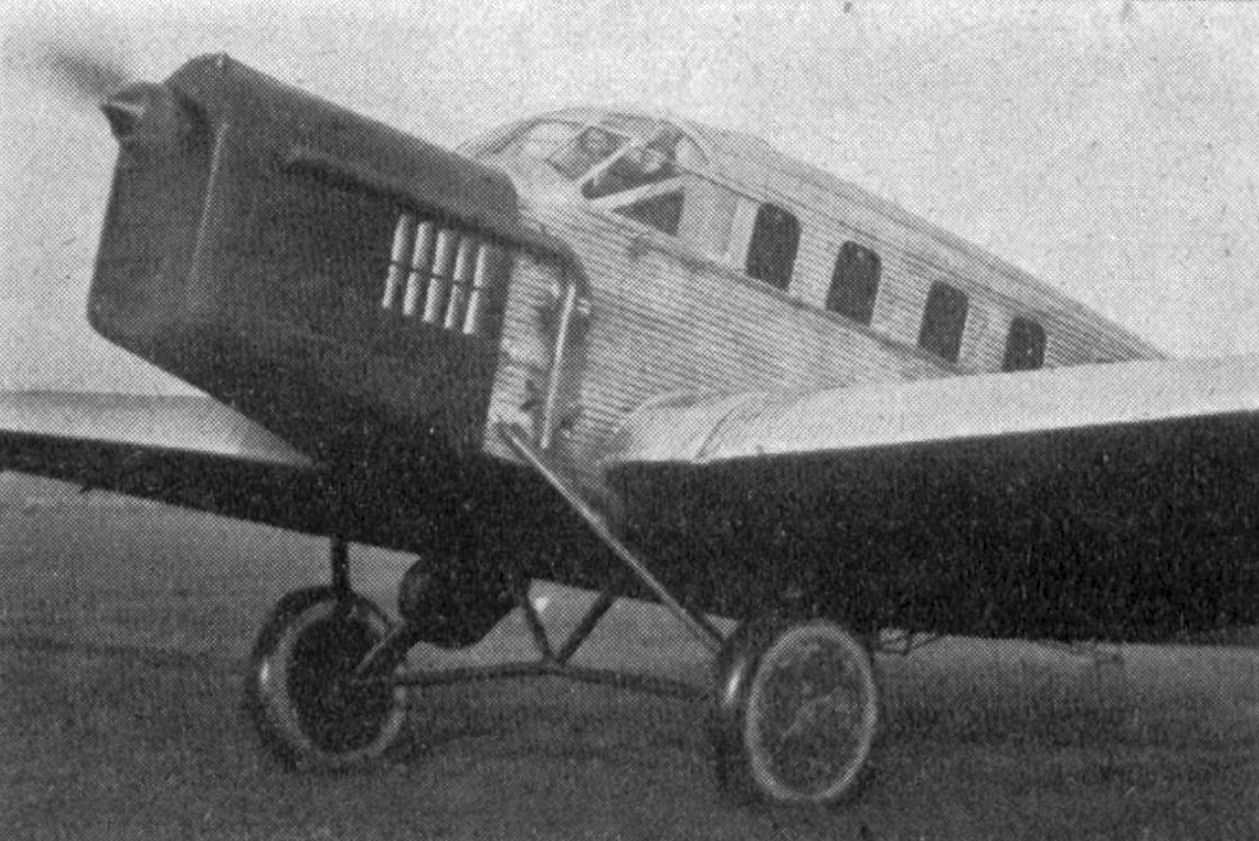
Junkers F 24kay photo from L'Aérophile December,1929

Test bench for Jumo 4 in October 1933 (c/n 839), plus surviving Deutsche Luft Hansa F 24ko aircraft re-engined with Jumo 4 engines.
F 24ko
with a single BMW VIU engine

G3 S1 24
a projected ambulance aircraft from 1924, three Junkers L2 engines
G1 Sa 24
a projected reconnaissance aircraft from 1924, single-engine
G2 Sb 24
a projected bomber aircraft with several three-engine approaches
K 30
military G 24 version of 1926
K 30b
a fictitious Russian designation for the land version of the K 30 (not the official Junkers designation)
K 30c
a fictitious Russian designation for the seaplane version of K 30 (not the official Junkers designation)
K 30do
single-engine version of the K 30 of 1931, with a Jumo 4;not built
W 41
test bench for Fo 4 diesel engine in August 1928 (c/n 843)
TB-2
Soviet military designation for the K 30 (not the official Junkers designation)
YuG-1
designation for Fili military conversions of the K 30/R 42

== Operators ==
Afghanistan

- Afghan Air Force

Austria

- Ölag

Brazil

- Syndicato Condor

Chile

- Chilean Air Force

Finland
Aero O/Y
Germany

- Deutsche Luft Hansa
- Luftwaffe
- Condor Syndikat

Greece

- SCHA
- Hellenic Air Force

Italy

- Ala Littoria
- Regia Aeronautica
- Transadriatica

Poland

- Aerolot operated one Junkers G 23W floatplane in 1925, but returned it to the producer later the same year

Spain

- Unión Aérea Española
- CLASSA
- LAPE
- Spanish Republican Air Force

Sweden

- AB Aerotransport

Switzerland

- Ad Astra Aero
- Swissair

Turkey
Soviet Union

- Aeroflot
- Soviet Air Force

Yugoslavia

- Yugoslav Royal Air Force

== Specifications (G.24he) ==
Data from Junkers Aircraft & Engines 1913–1945, Hugo Junkers Pionier der Luftfahrt – Seine Flugzeuge

General characteristics

- Crew: 2
- Capacity: 14 passengers
- Length: 15.8 m (51 ft 10 in)
- Wingspan: 29.37 m (96 ft 4 in)
- Height: 5.80 m (19 ft 0 in)
- Wing area: 99 m^{2} (1,070 sq ft)
- Empty weight: 4,330 kg (9,546 lb)
- Gross weight: 7,200 kg (15,873 lb)
- Powerplant: 3 × Junkers L5 six-cylinder in-line water-cooled piston engine, 230 kW (310 hp) each

Performance

- Maximum speed: 210 km/h (130 mph, 110 kn)
- Cruise speed: 170 km/h (110 mph, 92 kn)
- Range: 660 km (410 mi, 360 nmi)
- Service ceiling: 4,000 m (13,000 ft) with maximum payload
- Rate of climb: 2.47 m/s (486 ft/min)
- Time to altitude: 2,000 m (6,600 ft) in 13.5 minutes

== See also ==
Related development

- Junkers G 31
- Junkers Ju 52
