= Junkers A 32 =

A 32 and K 39
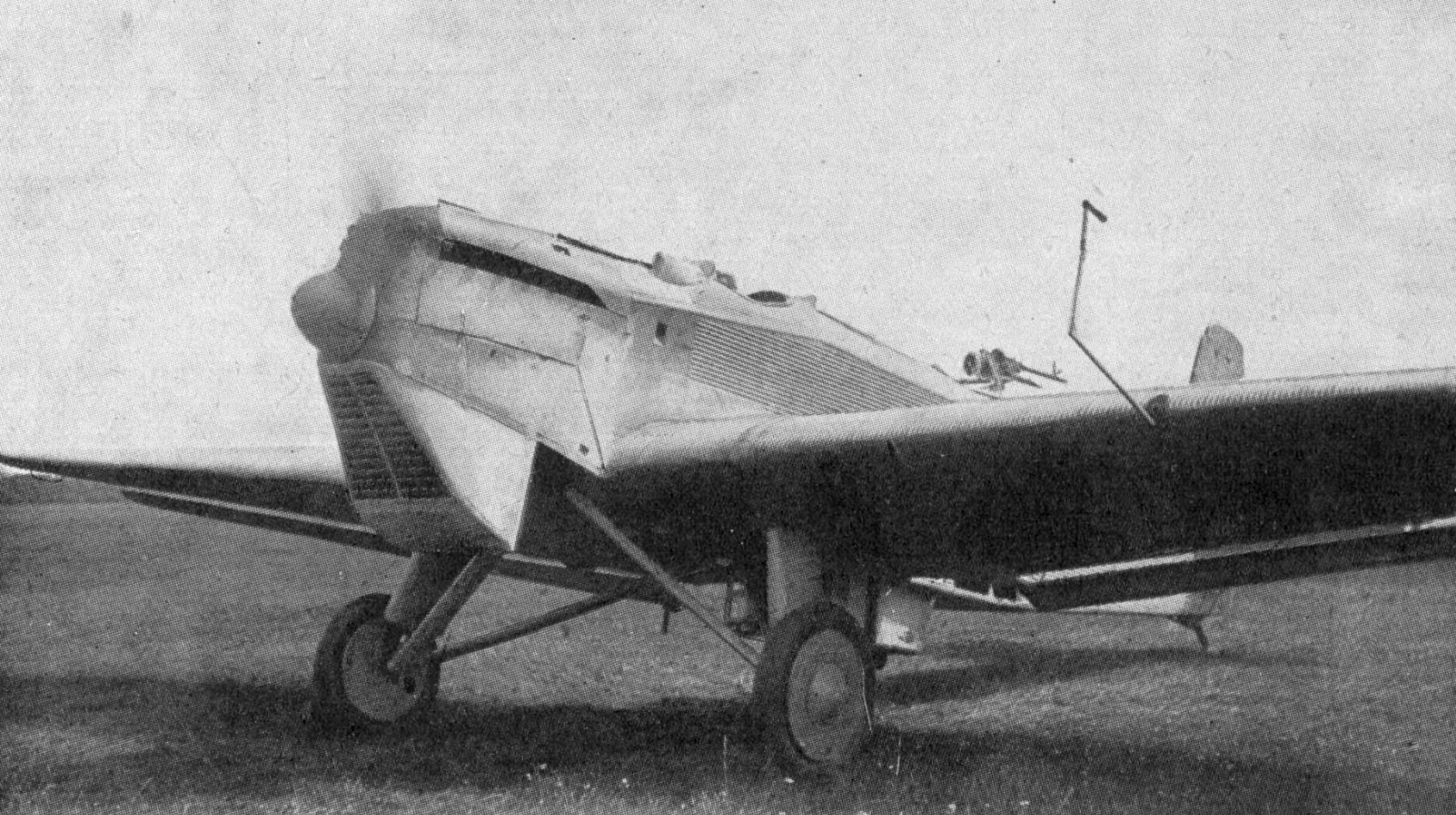
- K 39

General information
- Type: Mail plane
- National origin: Germany
- Manufacturer: Junkers
- Designer: Ernst Zindel
- Number built: 2

History
- First flight: 1926

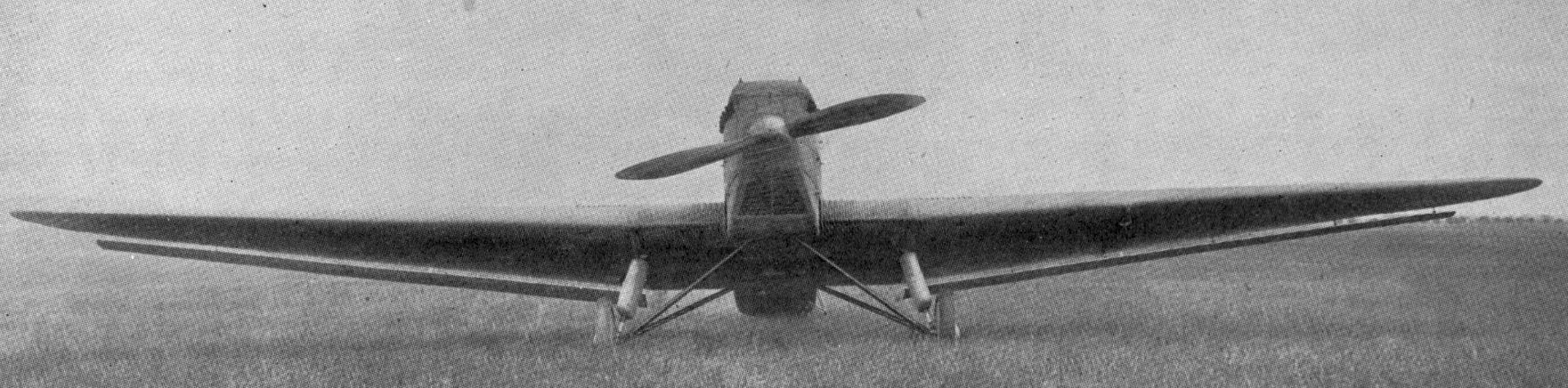
Front view of the A 32

The Junkers A 32 was a mail plane built in prototype form in Germany in the late 1920s, and later developed as a prototype reconnaissance-bomber under the designation K 39. The design was a conventional low-wing cantilever monoplane with fixed tailskid undercarriage. Construction was metal throughout, with corrugated duralumin skin. Three open cockpits were provided in tandem; the third seat intended from the outset to accommodate a tail gunner for a military version of the aircraft. In fact, the militarised version developed in Sweden by AB Flygindustri featured a fourth crew position as well, for a bombardier. This version featured twin machine guns built into the engine cowling, and a trainable machine gun for the tail gunner.

Only two A 32s were built, and the first prototype was destroyed in a crash on 2 November 1927 that killed Junkers engineer Karl Plauth. The sole K 39 constructed may have been modified from the second prototype. No sales of either the civil or military version ensued.

== Specifications (K 39) ==
General characteristics

- Crew: Four - pilot, observer, gunner, and bombardier
- Length: 11.10 m (36 ft 5 in)
- Wingspan: 17.8 m (58 ft 5 in)
- Height: 3.38 m (11 ft 1 in)
- Wing area: 40.0 m^{2} (430 sq ft)
- Empty weight: 2,150 kg (4,730 lb)
- Gross weight: 3,480 kg (7,660 lb)
- Powerplant: 1 × Junkers L55 , 447 kW (600 hp)

Performance

- Maximum speed: 230 km/h (140 mph, 120 kn)
- Range: 830 km (520 mi, 450 nmi)

Armament

- 2 × fixed, forward-firing machine guns
- 1 × trainable, rearward-firing machine gun
- 100 kg (220 lb) bombs
