= Junkers G 31 =

1926 German airliner family

G 31
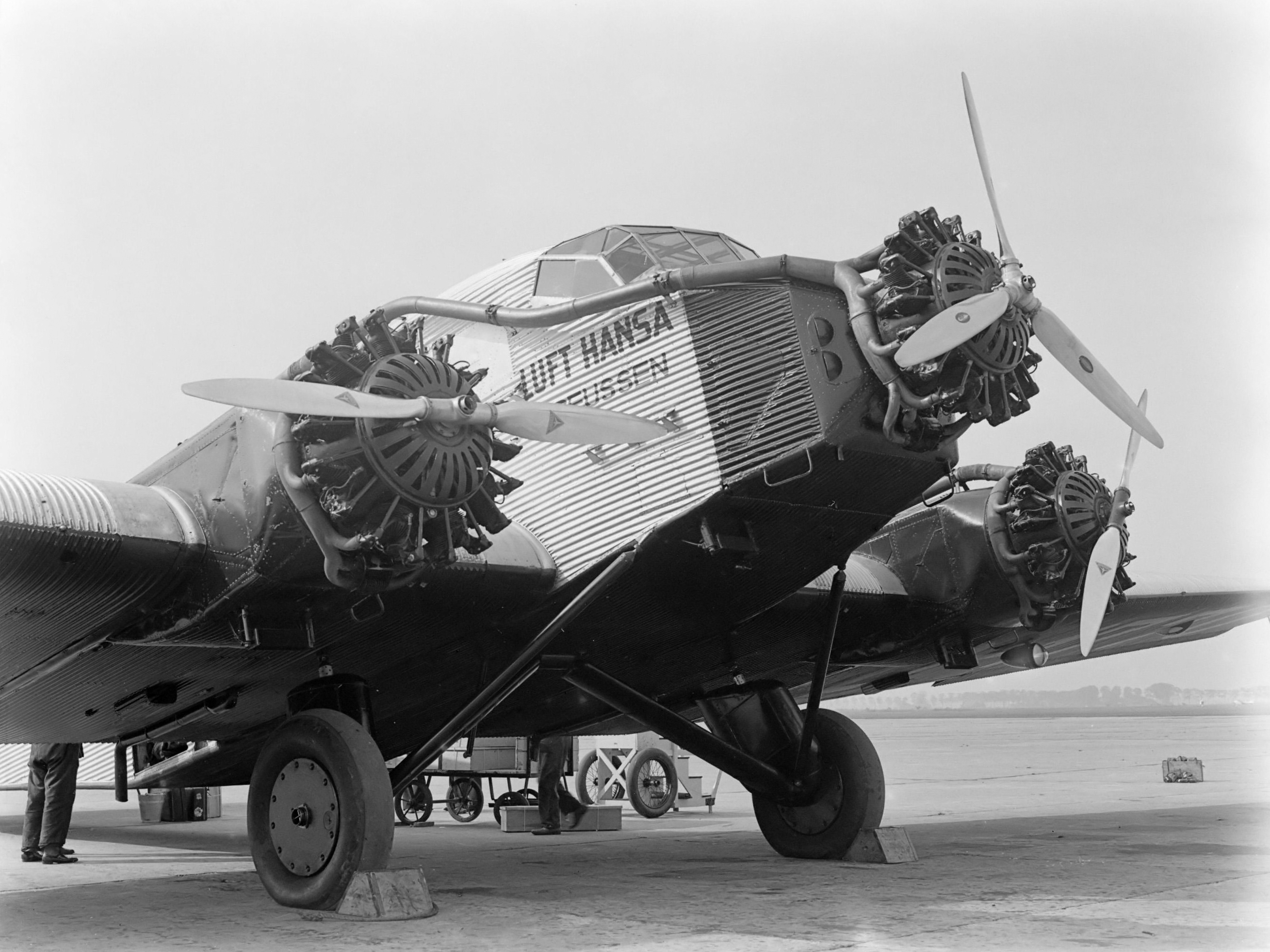
- Junkers G31

General information
- Type: Airliner
- National origin: Germany
- Manufacturer: Junkers
- Primary user: Deutsche Luft Hansa
- Number built: 13

History
- First flight: 1926

The Junkers G 31 was an advanced tri-motor airliner designed and produced by the German aircraft manufacturer Junkers. It would be the first airliner operated by Deutsche Luft Hansa to feature a flight attendant.

Development of the G 31 took place during the mid 1920s, having been encouraged by the positive reception of the Junkers G 24, a more compact tri-motor airliner. It was decided to incorporate all-metal construction and an aerodynamically 'clean' configuration, features that were not yet in widespread use at that time. Ambitions to adopt retractable landing gear for the G 31 were abandoned in favour of a fixed arrangement as the additional weight incurred a performance penalty that did not justify the improved aerodynamics while retracted. A variety of engines were used as the intended primary powerplant, the Junkers L5, was deemed to be too low-powered.

== Development ==
Upon the realisation that the Junkers G 24, a tri-motor airliner, was set to be a commercial success, Professor Hugo Junkers quickly sought to produce an advanced follow up. This aircraft would be a clean sheet design; in comparison to the G 24, it would be larger and provide for greater passenger comfort while also being simpler both to operate and maintain. The G 31 was the first Deutsche Luft Hansa airliner to feature a flight attendant, who both served food and drinks (which were not complimentary). This service earned the G 31 the nickname 'flying dining car' ('fliegender Speisewagen' in German). In reference to its relatively large fuselage for the era, it was also called the flying moving van ('fliegender Möbelwagen' in German).

Professor Hugo Junkers originally requested the G 31 to have landing gear that would retract into the wings. After extensive wind tunnel experiments Ernst Zindel, the leader of the design team, persuaded Professor Junkers that the gain in speed, provided by reduced air resistance, would not outweigh the increased weight, cost, and complexity of either retractable landing gear or simple wheel fairings. The tail skid incorporated a roller as to avoid damage to grass airfields.

The intended powerplant was three Junkers L5 inline engines, however, testing proved the L5 to produce too little power. While considering alternatives, the adoption of the Napier Lion was suggested; at the time, the Lion was a powerful engine that some figures considered to be the best aero engine available ("the best engine for the best plane"). However, this powerplant was too expensive, especially since it would have had to be paid for in convertible currency, not German Reichsmark. The majority of G 31s flew with foreign air-cooled radial engines in the 500 hp range, which were typically license-built in Germany (see list of variants below).

== Design ==
The Junkers G 31 was a trimotor all-metal low-wing monoplane passenger aircraft that shared its basic configuration with that of the preceding Junkers G 24. Duralumin was the most commonly used material; others include cast electrum and silumin, which were used for relatively low-stressed complicated form pieces, less important fittings, and elements such as the bearing housings. Corrugated sheets of duralumin covered the exterior of the wing, which was built in the-then typical Junkers technique, its structure comprising a tubular frame. A total of three exterior doors, one into the passenger cabin and two into the baggage hold, were present.

The fuselage was divided into several section, the forward section of which accommodated the aircraft's nose-mounted third engine while the middle section contained the cockpit, passenger cabin, baggage compartment, and auxiliary apparatus. The wing was similarly divided into sections; the middle section was mounted directly into the lower fuselage and acted to support it while the two intermediate sections carried the two wing-mounted engines as well as accommodated the aircraft's six fuel tanks. This practice of subdivision, while increasing the overall weight of the aircraft, brought numerous practical advantages for both the construction and operation of large aircraft, such as readily facilitating shipping and repair works. To this end, sections were joined and held together using easily removable screws. The wing was directly loaded, akin to the G 24; however, the loading was distributed across a greater portion of the wing. Flaps were present along the trailing edge of the wing that reduced the aircraft's landing speed by ten percent when deployed.

The cockpit was typically operated by a pair of pilots. Amongst the flight controls were a series of hand wheels, used to actuate the elevator and ailerons, and pedals to operate the rudder. The majority of instrumentation was on a centre-mounted panel placed between the two pilots; in addition to standard apparatus of the era, it was provisioned with dial indicators for the stabilizer and rudder-adjusting devices, hand pumps, and keys for radiotelegraphy. Optionally, each pilot could be provided with their own compass and inclinometer. The right-hand pilot could, following the removal of the back of their chair, operate the radio switchboard that was suspended behind him in the auxiliary apparatus room. This room contained, in addition to the radiotelegraphy apparatus, contained an auxiliary power unit (APU) that provided compressed air for the main engine starter along with an electric generator to produce power. Another room just aft of the cockpit was the forward freight compartment, which was designed to handle light packages and air mail.

The cabin was partitioned into three compartments, along with a passageway for access. This space typically accommodated eleven comfortable leather seats arranged in pairs along with four jumpseats for passengers, a single jumpseat for the steward, and an enclosed lavatory to the rear. Each pair of seats was aligned with a pair of sliding window panes of non-breakable triplex glass; individual ventilation was provisioned for each compartment along with electric ceiling lamps. The cabin could be heated via pipes carrying hot air that were located underneath the seats. For conducting night flights, up to ten beds could be installed in place of the passenger seats. In an air ambulance configuration, up to 15 beds could be carried. The walls coverings were installed upon thin metal frames and could be readily removed for cleaning or replacement.

Both the cockpit and passenger cabin were effectively protected (for the era) against hard landings; the tubular framework of the aircraft's structure was relatively sturdy while the baggage compartment, located underneath the cabin, also served to cushion such an impact somewhat. Furthermore, the positioning of the wing-mounted engines was such that, in event of a propeller breaking, no fragments would be sent towards either the occupants or any vital areas of the aircraft itself. The central section of the fuselage had a strong framework that was reinforced by a series of bulkheads and transverse frames and entirely covered with corrugated sheet duralumin. Freight within the main hold had to be distributed appropriately to keep the aircraft well balanced. A channel underneath the main cabin carried the flight control linkages from the cockpit to the flight control surfaces in the tail; it could be accessed via trapdoors in the cabin floor. Access to the rear portion of the fuselage was possible via a door behind the removable seats at the rear of the cabin.

The horizontal empennage of the aircraft was relatively large and provided effective stability even when fully loaded and the centre of gravity trending toward the rear. The stabilizer was adjustable mid-flight from the cockpit while the elevator was balanced. The vertical empennage comprised a pair of fins and rudders. The aircraft could easily be kept flying straight ahead even with one of the wing-mounted engines stopped. In the event of an extended flight with one of the wing engines inactive, the exertions of the constant deflection of the rudders could be offset by a flexible adjusting device. Every movable element of the aircraft, including the stabilizer, were mounted on adjustable ball bearings. The landing gear lacked a continuous axle; its design was atypically simple and sturdy for the era. Each wheel had its own axle, steering rod, and shock absorber.

A total of three engines powered the aircraft, producing a total output of 1,100-1,200 hp dependent upon the specific powerplant fitted. The G 31 could maintain level flight with a single engine stopped. Directly aft of each engine was a firewall to lower the threat posed by a fire. Fuel, which was stored in six tanks within the intermediate wing sections, was typically delivered via centrifugal pumps to a single gravity feed tank suspended above the ceiling of the cockpit, although it could also be delivered directly from the pumps to the carburettors. Cooling for the engines was achieved using Junkers-designed radiators. Compressed air would be normally used to start up the engines.

== Operational history ==
Originally, the G 31 had been intended to equip Junkers' airline, Junkers Luftverkehr, but this ambition was disrupted by the merger of the airline into Deutsche Luft Hansa in 1926. While the new airline did opt to procure the type, Deutsche Luft Hansa only ever purchased eight G 31s. Its fleet commenced operations in May 1928, the type being typically used on the long-range routes of Luft Hansa, particularly to Scandinavia. The G 31 continued in this role with the airline until 1935, at which point they were replaced by the newer and more successful Junkers Ju 52.

Four other G 31s were sold for freighting cargo in New Guinea. Operated by Guinea Airways, one was owned by the airline itself, while the other three were owned by the Bulolo Gold Dredging Company. Powered by Pratt & Whitney Hornets, these differed from the G 31 airliners in having open cockpits and a large hatch in the fuselage roof to accommodate the loading of bulky cargo via crane. In one particular operation, the G 31s were used to airlift eight 3,000 tonne (3,310 ton) dredges (in parts) from Lae to Bulolo. Three of the aircraft were destroyed in a Japanese air raid on Bulolo on 21 January 1942, and the remaining aircraft were pressed into Royal Australian Air Force (RAAF) service ten days later. This machine (construction number 3010, registration VH-UOW) was seriously damaged in an accident at Laverton, Victoria on 31 October that year after it careered off the runway and collided with and destroyed the Minister for Air's car. Although judged beyond repair by the RAAF, it eventually returned to freighter use in New Guinea for some time after the conflict.

Unlike the earlier Junkers G 24, the G 31 was not a commercial success; only 13 aircraft were ever sold, as opposed to 54 civilian G 24s along with +30 military derivatives). Compared to the G 24, it offered greater comfort to its passengers, while in comparison to the more conventional biplane airliners of the 1920s, the G 31 was both faster and safer, the latter aspect being largely attributable to its all-metal construction. However, the aircraft's purchase price and operating costs were both higher. Instead of the newly designed G 31, a developed version of the G 24 might have sold better.

== Accidents and incidents ==
25 September 1928
Deutsche Luft Hansa G 31de (c/n J3004; registration D-1427; named Deutschland) crash-landed and burned due to an engine fire.
11 December 1928
Deutsche Luft Hansa G 31fi, registration D-1473 and named Rhineland, crashed at Letzlingen due to weather, killing three of four on board.
May 1936
An RLM G 31fo (c/n 3008, D-ABIL) collided with Junkers Ju 52/3m D-APUT.

== Variants ==
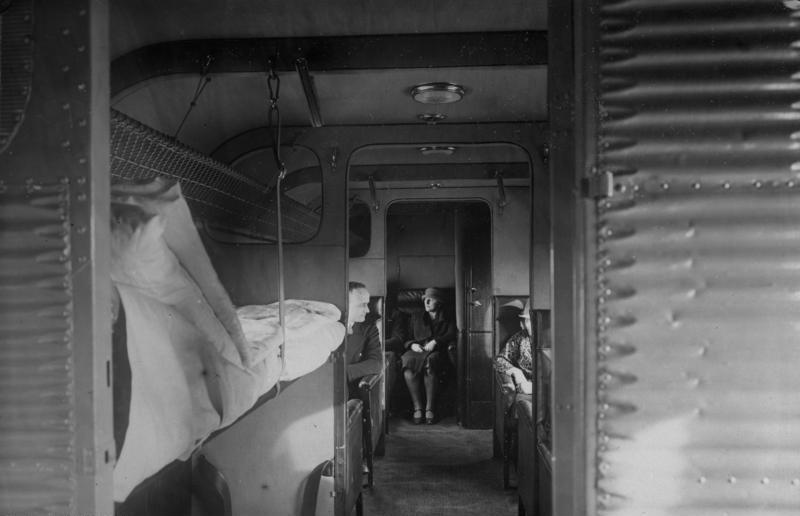
Junkers G 31 Cabin with beds

- G 31.1 – prototype with three Junkers L5 engines
- G 31.2 – as G 31.1 with centre engine replaced with BMW VI
- G 31ba – production version of G 31.2
- G 31de – version with three Gnome et Rhone-built Bristol Jupiter VI engines, enclosed cockpit and second tailfin
- G 31fi – version with three Siemens-built Bristol Jupiter engines, and enlarged wing and fuselage
- G 31fo – version with three BMW-built Pratt & Whitney Hornet engines
- G 31ho – as G 31fo with centre engine replaced with Pratt & Whitney Hornet
- G 31go – freighter version for New Guinea with open cockpit and 3.60 m × 1.50 m (11 ft 10 in × 5 ft) cargo hatch in roof.

== Operators ==
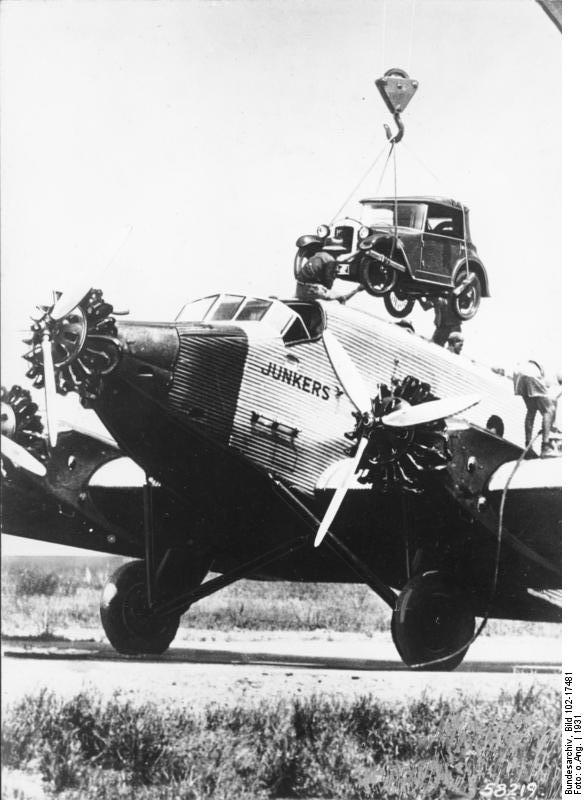
Junkers G 31go

Australia

- Trust Territory of New Guinea
- Royal Australian Air Force

Germany

- Deutsche Luft Hansa

== Specifications (G 31fo) ==
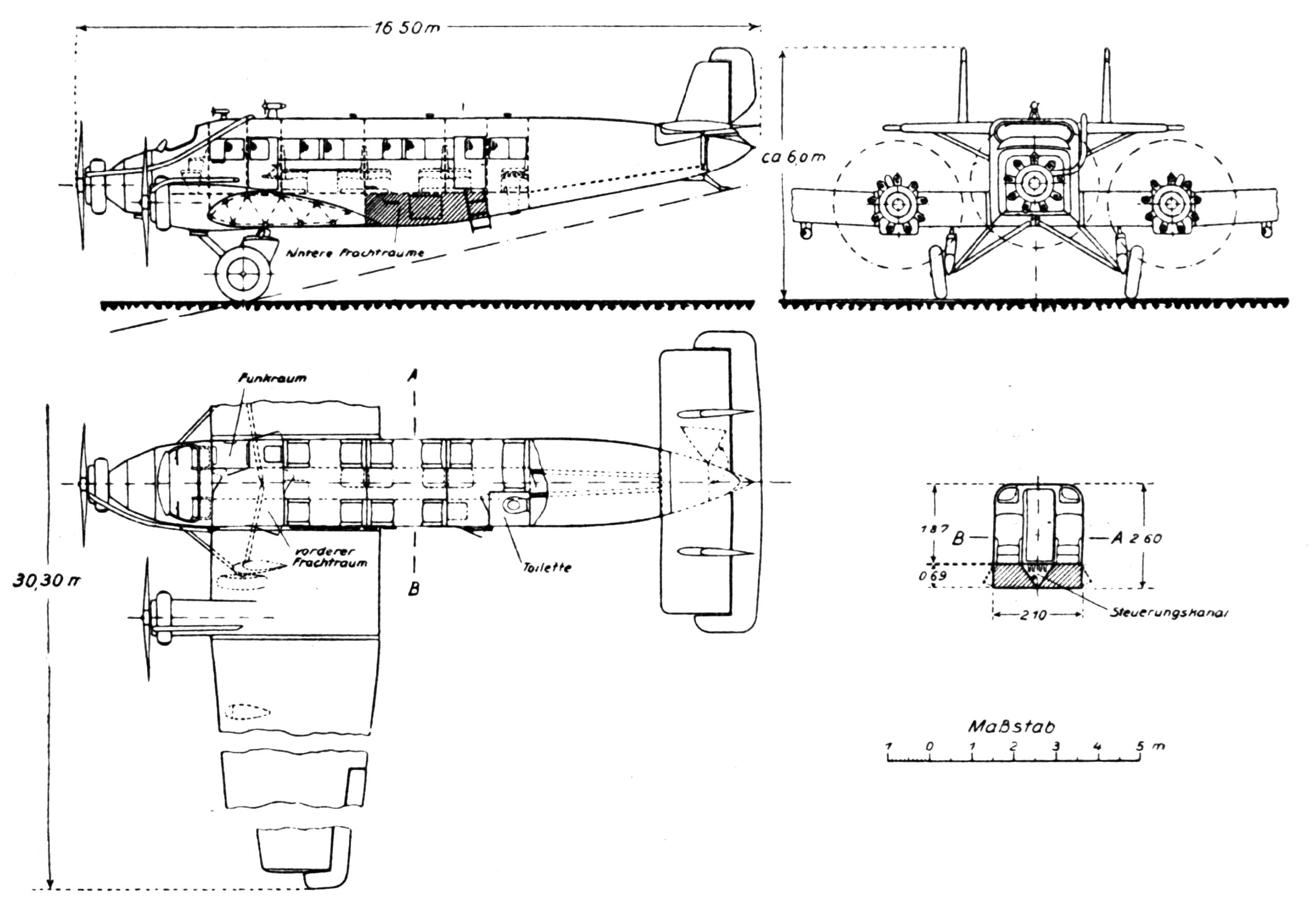
Junkers G.31 3-view drawing from L'Aérophile November,1927

Data from Hugo Junkers Pionier der Luftfahrt – Seine Flugzeuge, National Advisory Committee for Aeronautics

General characteristics

- Crew: two pilots, one radio operator, and one steward
- Capacity: 15 passengers (day service configuration using chairs) or ten passengers (night service configuration using beds)
- Length: 16.50 m (54 ft 1 in)
- Wingspan: 30.50 m (100 ft 0 in)
- Height: 6.00 m (19 ft 8 in)
- Wing area: 102.0 m^{2} (1,097 sq ft)
- Empty weight: 5,250 kg (11,590 lb)
- Gross weight: 8,500 kg (18,760 lb)
- Powerplant: 3 × BMW-built Pratt & Whitney Hornet , 386 kW (525 hp) each

Performance

- Maximum speed: 210 km/h (131 mph, 114 kn)
- Cruise speed: 170 km/h (106 mph, 92 kn)
- Range: 850 km (528 mi, 459 nmi)
- Endurance: Five hours
- Service ceiling: 4,400 m (14,400 ft)
- Rate of climb: 3.0 m/s (590 ft/min)

== See also ==
Aircraft of comparable role, configuration, and era

- Armstrong Whitworth Argosy
- Ford Trimotor
- Fokker F.VII

Related lists

- List of aircraft of World War II
