= Junkers A 35 =

1920s monoplane fighter aircraft

A 35
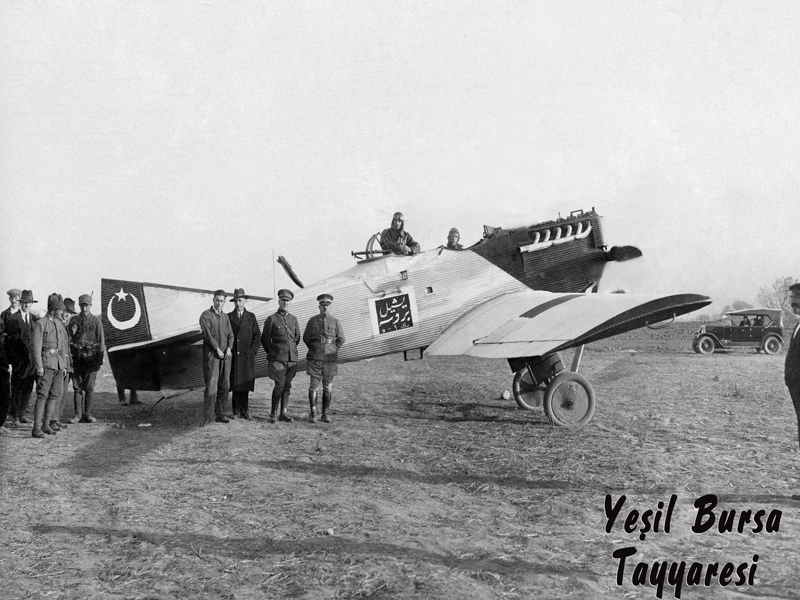
- Junkers A 20 "Yesil Bursa"

General information
- Type: Postal, training and military aircraft
- Manufacturer: Junkers
- Designer: Mader and Zindel
- Primary user: Russian Air Force
- Number built: 186

Junkers A 35 was a two-seater cantilever monoplane, used for postal, training and military purposes. The aircraft was designed in the 1920s by Junkers in Germany and manufactured at Dessau and by AB Flygindustri in Limhamn, Sweden and conversions from A 20s were made in Fili, Russia.

== Design and development ==
The A 35 was a development of a series of Junkers aircraft from 1918, starting with the J10/J11, the A 20, A 25, A 32, and finally the A 35. It was originally intended as a two-seat multi-purpose fighter aircraft and made its first flight in 1926. Due to the post-war restrictions, Hugo Junkers and the Soviet Government signed a contract about the setup of an aircraft facility at Fili in Russia in December 1922.

In 1926, the first Junkers L5 engines were mounted on the Junkers A 20s. With some further tail modifications the new aircraft was designated as A 35. A total of 24 aircraft were originally built as A 35s. A number of A 20s and A 25s were also modified with the Junkers L5 engine. The A 35 was also available with a BMW IV engine.

== Versions ==
Junkers A 20
The version manufactured in Limhamn was called R02 and the version manufactured in Fili was called Ju 20
Junkers A 20L
Landplane version.
Junkers A 20W
Floatplane version.
Junkers A 25
The version manufactured in Limhamn was called R41 and the version manufactured in Fili was called Type A
Junkers A 35
The militarized version manufactured in Limhamn was called K53/R53 and the version manufactured in Fili was called Type 20.

The Junkers R53 was first built as in 1926 as a military version of the Junkers A35. It was equipped with a Junkers L5 engine and a machine gun over the rear seat by AB Flygindustri in Limhamn and this version was designated as the Junkers/AFI R53. It was sold to different countries from Sweden to avoid the restrictions of the Treaty of Versailles. Most of these R53 were converted Junkers A35 or A20 civil aircraft, which had been built at Dessau. Some were delivered to Turkey as modified A20s, a further 20 aircraft went to Russia and 21 militarized R53 were sold to China.

== Operators ==
Afghanistan

- Afghan Air Force

Bulgaria

- Bulgarian Air Force

Chile

- Chilean Air Force

China
21 K53 aircraft were sold to Chinese warlords, 10 to Zhang Zongchang of Shandong, 9 to Zhang Xueliang of Manchuria, 1 to Yan Xishan of Shanxi, 1 sold to Liu Xiang of Sichuan.
Finland

- Finnish Air Force – One aircraft only. Tested for three weeks in 1928.

Germany

- Reichswehr

Hungary

- Royal Hungarian Air Force

Iran

- Imperial Iranian Air Force: Only 1 received in March of 1925.

(Spain) Spanish Republic
Soviet Union

- Soviet Air Force – 20 Ju-20 (militarized A 20) aircraft

Turkey

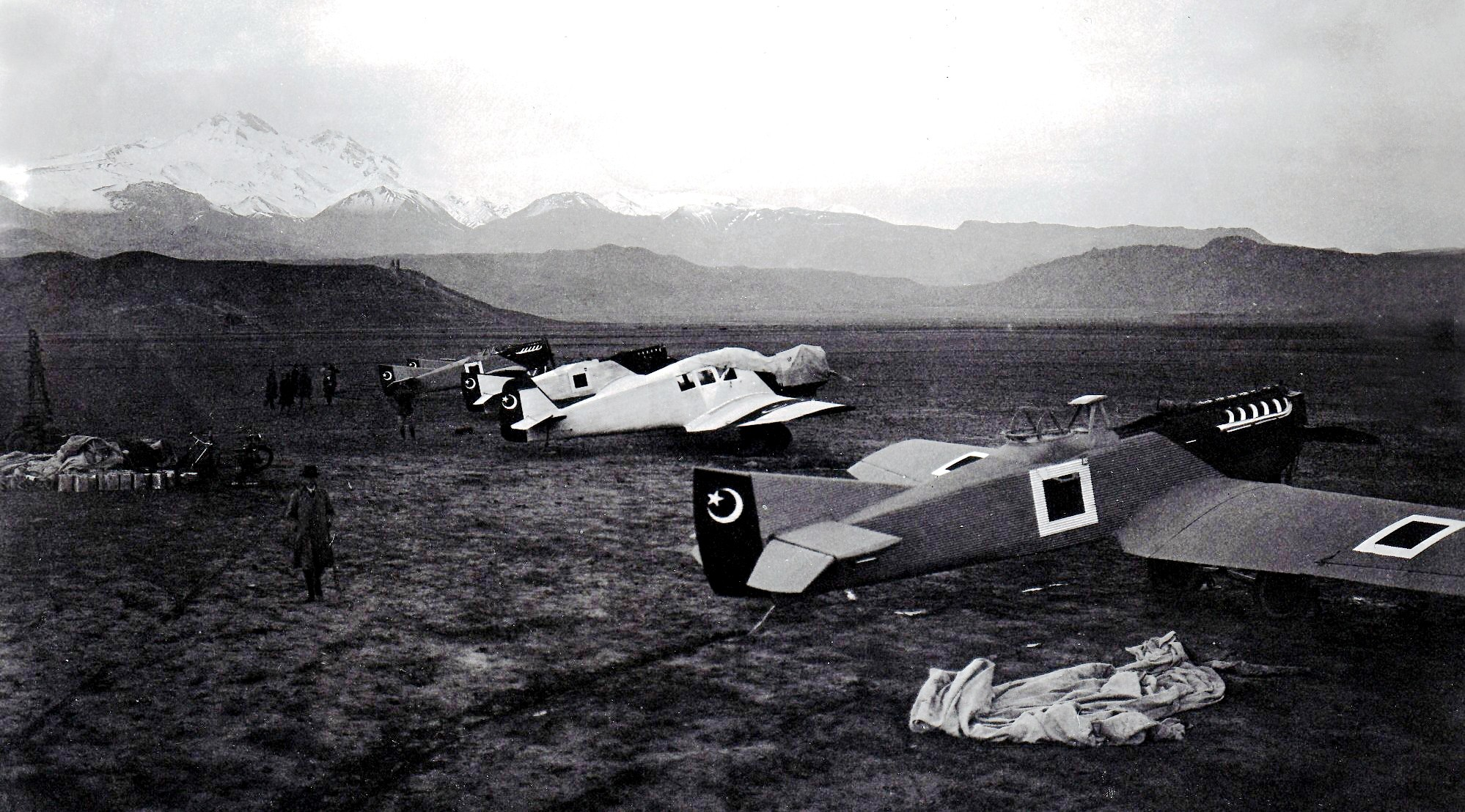
A20 aircraft, produced jointly by the Turkish Government and the Junkers in Turkey, the first delivery of which was made in Kayseri in March 1925

- Turkish Air Force – 64 A20 aircraft, Together with the Turkish Government Junkers set up a factory at Kayseri under the name TOMTAŞ. At this factory the delivered A20 aircraft, modified to A35's, were militarized with machine guns and bomb slots.

== Specifications (A 35) ==
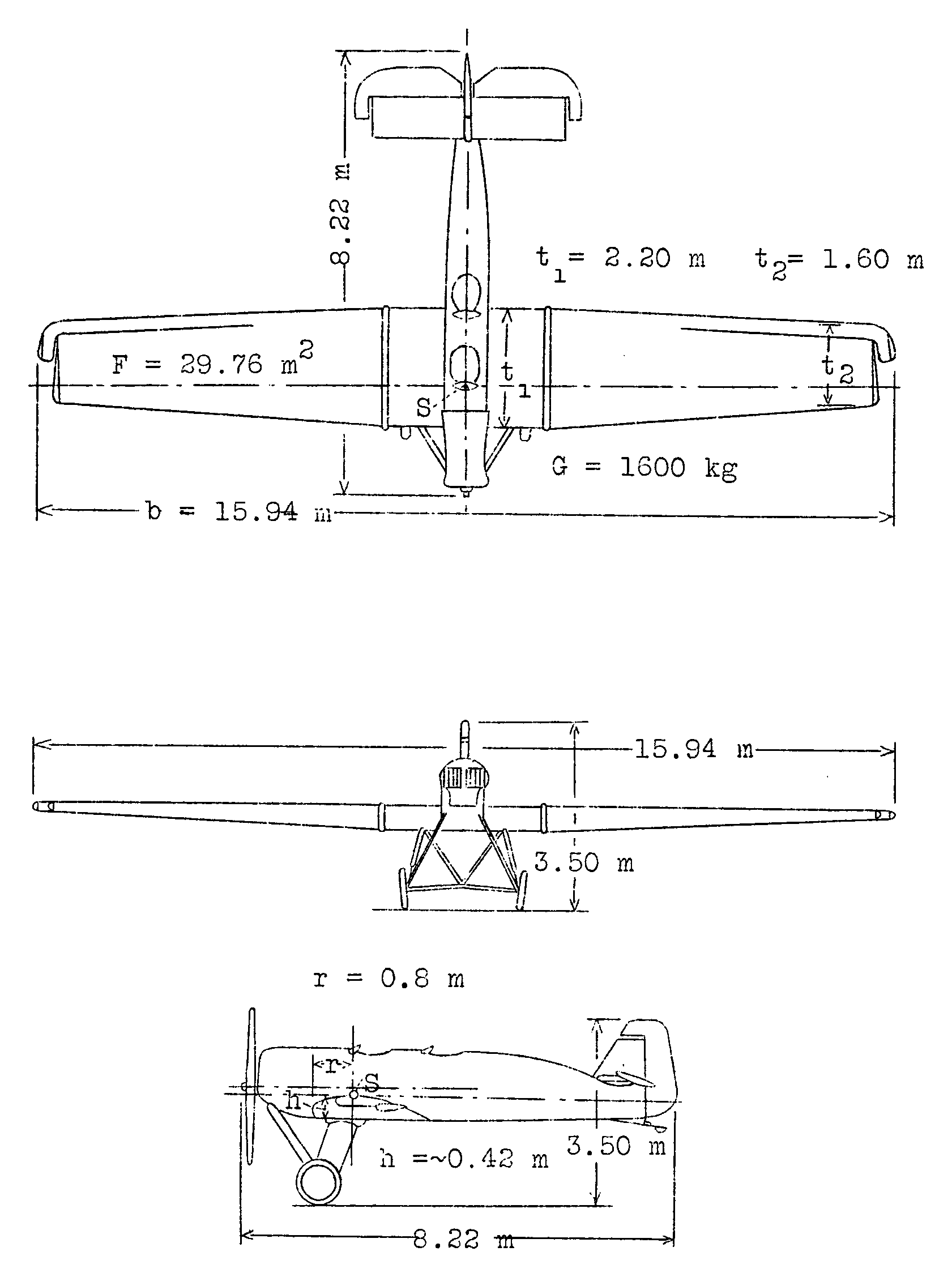
Junkers A 35 3-view drawing from NACA-TM-586

Data from Thulinista Hornetiin

General characteristics

- Crew: 2
- Length: 8.21 m (26 ft 11 in)
- Wingspan: 15.94 m (52 ft 4 in)
- Height: 3.5 m (11 ft 6 in)
- Wing area: 29.8 m^{2} (321 sq ft)
- Empty weight: 1,075 kg (2,370 lb)
- Gross weight: 1,500 kg (3,307 lb)
- Max takeoff weight: 1,600 kg (3,527 lb)
- Powerplant: 1 × Junkers L 5 6-cylinder water-cooled inline piston engine 310 PS (310 hp; 230 kW)
- Propellers: 2-bladed fixed-pitch propeller

Performance

- Maximum speed: 208 km/h (129 mph, 112 kn)
- Cruise speed: 185 km/h (115 mph, 100 kn)
- Service ceiling: 6,400 m (21,000 ft)

Armament

- Guns:

- 2x fixed, forward-firing, synchronised 7.7 mm (0.303 in) Vickers machine guns in the nose
- 2x flexible 7.7 mm (0.303 in) Lewis guns on a Scarff ring in the rear cockpit.

- Bombs:

- Provision for four 50 kg (110 lb) bombs under the wings.

== See also ==
Related lists

- List of military aircraft of Germany

== Bibliography ==
- Andersson, Lennart. "Chinese 'Junks': Junkers Aircraft Exports to China 1925-1940". Air Enthusiast, No. 55, Autumn 1994, pp. 2–7. ISSN 0143-5450
- Andersson, Lennart (1991). "Junker's Two-seaters, Part One". Air Enthusiast. No. 44. pp. 70–77. ISSN 0143-5450.
- Andersson, Lennart (July 1998). "Histoire de l'aéronautique persane, 1921–1941: La première aviation du Chah d'Iran" [History of the Persian Air Force, 1921–1941: The First Aircraft of the Shah of Iran]. Avions: Toute l'aéronautique et son histoire (in French) (76): 2–12. ISSN 1243-8650.
