= Junkers L5 =

German six cylinder engine

L5
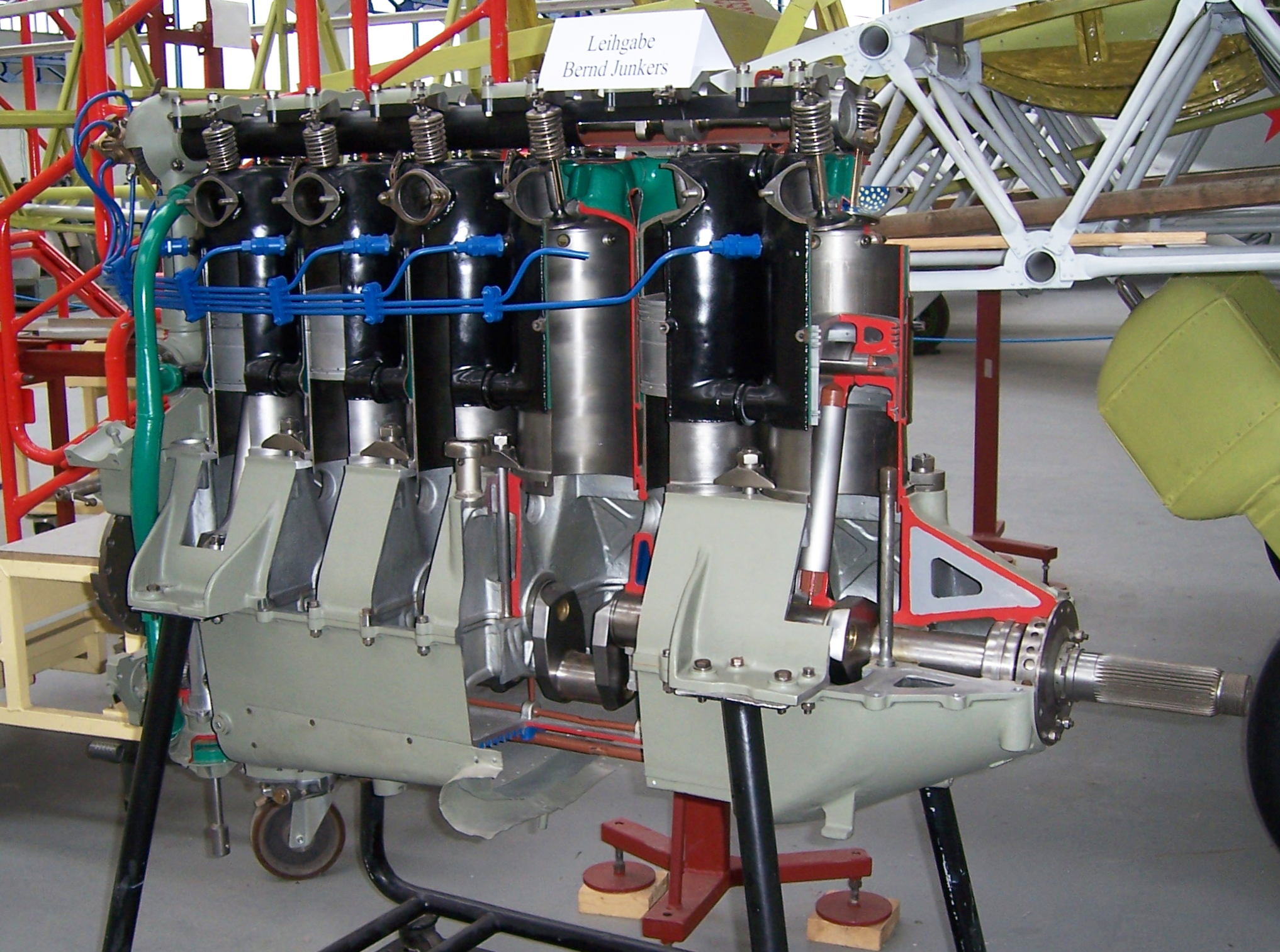
- Junkers L5 on display at the Junkers Museum
- Type: Inline-six aircraft engine
- Manufacturer: Junkers Motorenbau GmbH (Jumo)
- First run: 1922
- Major applications: Junkers F.13
- Number built: >1,000
- Variants: Junkers L55

The Junkers L 5 was a six-cylinder, water-cooled, inline engine for aircraft built in Germany during the 1920s. First run in 1925, it was a much enlarged development of the Junkers L2.

== Design and development ==
The Junkers L5 was a development of Junkers' first water-cooled engine, the L2, but at four times the swept volume was a much more powerful engine. It was a water-cooled upright inline 6-cylinder unit, four-stroke and petrol-fuelled, with a capacity of nearly 23 litres. It adopted some of the L2 features, having twin exhaust and inlet valves in each cylinder driven by an overhead camshaft, twin spark plugs and twin magnetos. The splash component of the L2's lubrication was abandoned in favour of a completely forced recirculating system. The twin carburettors of the L2 were replaced with a single float chamber, dual-venturi model. Like the L2, the L5 was a direct drive engine.

The compression ratio of the standard version was 5.5:1, but variants had other ratios to cope with fuels with octane ratings between 76 and 95. The G series introduced carburettor heating together with an hydraulically damped mounting system. There were also choices of starting system, from inertial or compressed air systems to the traditional hand swinging.

== Operational history ==
The L5 proved to be reliable and became the engine of choice for most Junkers aircraft in the mid-1920s as well as powering aircraft from other German manufacturers. Many of these powered the Junkers F.13 and its derivatives like the W 33, which dominated world air transport in the mid-1920s.

The best demonstration of the reliability of the L5 was given by the unit which powered the single-engined W 33 Bremen in the first fixed wing east to west crossing of the Atlantic in April 1928. For this flight the compression ratio was raised to 7:1 to provide sufficient power for the heavily fuelled aircraft at take off. In July 1925 a W 33 powered by a L5 stayed aloft for 65 h 25 min, with a fuel consumption of 35.6 kg/h.

== Variants ==
- L5 many variants including a variety of compression ratios, power output levels and starting systems.
- L55 an upright V-12 built from two L5s on a common crankshaft.
- L8 a significant 1929 development with the same swept volume but cruising at 2,100 rpm and delivering 354 hp; take off power was 413 hp. The output was geared down at ratios between 2.47:1 and 1.44:1 to enhance propeller efficiency. Only a few were produced, powering early configurations of the Junkers G 38 as outer engines, with two L55s inboard.
- L88 an upright V-12 built from two L8s on a common crankshaft.

== Applications (L5) ==
- Albatros L 73
- Albatros L 75
- Albatros L 83 Adler
- Focke-Wulf A 32
- Heinkel HD 42
- Heinkel He 50
- Junkers F 13
- Junkers A 20
- Junkers A 35
- Junkers G 23
- Junkers G 24
- Junkers K 30
- Junkers G 31
- Junkers W 33
- Messerschmitt M 24
- Rohrbach Ro.VIII

== Specifications (Jumo L 5) ==
Junkers L8 engine on display at the Polish Aviation Museum

Data from

=== General characteristics ===
- Type: 6-cylinder liquid-cooled inline
- Bore: 160 mm (6.3 in)
- Stroke: 190 mm (7.5 in)
- Displacement: 22.92 L (1,399 cu in)
- Length: 1,750 mm (69 in)
- Width: 650 mm (26 in)
- Height: 1,265 mm (49.8 in)
- Dry weight: 334 kg (736 lb) dry

=== Components ===
- Valvetrain: Single exhaust and single inlet valves driven by a single overhead camshaft shaft and gear driven from the crankshaft
- Fuel system: Single float, dual venturi carburettor; twin plugs per cylinder, twin magnetos
- Fuel type: 95 octane (dependent on compression ratio)
- Oil system: forced
- Cooling system: liquid

=== Performance ===
- Power output: Take-off - 260 kW (350 hp) at 1,450 rpm

Cruise - 210 kW (280 hp)

- Compression ratio: 7:1
- Fuel consumption: 61.6 kg/h (136 lb/hr)
- Power-to-weight ratio: 0.78 kW/kg (0.47 hp/lb)

== See also ==
Related lists

- List of aircraft engines

== Bibliography ==
- Gunston, Bill (2006). World Encyclopedia of Aero Engines: From the Pioneers to the Present Day (5th ed.). Stroud, UK: Sutton. ISBN 0-7509-4479-X.
- Kay, Antony (2004). Junkers Aircraft & Engines 1913–1945. London: Putnam Aeronautical Books. ISBN 0-85177-985-9.
