= Junkers G.38 =

Transport aircraft in Nazi Germany

G.38
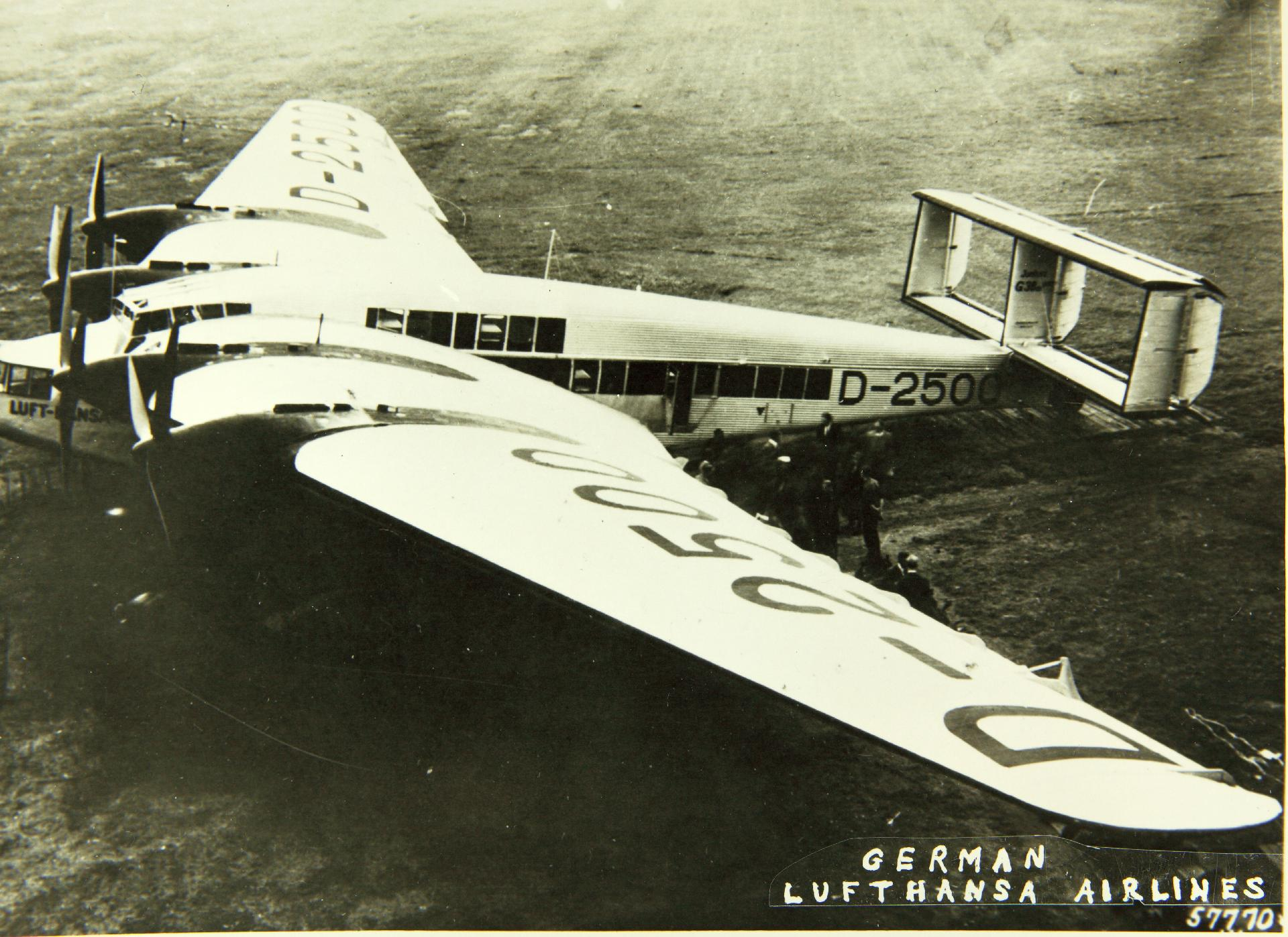

General information
- Type: Transport
- Manufacturer: Junkers
- Primary users: Deutsche Luft Hansa Luftwaffe
- Number built: 2

History
- First flight: 6 November 1929
- Variant: Mitsubishi Ki-20

The Junkers G.38 was a large German four-engine transport aircraft that first flew in 1929. Two examples were constructed in Germany. Both aircraft flew as commercial transports within Europe in the years leading up to World War II.

During the 1930s, the design was licensed to Mitsubishi, which constructed and flew a total of six aircraft, in a military bomber/transport configuration, designated Ki-20.

The G.38 carried a crew of seven. Onboard mechanics were able to service the engines in flight due to the G.38's thick wing, which provided access to all four power plants.

== Design and development ==
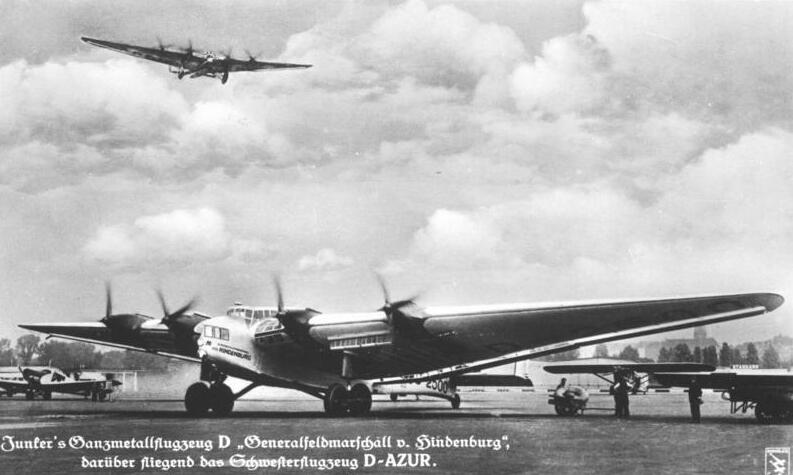
The second G.38 on the ground as the first aircraft flies overhead

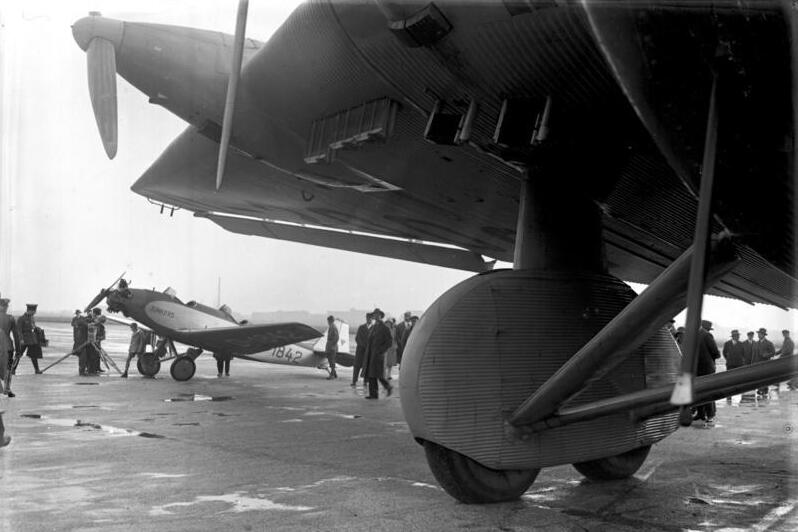
First G.38 at Berlin Tempelhof Airport showing spatted tandem main wheels, the aileron section of the "double wing" and—most unusually—retractable oil and water radiators under the wing in their extended positions

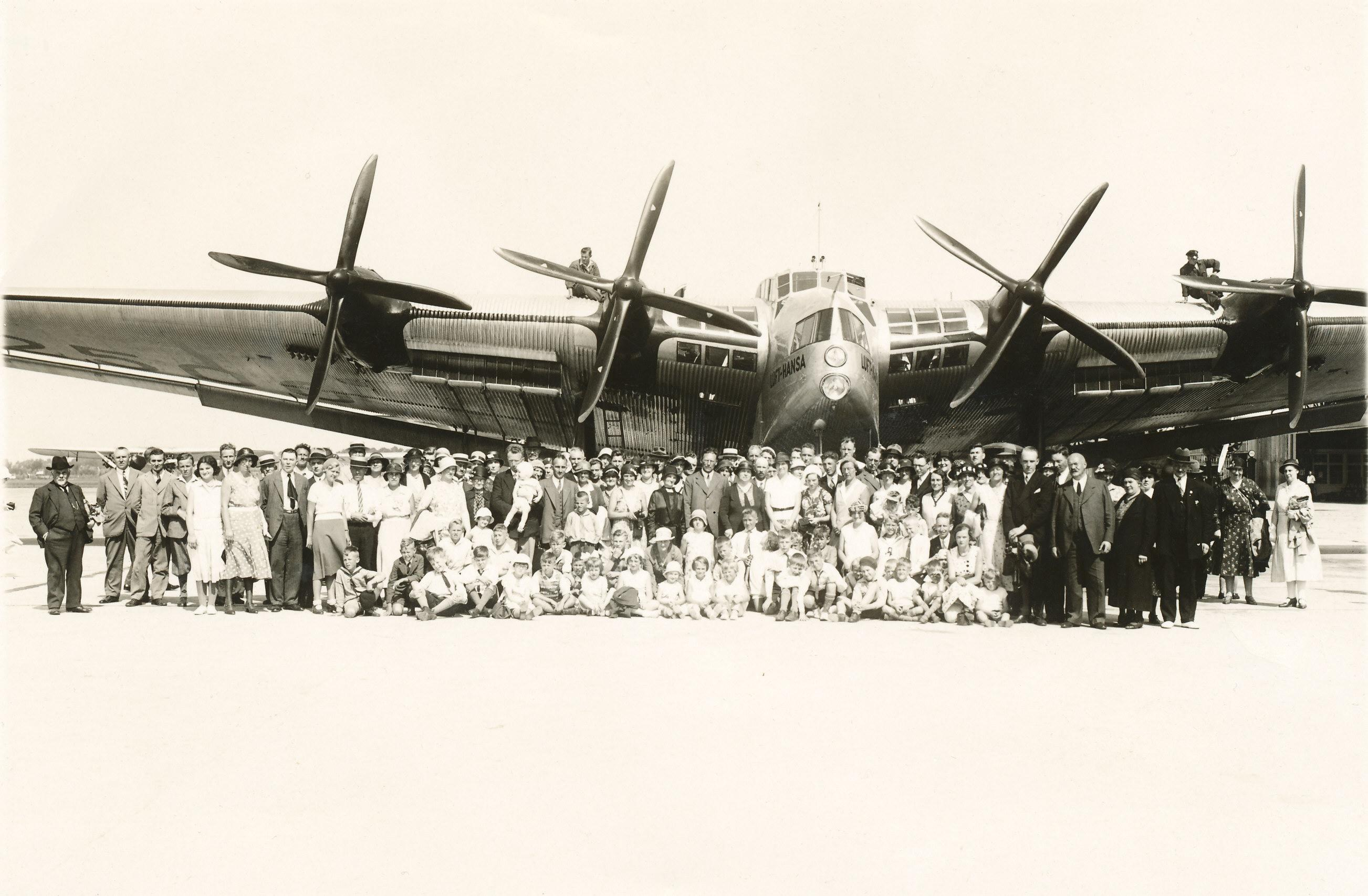
Second G.38 at Amsterdam’s Schiphol airport, showing the windows of the wing cabins

During the 1920s, Hugo Junkers made several attempts to produce a large scale commercial transport. His initial attempt, the four-engined JG1, was developed during 1921-1922; but Junkers was forced to destroy the incomplete airplane based on post-World War I Allied demands citing the Treaty of Versailles. Later in the decade, in 1925, he published design specifications for a proposed eighty passenger trans-Atlantic aircraft - the J.1000 project. Then again, towards the end of the decade, the G.40 project was started by the Junkers design team as a trans-Atlantic mail plane. From the G.40 design, which was a flying boat configuration, Junkers also developed a landplane design, designated the G.38. Despite interest from the German armed forces in the G.40 variant, Junkers pushed forward with the landplane design, which, having received financing from the Reichsluftfahrtministerium (Reich Air Ministry), was taken forward to the construction stage.

Structurally the G.38 followed standard Junkers design practices, with a cantilever multi-tubular-spar wing covered (like the rest of the aircraft) in corrugated duraluminium. The biplane tail, found in other large aircraft of the time, was intended to reduce rudder forces; initially there were three rudders with only a central fixed fin. The undercarriage was fixed, with double tandem main wheels that were initially enclosed in very large spats. The wing had the usual Junkers "double wing" form, the name referring to the full span flaps which served also as ailerons in their outer segments.

The first aircraft—serial number 3301 and registered as D-2000—first flew on 6 November 1929 with four gasoline engines of two different sizes: two Junkers L55 V-12 engines and two 294 kW (394 hp) L8 six-cylinder inline engines, with a total power rating of 1,470 kW (1,970 hp). The Reich Air Ministry purchased D-2000 for demonstration flights, and took delivery on 27 March 1930. In flight tests, the G.38 set four world records including speed, distance and duration for airplanes lifting a 5,000 kg (11,000 lb) payload. On 2 May 1930 Deutsche Luft Hansa put the aircraft into commercial service for scheduled and chartered flights.

Passenger accommodation was sumptuous by today's standards and was meant to rival that found on the competing Zeppelin service offered by DELAG. The design was unusual in that passengers were seated in the wings, which were 1.7 m (5 ft 7 in) thick at the root. There were also two seats in the extreme nose. The leading edge of each wing was fitted with sloping windscreens, giving these passengers a forward-facing view usually available only to pilots. There were three 11-seat cabins, plus smoking cabins and washrooms.

== Operational history ==
On 2 February 1931 the Junkers facility at Leipzig refitted D-2000 with two Junkers L8 and two L88 engines, giving a total power rating of 1764 kW (2366 hp) and increasing passenger capacity from 13 to 19. On 1 July 1931 Luft Hansa initiated regularly scheduled service between Berlin and London on flights carrying up to 13 passengers. This London-Berlin service was halted in October 1931 to retrofit the aircraft and expand its passenger cabin. Modifications lasted from this time until mid-1932, during which a second deck was built within D-2000's fuselage—enabling an increased cargo capacity and seating for up to 30 passengers. Additionally the aircraft's engines were again upgraded – to four L88s, giving a total power of 2352 kW (3154 hp). Also at this time D-2000's registration was changed to D-AZUR.

Meanwhile, a second G.38—serial number 3302 and registration D-2500, later changed to D-APIS, was built with a double deck fuselage and capacity for 34 passengers. Six passengers were carried in the wing leading edges in cabins between the fuselage and the inner engines, the others were seated on two levels in the fuselage. Deutsche Luft Hansa used D-APIS on a scheduled service covering the cities Berlin, Hanover, Amsterdam, and London. This aircraft was named General Feldmarschall von Hindenburg.

In 1934 D-AZUR had its engines upgraded, this time with Jumo 4 engines, giving a total power rating of 2208 kW (2960 hp).

Both aircraft were in service simultaneously until 1936, when D-AZUR crashed at Dessau during a post-maintenance test flight. Deutsche Luft Hansa had to write the aircraft off due to the extensive damage, but test pilot Wilhelm Zimmermann survived the crash and there were no other casualties.

The second G.38 flew successfully within the Deutsche Luft Hansa fleet for nearly a decade. With the outbreak of World War II D-APIS was pressed into military service as a transport by the Luftwaffe. It was destroyed on the ground during the German invasion of Greece, in a Royal Air Force air raid on Athens on 17 May 1941.

== Specifications (G.38 1929) ==
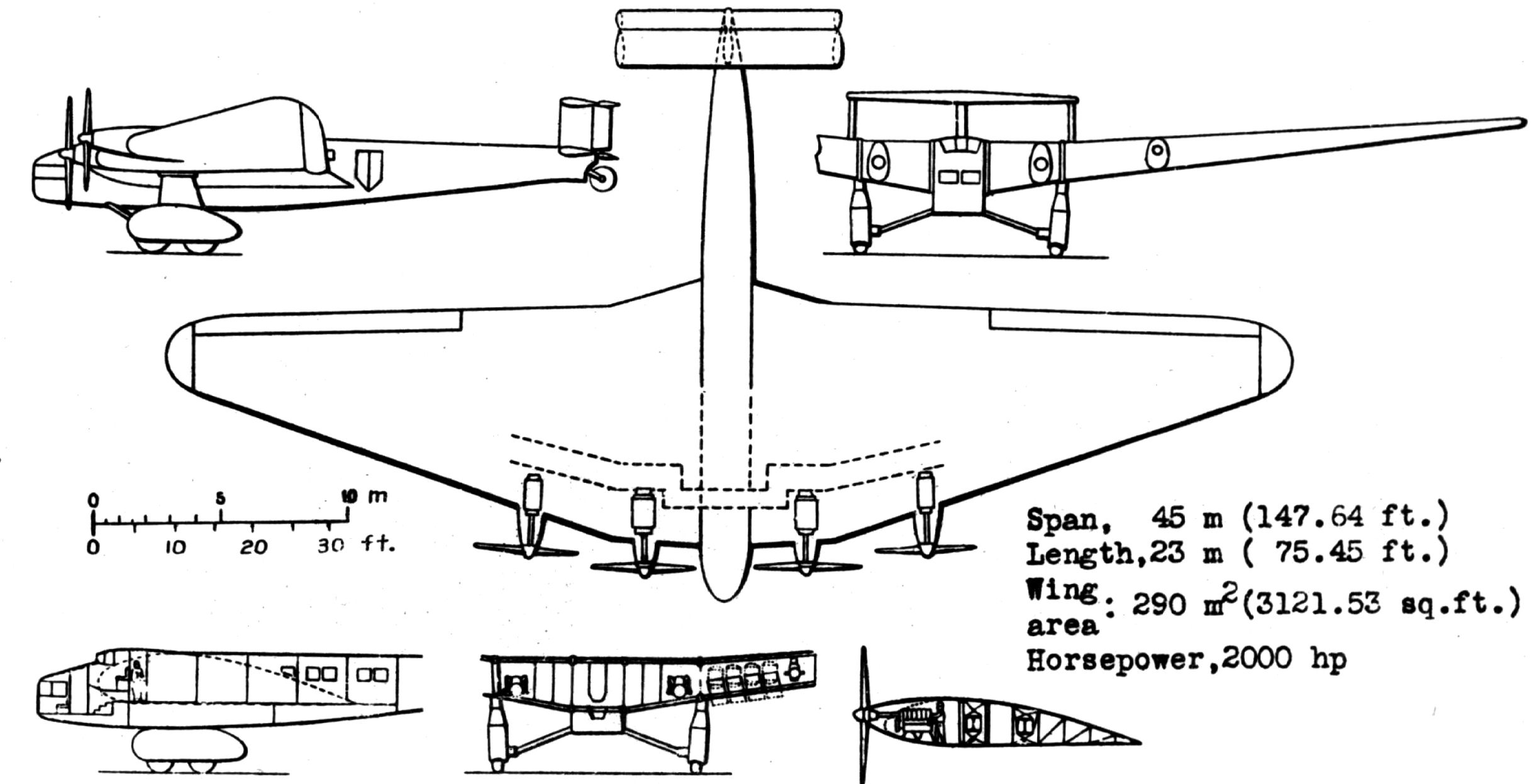
Junkers G.38 3-view drawing from NACA Aircraft Circular No.116

General characteristics

- Crew: 7
- Capacity: 30 (D-2000/D-AZUR) and 34 (D-2500/D-APIS) passengers
- Length: 23.21 m (76 ft 2 in)
- Wingspan: 44 m (144 ft 4 in)
- Height: 7.2 m (23 ft 7 in)
- Wing area: 290 m^{2} (3,100 sq ft)
- Empty weight: 14,920 kg (32,893 lb)
- Gross weight: 24,000 kg (52,911 lb)
- Max takeoff weight: 21,240 kg (46,826 lb)
- Powerplant: 2 × Junkers L88 V12 water-cooled gasoline piston engines, 588 kW (789 hp) each inboard
- Powerplant: 2 × Junkers L8a six-cylinder, water-cooled, in-line gasoline piston engines, 308 kW (413 hp) each at take-off, outboard
- Propellers: 2-bladed wooden fixed pitch propellers outboard, 4-bladed wooden fixed pitch propellers inboard

Performance

- Maximum speed: 225 km/h (140 mph, 121 kn)
- Cruise speed: 175 km/h (109 mph, 94 kn)
- Range: 3,460 km (2,150 mi, 1,870 nmi)
- Service ceiling: 3,690 m (12,110 ft)

== Operators ==
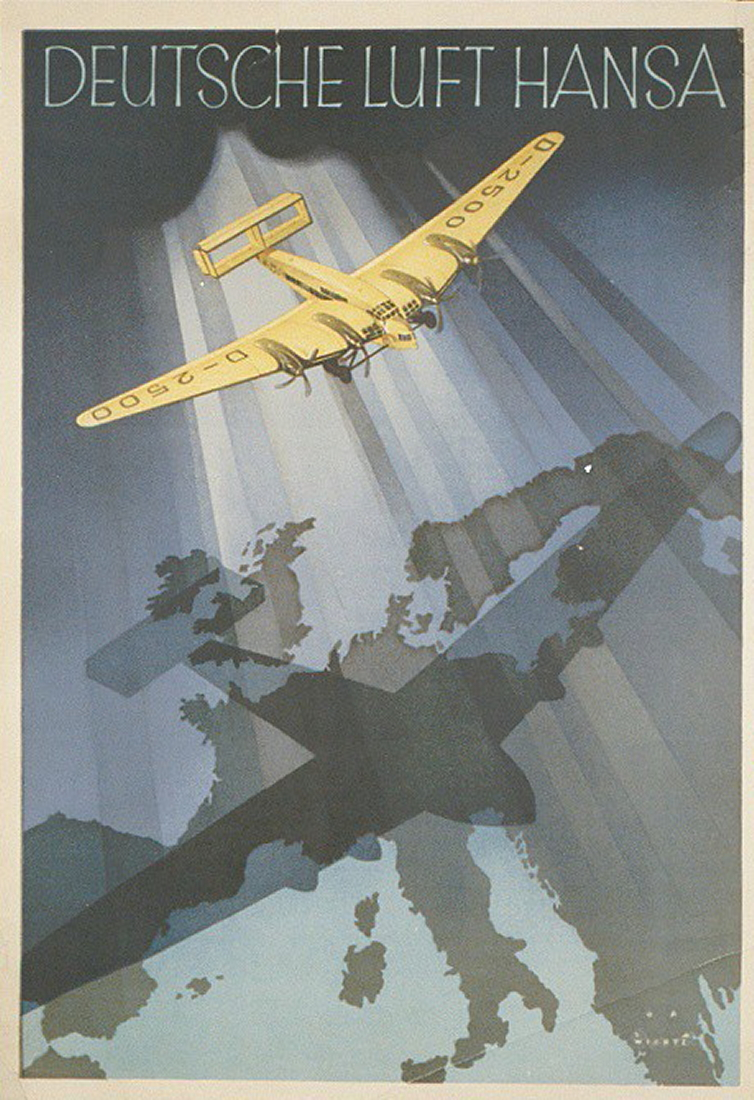
Deutsche Luft Hansa advertising poster featuring D-2500

- Weimar Republic
  - Deutsche Luft Hansa
- Nazi Germany
  - Luftwaffe

== In popular culture ==
The G.38 was featured in the 2013 semi-fictional movie The Wind Rises by Japanese director Hayao Miyazaki, as was Hugo Junkers.

== See also ==
- Junkers
- List of RLM aircraft designations

Related development

- Mitsubishi Ki-20

Aircraft of comparable role, configuration, and era

- Tupolev ANT-20
- Burnelli CBY-3
