= Mitsubishi Ki-20 =

Japanese bomber aircraft

Ki-20
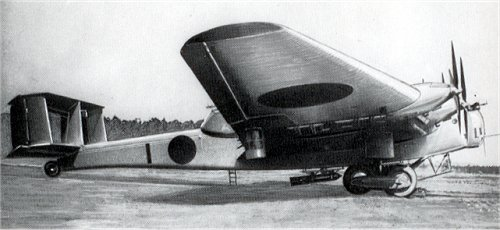
- The Mitsubishi Ki-20

General information
- Type: Bomber
- Manufacturer: Mitsubishi Aircraft Company
- Primary user: Imperial Japanese Army Air Service
- Number built: 6

History
- Manufactured: 1931-1935
- First flight: 1932
- Developed from: Junkers G.38

The Mitsubishi Ki-20 is a Japanese bomber variant of the Junkers G.38 airliner. Mitsubishi manufactured six aircraft under license from Junkers. These aircraft, designated Army Type 92 Heavy Bomber, served through the 1930s. During World War II, the Ki-20 served in a variety of transport and support roles.

== Design and development ==
In the late-1920s, as Junkers developed the Junkers G.38, Mitsubishi representatives in Germany expressed an interest in a military version of this civilian transport. At the time, the G.38 was the largest landplane in the world. Junkers completed a design study for a military bomber/transport, based on the G.38, designated the K.51. This design was not accepted by the Reichsluftfahrtministerium.

The K.51 design study was of interest to Japan. A licensing and manufacturing agreement was reached and in 1932, the first two Ki-20s were completed by Mitsubishi, utilizing Junkers-made parts. A prototype was successfully flown in Japan by a German test pilot in that year.

Four additional Ki-20s were built between 1933 and 1935. All of these subsequent models used Mitsubishi-built parts. Ongoing development focused on engine upgrades to all examples to address the persistent issue of the aircraft being underpowered. Several engine upgrades were completed during the lifetime of these aircraft. The initial Junkers L88 engines were replaced by the more powerful Jumo 204 engines, also built under license by Mitsubishi. Additionally, Kawasaki Ha-9 engines were utilized for testing purposes.

== Operational history ==
During World War II, the Japanese originally intended to utilize the Ki-20s to attack the forts at the entrance to Manila Bay in the Philippines, as well as for deep penetration missions into Siberia. For these purposes, they were armed with six gun positions and structurally enabled to carry a 5,000 kg (11,000 lb) bomb load. These aircraft were the largest operated by the Imperial Japanese Army Air Service and their existence within it was kept secret. As a result, they were issued their out-of-sequence Kitai number '20' only when they were finally revealed in 1940.

== Surviving aircraft ==
A single example survived to the end of hostilities as a museum piece in the Tokorozawa Aviation Memorial Hall. All examples of this aircraft were either destroyed during the war or broken up for scrap during the latter portion of the 1940s.

== Specifications ==
Data from Japanese Aircraft, 1910-1941

General characteristics

- Crew: 10
- Length: 23.2 m (76 ft 1 in)
- Wingspan: 44 m (144 ft 4 in)
- Height: 7 m (23 ft 0 in)
- Wing area: 294 m^{2} (3,160 sq ft)
- Empty weight: 14,912 kg (32,875 lb)
- Gross weight: 25,448 kg (56,103 lb)
- Powerplant: 4 × Junkers Jumo 204 (Type Ju) 6-cylinder liquid-cooled opposed-piston diesel engines, 560 kW (750 hp) each
- Propellers: 4-bladed wooden fixed-pitch propellers

Performance

- Maximum speed: 200 km/h (120 mph, 110 kn)
- Wing loading: 86.6 kg/m^{2} (17.7 lb/sq ft)
- Power/mass: 0.094 kW/kg (0.057 hp/lb)

Armament

- Guns:
  - 2 × 7.7 mm (0.303 in) machine guns in nose
  - 1 × 20 mm (0.787 in) cannon on dorsal position
  - 2 × 7.7 mm (0.303 in) machine guns in each of two upper wing turrets
  - 1 × 7.7 mm (0.303 in) machine gun in each of one lower wing turret
- Bombs:
  - Up to 5,000 kg (11,000 lb) bombs carried externally

== See also ==
Related development

- Junkers G.38

Related lists

- List of military aircraft of Japan
