= Junkers Ju 52 =

German transport aircraft

Ju 52
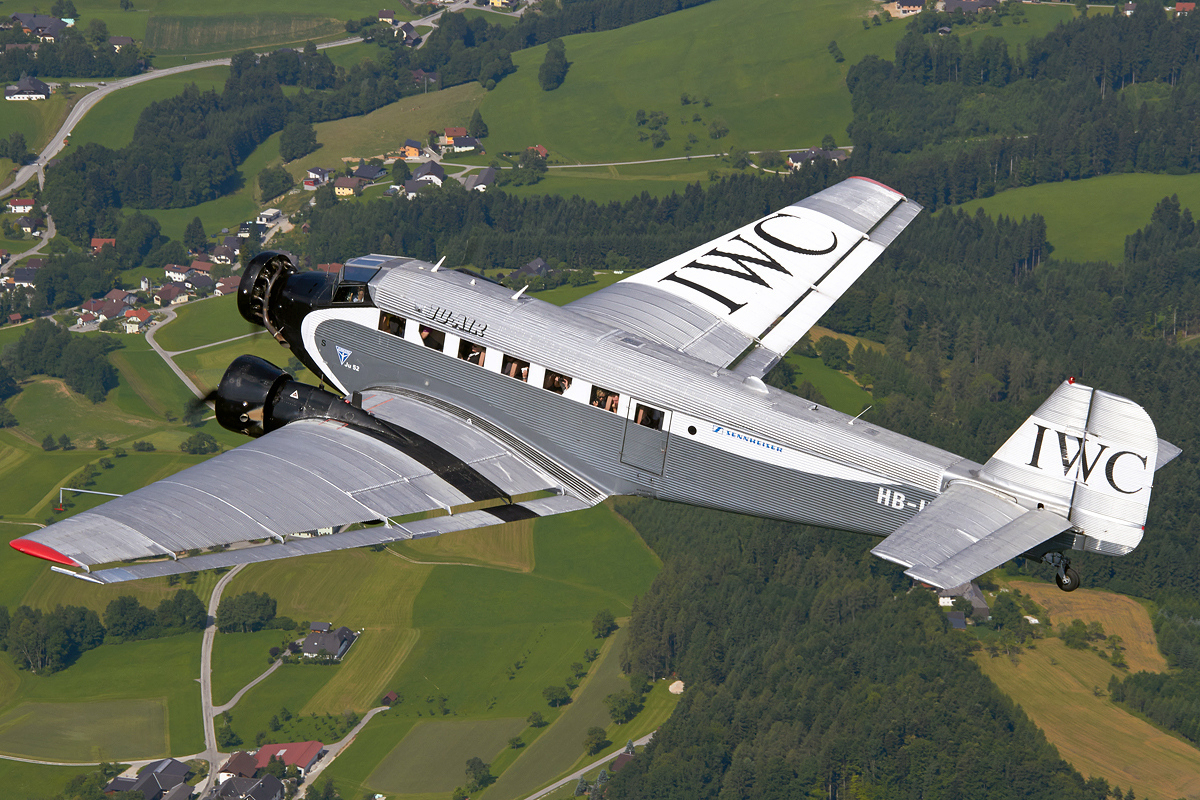
- JU Air Junkers Ju 52/3m HB/HOS in flight over Austria (July 2013)

General information
- Type: Transport aircraft, medium bomber, airliner
- Manufacturer: Junkers
- Designer: Ernst Zindel
- Status: In limited use
- Primary users: Luftwaffe Luft Hansa; Spanish Air Force; French Air Force
- Number built: 4,845

History
- Manufactured: 1931–1945 (Germany); 1945–1947 (France); 1945–1952 (Spain)
- First flight: 13 October 1930 (Ju 52/1m); 7 March 1932 (Ju 52/3m)

The Junkers Ju 52, best known in its Ju 52/3m form (nicknamed Tante Ju ("Aunt Junkers") and Iron Annie) is a transport aircraft that was designed and manufactured by German aviation company Junkers. First introduced in 1930 as a civilian airliner, it was adapted into a military transport aircraft by Nazi Germany.

Development of the Ju 52 commenced in the late 1920s, headed by German aeronautical engineer Ernst Zindel. The aircraft's design incorporated a corrugated duralumin metal skin as a strengthening measure, which was a material design pioneered by Junkers and used on many of their aircraft, including the popular Junkers F 13 1920s, the record-setting Junkers W 33, and Junkers W34. The corrugation was both a strength and a weakness; it provided increased structural strength but also increased aerodynamic drag. But more importantly it allowed the practical use of aluminum before newer alloys were developed.

The Ju 52's maiden flight was performed on 13 October 1930. It was initially designed with a single-engine version and a trimotor version; the single-engine version was to be the freighter while the trimotor was the passenger airliner. In the long run, the trimotor configuration was produced in far greater numbers. The primary early production model, the Ju 52/3m, was principally operated as a 17-seat airliner or utility transport aircraft by various civil operators during the 1930s. Starting in 1933, the Third Reich that had taken power in Germany demanded that Junkers produce military versions of the Ju 52. Thousands of Ju 52s were procured as a staple military transport of the Luftwaffe. The Ju 52/3mg7e was the principal production model.

The Ju 52 was in production between 1931 and 1952. In a civilian role, it flew with over 12 airlines, including Swissair and Deutsche Luft Hansa, as both a passenger carrier and a freight hauler. In a military role, large numbers flew with the Luftwaffe, being deployed on virtually all fronts of the Second World War as a troop and cargo transport; it was also briefly used as a medium bomber. Additionally, the type was deployed by other nations' militaries in conflicts such as the Spanish Civil War, the Chaco War, the First Indochina War, and the Portuguese Colonial War. During the postwar era, the Ju 52 had a lengthy service life with numerous military and civilian operators; large numbers were still in use by the 1980s. Even in the 21st century, several aircraft have remained operational, typically used for heritage aviation displays and aerial sightseeing.

== Development ==
=== Origins ===
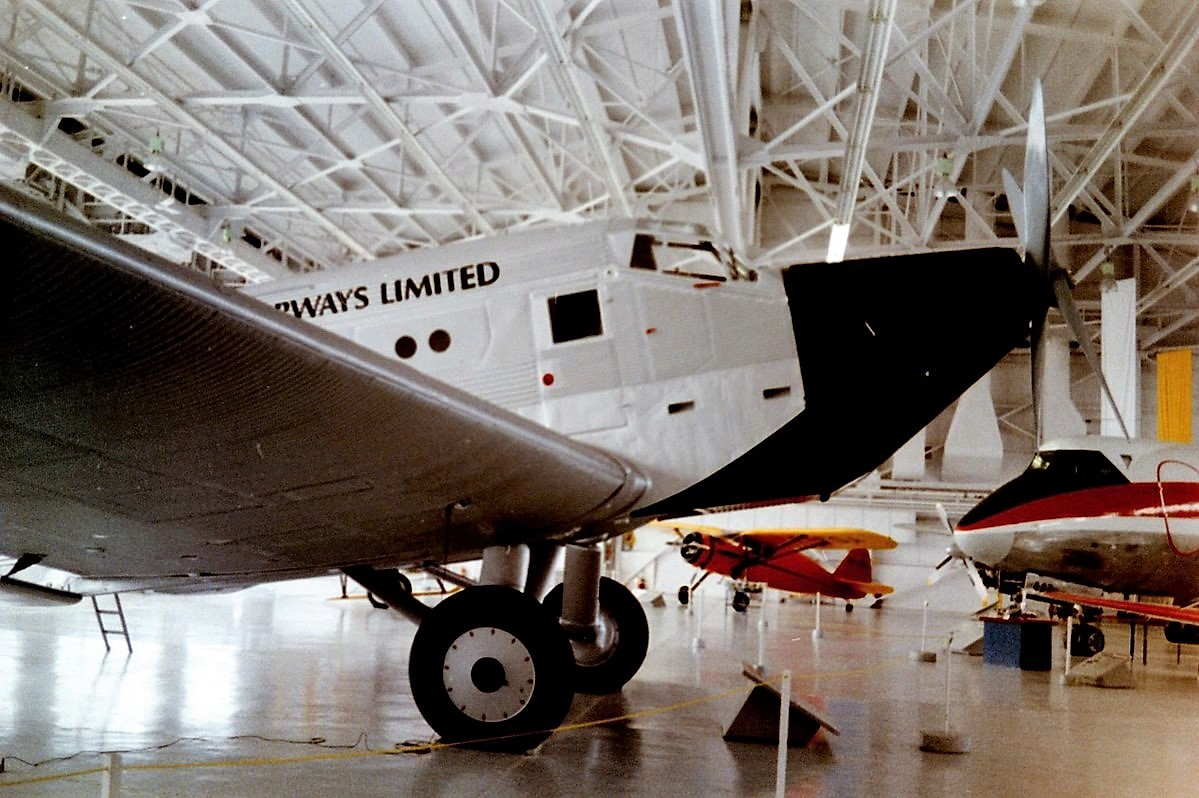
An early version had one engine, and the three engine version was also developed. Trimotors were popular in the 1920s including models from Fokker and Ford (see Fokker Trimotor, Ford Trimotor).

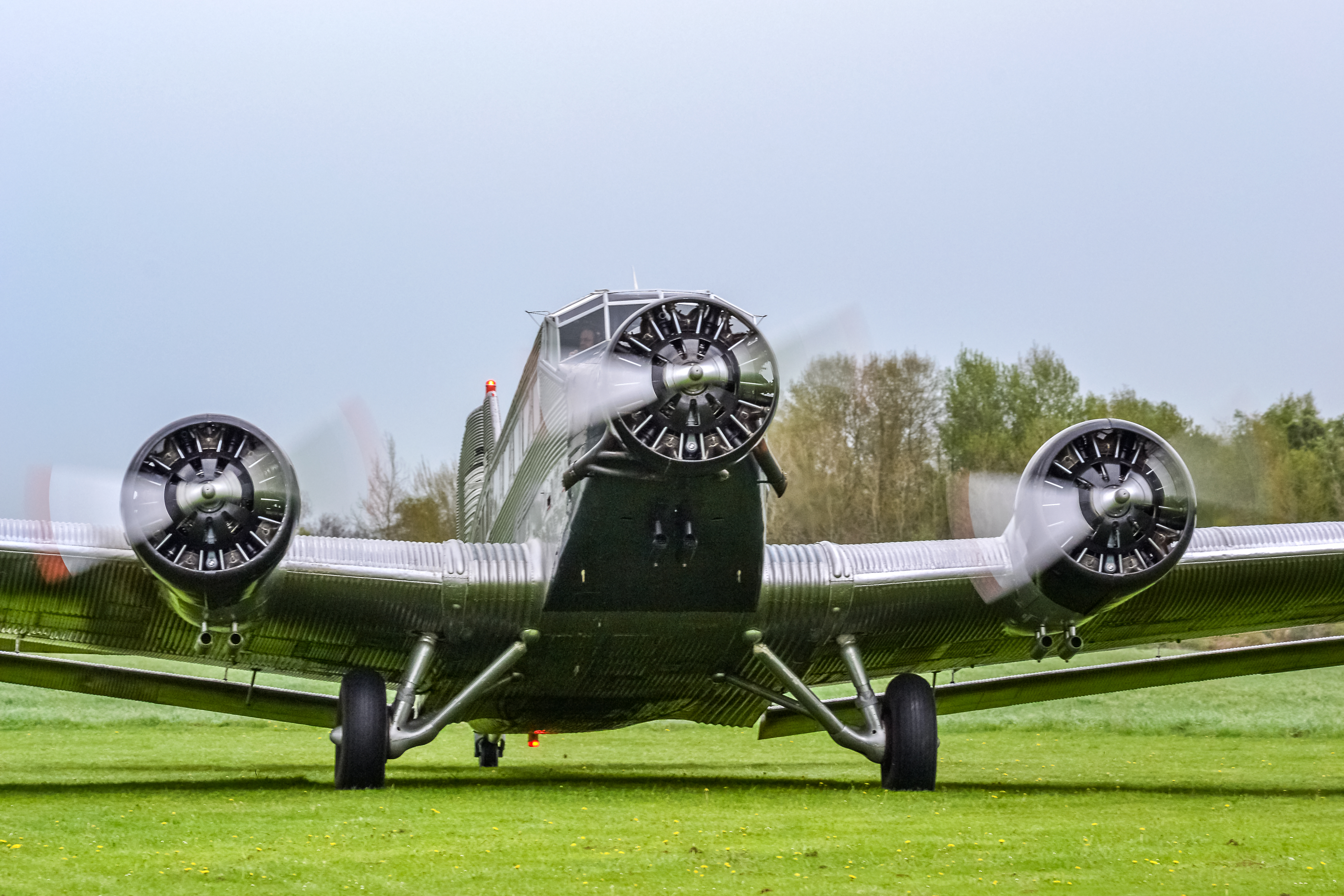
The more familiar three radial engine configuration

The Ju 52 was designed starting in 1925, in two versions, a single engine version for freight transport (Ju-52/1m) and trimotor passenger version for 17 (Ju 52/3m), both as civilian versions. Both designs were overseen by the German aeronautical engineer Ernst Zindel, the design team being based at the Junkers works at Dessau. A driving force in the project was the commercial prospects presented by the German airline Deutsche Luft Hansa. Work on turning the design into a prototype started in 1928. The Ju 52 had numerous similarities to several previous Junkers aircraft, such as the previous Junkers W 33, noted for its crossing of the Atlantic in 1928, and the smaller Junkers W 34. Sharing features included the distinctive corrugated duraluminum exterior. According to aviation author J. Richard Smith, the Ju 52 directly drew upon the company's First World War-era Junkers J 1 - the world's first all-metal aeroplane.

On 13 October 1930, the first prototype, designated Ju 52ba, performed the type's maiden flight; it was initially powered by a single Junkers-built liquid-cooled V-12 engine, capable of generating up to 590 kW (800 PS). During the aircraft's extensive trials, it was reengined with a 555 kW (755 PS) BMW IV water-cooled inline-6 powerplant. The second prototype, designated Ju 52de, featured an increased wing span and was powered by the BMW IV engine at first; it was soon reengined with the 560 kW (750 hp) 14-cylinder twin-row air-cooled radial Armstrong Siddeley Leopard and re-designated Ju 52di. Later on, the Ju 52di was again reengined with the 550 kW (750 PS) Junkers Jumo 204 air-cooled inverted inline-6, after which it was re-designated Ju 52do. The third prototype, designated Ju 52ce, had a strengthened structure, a modified leading edge, and was fitted with both a wheeled and float undercarriages.

During May 1931, one of the prototypes, designated Ju 52cai, was written off after a crash. While these initial aircraft had been powered by a single engine, Junkers decided to develop the Ju 52 into a trimotor configuration. Accordingly, the Ju 52/3m (drei motoren—"three engines") was developed, being powered by an arrangement of three radial engines. According to Smith, the earliest known Ju 52/3m was delivered to Bolivian airline Lloyd Aéreo Boliviano during 1932. During its initial production years, airlines were the type's most common customers. By the mid-1930s, the Ju 52/3mce and Ju 52/3fe, were the two primary production variants, both being powered by the BMW 132 radial engine.

=== Militarized versions ===
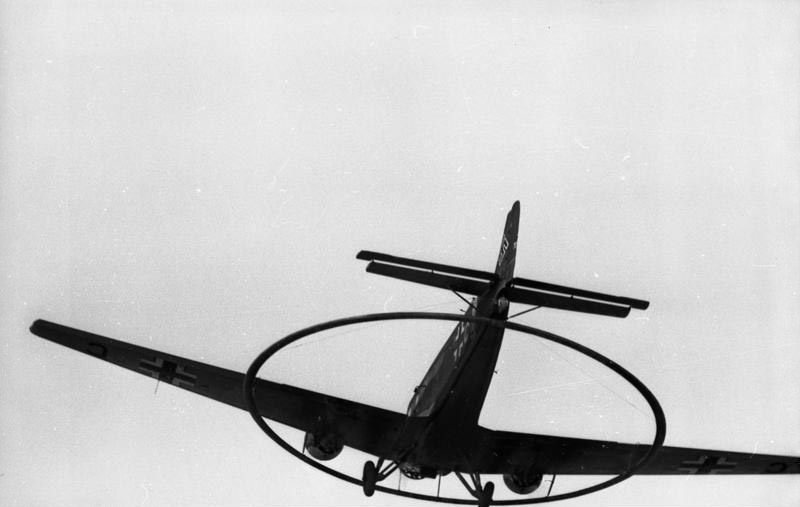
One of the many unique military variants; here is a minesweeping version (note ring), 1942.

During 1934, work commenced on a militarised model of the Ju 52/3m, designated Ju 52/3mg3e, on behalf of the then-secret Luftwaffe. This model could function as a medium bomber, being furnished with a pair of machine gun positions (an open dorsal position and a ventral "dustbin" position lowered by a hand crank), each with single machine guns and operated by a crew of four. Between 1934 and 1935, a total of 450 Ju 52/3mg3e aircraft were delivered to the Luftwaffe.

=== Wartime and postwar ===
Numerous improved models would be introduced prior to and during the Second World War. The dominant production model was the Ju 52/3mg7e, featuring advances such as an autopilot, enlarged doors to the cabin, and other general enhancements. It was configured as a pure transport aircraft, being capable of carrying up to 18 fully-equipped troops. Defensive armaments comprised a dorsal-mounted 13 mm MG 131 machine gun and a pair of beam 7.9mm MG 15 machine guns. Successive models saw other improvements, such as revised glazing, newer engines, undercarriage strengthening, and increased take-off weight. The final wartime model to be developed, designated Ju 52/3mg14e, featured improved armour protection for the pilot and a bolstered defensive armament.

From mid-1943 onwards, the Luftwaffe began to make less use of the Ju 52, interest having waned in the type. German officials were interested in procuring a successor to the type; at one stage, the Reich Air Ministry showed enthusiasm for the Junkers Ju 352, a larger transport aircraft somewhat resembling the Ju 52. Actions were taken to convert Junkers' Ju 52 production lines to instead manufacture Ju 352s; however, the conflict's end in May 1945 led to the effort being abandoned in an unfinished state. As such, German production of the Ju 52 was terminated during 1944; Smith claims that a total of 3,234 aircraft of various models were constructed during the conflict.

In the postwar era, manufacture of the Ju 52 resumed, albeit in foreign countries. It was constructed in France by Avions Amiot as the Amiot AAC.1 Toucan; it was also produced in Spain by Construcciones Aeronáuticas SA (CASA) as the CASA 352. A handful of captured wartime aircraft were also rebuilt by Short Brothers of Northern Ireland for civilian service.

== Design ==
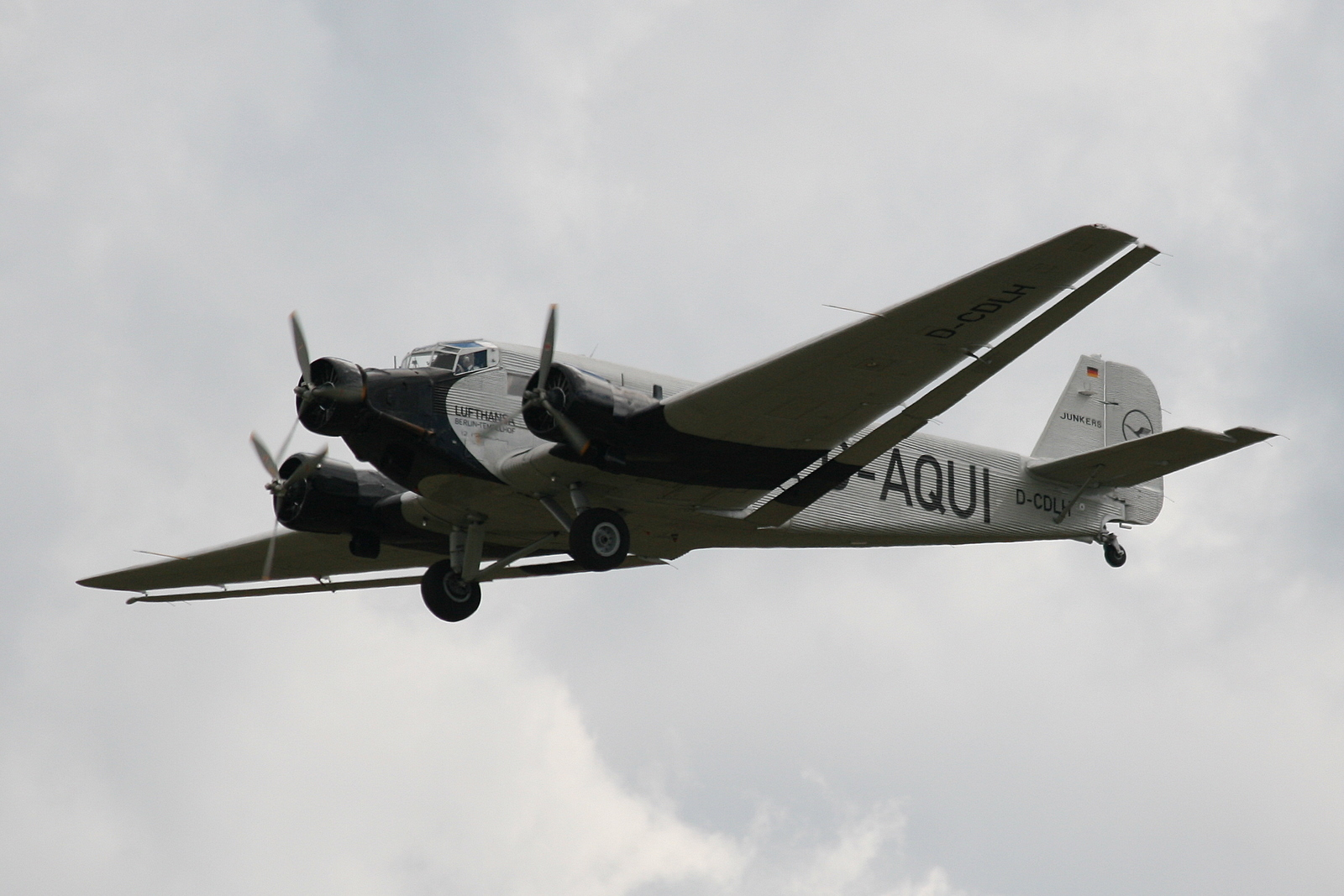
Lufthansa's 21st-century airworthy heritage Ju 52/3mg2e (Wk-Nr 5489) in flight, showing the Doppelflügel, "double wing" trailing-edge control surfaces

The Ju 52 had a low cantilever wing, the midsection of which was built into the fuselage, forming its underside. It was formed around four pairs of circular cross-section duralumin spars with a corrugated surface that provided torsional stiffening. A narrow control surface, with its outer section functioning as the aileron, and the inner section functioning as a flap, ran along the whole trailing edge of each wing panel, well separated from it. The inner flap section lowered the stalling speed and the arrangement became known as the Doppelflügel, or "double wing". The outer sections of this operated differentially as ailerons, projecting slightly beyond the wingtips with control horns. The strutted horizontal stabilizer carried horn-balanced elevators which again projected and showed a significant gap between them and the stabilizer, which was adjustable in-flight. All stabilizer surfaces were corrugated.

Junkers Ju 52

The Ju 52 featured an unusual corrugated duralumin metal skin, which had been pioneered by Junkers during the First World War; the corrugation served to strengthen the whole structure over a smoother approach. The fuselage was of rectangular section with a domed decking, comprising a tubular steel structure that was entirely covered by the corrugated metal skin. A port-side passenger door was placed just aft of the wings; this entrance also acted as a loading hatch for freight, the lower half functioning as a platform to ease cargo movements. The cabin had a dimensional capacity of 17 m^{3} (590 cu ft), and was lined with numerous windows stretching forward to the pilots' cockpit. The main undercarriage was fixed and divided; some aircraft had wheel fairings, others did not. A fixed tailskid, or a later tailwheel, was used. Some aircraft were fitted with floats or skis instead of the main wheels.

In its original configuration, designated the Ju 52/1m, the Ju 52 was a single-engined aircraft, powered by either a BMW IV or Junkers liquid-cooled V-12 engine. However, the single-engined model was deemed to have been underpowered and, after seven prototypes had been completed, all subsequent Ju 52s were built with three radial engines as the Ju 52/3m (drei motoren—"three engines"). Originally powered by three Pratt & Whitney R-1690 Hornet radial engines, later production models mainly received 574 kW (770 hp) BMW 132 engines, a licence-built refinement of the Pratt & Whitney design. Export models were also built with 447 kW (600 hp) Pratt & Whitney R-1340 Wasp and 578 kW (775 hp) Bristol Pegasus VI engines.

The two wing-mounted radial engines of the Ju 52/3m had half-chord cowlings and in planform view (from above/below) appeared to be splayed outwards, being mounted at an almost perpendicular angle to the tapered wing's sweptback leading edge (in a similar fashion to the Mitsubishi G3M bomber and Short Sunderland; the angled engines on the Ju 52 were intended to make maintaining straight flight easier should an engine fail, while the others had different reasons). The three engines had either Townend ring or NACA cowlings to reduce drag from the engine cylinders, although a mixture of the two was most common (as can be seen in many of the accompanying photographs), with deeper-chord NACA cowlings on the wing engines and a narrow Townend ring on the center engine (onto which a deeper NACA cowl was more difficult to fit, due to the widening fuselage behind the engine). Production Ju 52/3m aircraft flown by Deutsche Luft Hansa before the Second World War, as well as Luftwaffe-flown Ju 52s flown during the war, usually used an air-start system to turn over their trio of radial engines, using a common compressed air supply that also operated the main wheels' brakes.

In a military context, the Ju 52 could carry up to 18 fully-equipped soldiers, or 12 stretchers when used as an air ambulance. Transported material was loaded and unloaded through side doors by means of a ramp. Air-dropped supplies were jettisoned through two double chutes; supply containers were dropped by parachute through the bomb-bay doors, and paratroopers jumped through the side doors. Sd.Kfz. 2 Kettenkrafträder (half-track motorcycles) and supply canisters for parachute troops were secured under the fuselage at the bomb bay exits and were dropped with four parachutes. A tow coupling was built into the tail-skid for use in towing freight gliders. The Ju 52 could tow up to two DFS 230 gliders.

== Operational history ==
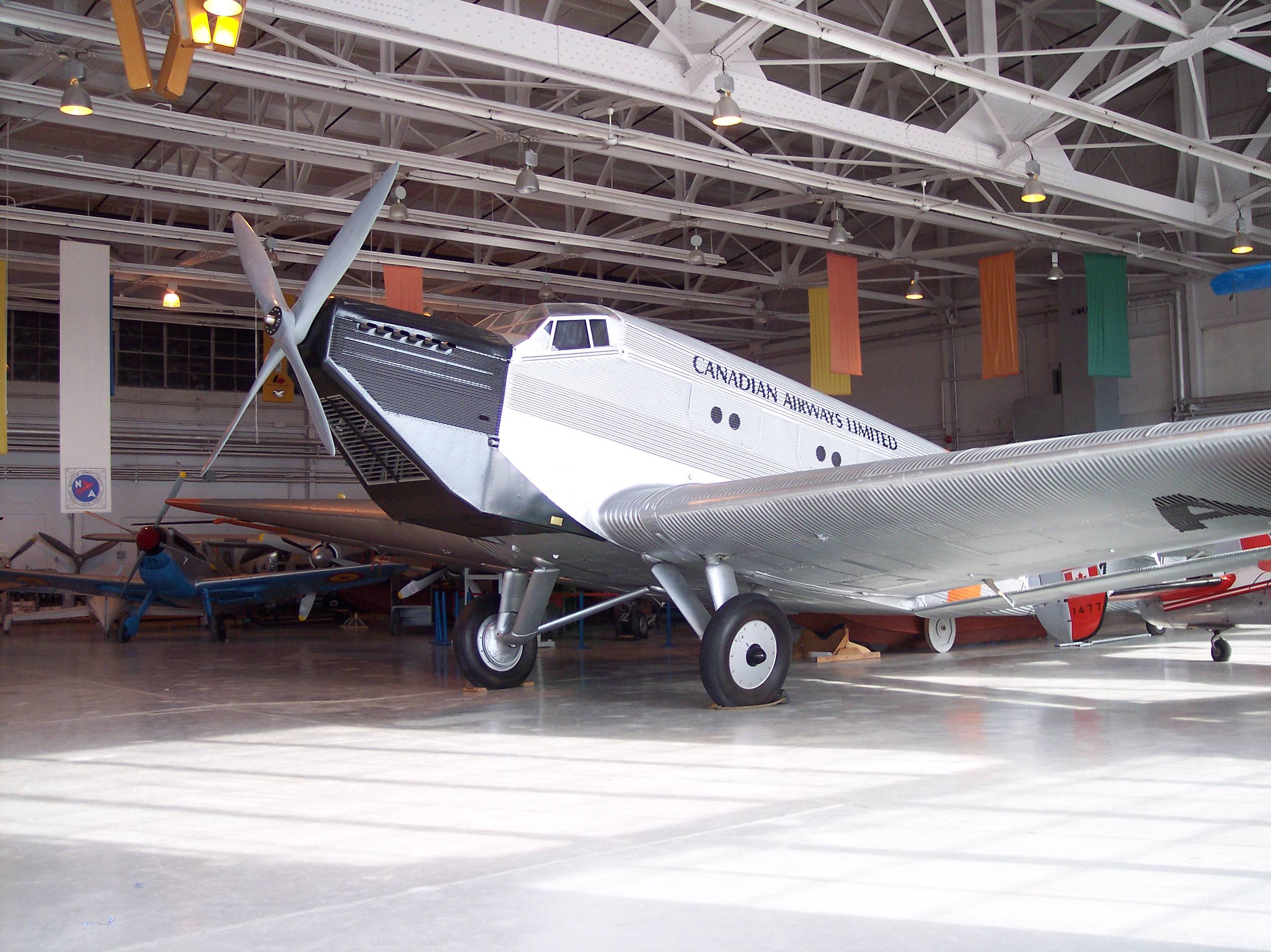
Ju 52/1m replica (converted from 52/3m) of "CF-ARM" at the Royal Aviation Museum of Western Canada, Winnipeg, Manitoba, Canada

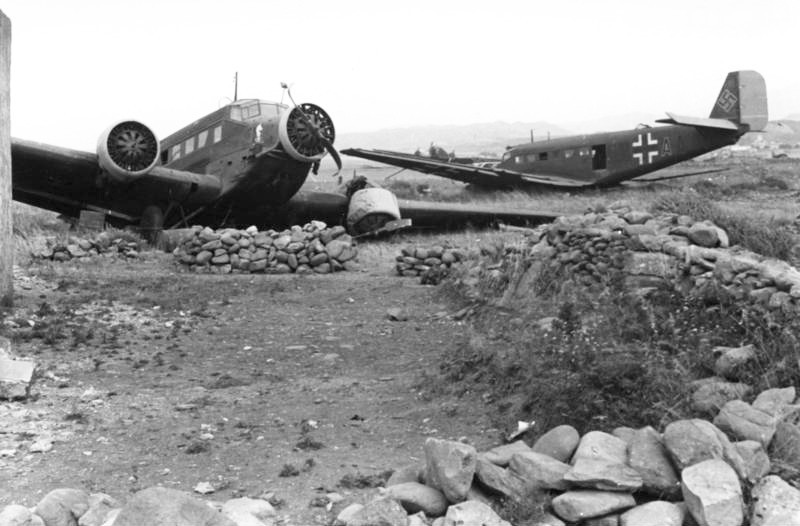
Ju 52s damaged in Crete, 1941

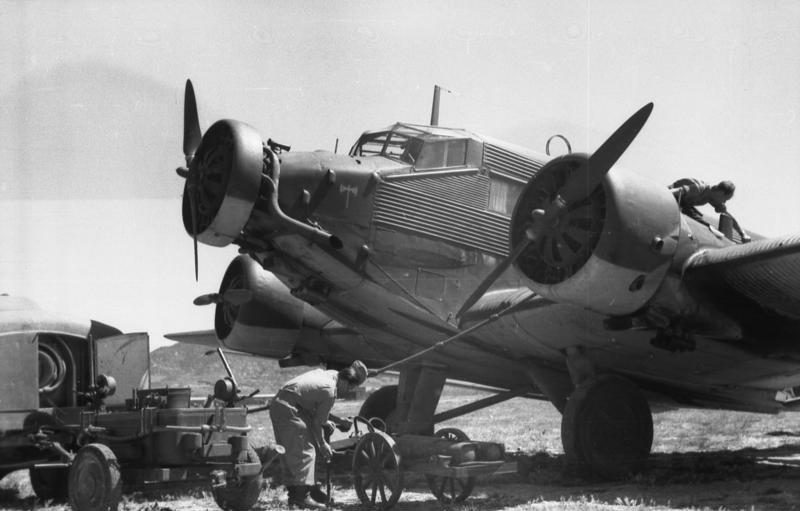
A Luftwaffe Ju 52 being serviced in Crete in 1943: Note the narrow-chord Townend ring on the central engine and the deeper-chord NACA cowlings on the wing engines.

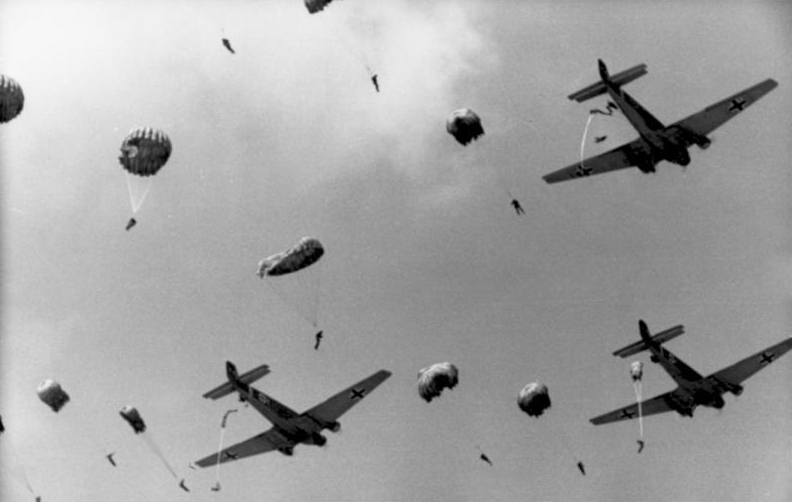
Luftwaffe Ju 52s dropping paratroops

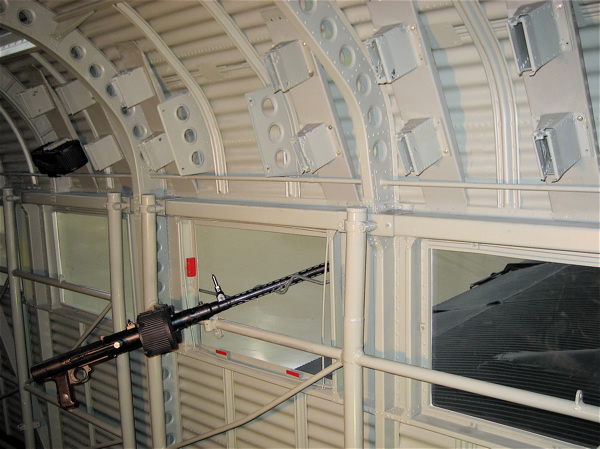
Internal view of Ju 52 showing a defensive MG 15 beam machine gun and storage mounts for spare saddle-drum magazines

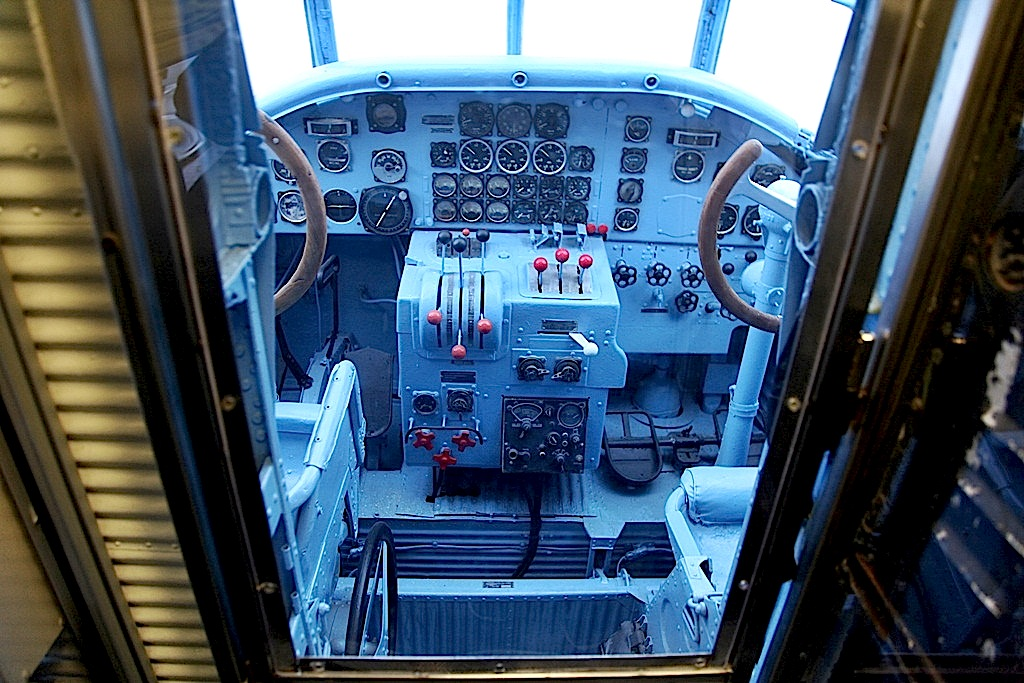
Junkers Ju 52 cockpit layout

=== Prewar civil use ===
In late 1931, James A. Richardson's Canadian Airways received (Werknummer 4006) CF-ARM, the sixth-built Ju 52/1m. The aircraft, first refitted with an Armstrong Siddeley Leopard radial engine and then later with a Rolls-Royce Buzzard and nicknamed the "Flying Boxcar" in Canada, could carry 2,000 kg (4,400 lb) and had a maximum weight of 6,600 kg (14,600 lb). It was commonly used to supply mining and other operations in remote areas with equipment that was too big and heavy for other aircraft then in use. The Ju 52/1m was able to land on wheels, skis, or floats (as were all Ju 52 variants).

Prior to the Nazi government's seizure of control of the Junkers company during 1935, the Ju 52/3m was produced principally as a 17-seat airliner. By 1935, 97 Ju 52s were being operated by numerous airlines; early customers included Finland's Aero O/Y, Sweden's AB Aerotransport, and Brazil's Syndicato Condor.

During May 1932, German flag carrier Luft Hansa took delivery of its first example of the type. The Ju 52 was heavily used by Luft Hansa, it was able to fly from Berlin to Rome in eight hours; both this route and the London-Berlin service was frequently operated by the type. According to Smith, Luft Hansa's Ju 52 fleet eventually numbered 231 Ju 52s; during the pre-war era, it was flown on various routes from Germany on routes in Europe, Asia, and South America.

=== Military use 1932–1945 ===
The Colombian Air Force used three Ju 52/3mde bombers equipped as floatplanes during the Colombia-Peru War in 1932–1933. After the war, the air force acquired three other Ju 52mge as transports; the type remained in service until after the end of the Second World War.

Bolivia acquired four Ju 52s in the course of the Chaco War (1932–1935) against Paraguay, mainly for medical evacuation and air supply. During the conflict, the Ju 52s alone transported more than 4,400 tons of cargo to the front.

In 1934, Junkers received orders to produce a bomber version of the Ju 52/3m to serve as interim equipment for the bomber units of the still-secret Luftwaffe until it could be replaced by the purpose-designed Dornier Do 11. Two bomb bays were fitted, capable of holding up to 1,500 kg (3,300 lb) of bombs, while defensive armament consisted of two 7.92 mm MG 15 machine guns, one in an open dorsal position, and one in a retractable "dustbin" ventral position, which could be manually winched down from the fuselage to protect the aircraft from attacks from below. The bomber could be easily converted to serve in the transport role. The Dornier Do 11 was a failure, however, and the Junkers ended up being acquired in much larger numbers than at first expected, with the type being the Luftwaffe's main bomber until more modern aircraft such as the Heinkel He 111, Junkers Ju 86 and Dornier Do 17 entered into service.

The Ju 52 first was used in military service in the Spanish Civil War against the Spanish Republic. It was one of the first aircraft to be delivered to the Nationalist faction in July 1936, with 20 Ju 52/3m g3e bombers being delivered to the Nationalist forces by Germany within a week of the start of the war. Their first use was to help airlift Franco's Army of Africa from Morocco to the Spanish mainland, bypassing a Spanish republican naval blockade. Between 20 July and the end of August 1936, Ju 52s carried out 461 transport flights, ferrying 7,350 troops together with weapons and equipment, with 5,455 more troops carried in September and a further 1,157 troops carried by the time the airlift ended early in October. According to Smith, the Ju 52 gained a formidable reputation; the type having been reportedly used in practically every major military engagement in support of Nationalist forces. In the Spanish theatre, the Ju 52 was operated both as a bomber and as a transport. In the former role, it participated in the bombing of Guernica, although it was considered obsolete as a bomber by late 1937, by which point it was in the process of being replaced by more capable bombers such as the Dornier Do 17 and Heinkel He 111. The type's final sortie in the theatre was performed on 26 March 1939. By the end of the conflict, Ju 52s had accumulated 13,000 operational hours and had performed 5,400 offensive missions and dropped over 6,000 bombs.

Following the end of the Spanish Civil War, no further aircraft of the bomber variants were built, though the type was again used as a bomber during the bombing of Warsaw during the invasion of Poland in September 1939. The Luftwaffe instead relied on the Ju 52 for transport roles during the Second World War, including paratroop drops.

=== Second World War ===
During its service with Luft Hansa, the Ju 52 had proved to be an extremely reliable passenger airplane. This positive experience contributed to its adoption by the Luftwaffe as a standard aircraft model. In 1938, the 7th Air Division had five air transport groups with 250 Ju 52s. The Luftwaffe had 552 Ju 52s at the start of the Second World War. Though it was built in large numbers, the Ju 52 was technically obsolete. Between 1939 and 1944, 2,804 Ju 52s were delivered to the Luftwaffe (1939: 145; 1940: 388; 1941: 502; 1942: 503; 1943: 887; and 1944: 379). The production of Ju 52s continued until around the summer of 1944; when the war came to an end, 100 to 200 were still available.

Lightly armed, and with a top speed of only 265 km/h (165 mph) — half that of a contemporary Hurricane — the Ju 52 was very vulnerable to fighter attack, and an escort was always necessary when flying in a combat zone.

==== Denmark and Norway campaign ====
The first major operation for the aircraft after the bombing of Warsaw was at the start of Operation Weserübung, the attack on Denmark and Norway on 9 April 1940. 52 Ju 52s from 1. and 8. Staffel in Kampfgeschwader 1 transported a company of Fallschirmjäger (paratroopers) and a battalion of infantry to Aalborg in northern Jutland. These troops captured the airfield there, vital to support later operations in southern Norway. Several hundred Ju 52s were also used to transport troops to Norway in the first days of that campaign.

During the Norwegian campaign, the Luftwaffe's Ju 52s performed a total of 3,018 sorties, 1,830 of which carried troops while the remainder transported cargo and various supplies. According to Smith, 29,280 personnel, 2,376 tons of supplies and 259,300 imp. gallons of fuel were airlifted by Ju 52s through the campaign. Around 150 aircraft were recorded as lost by the end of operations.

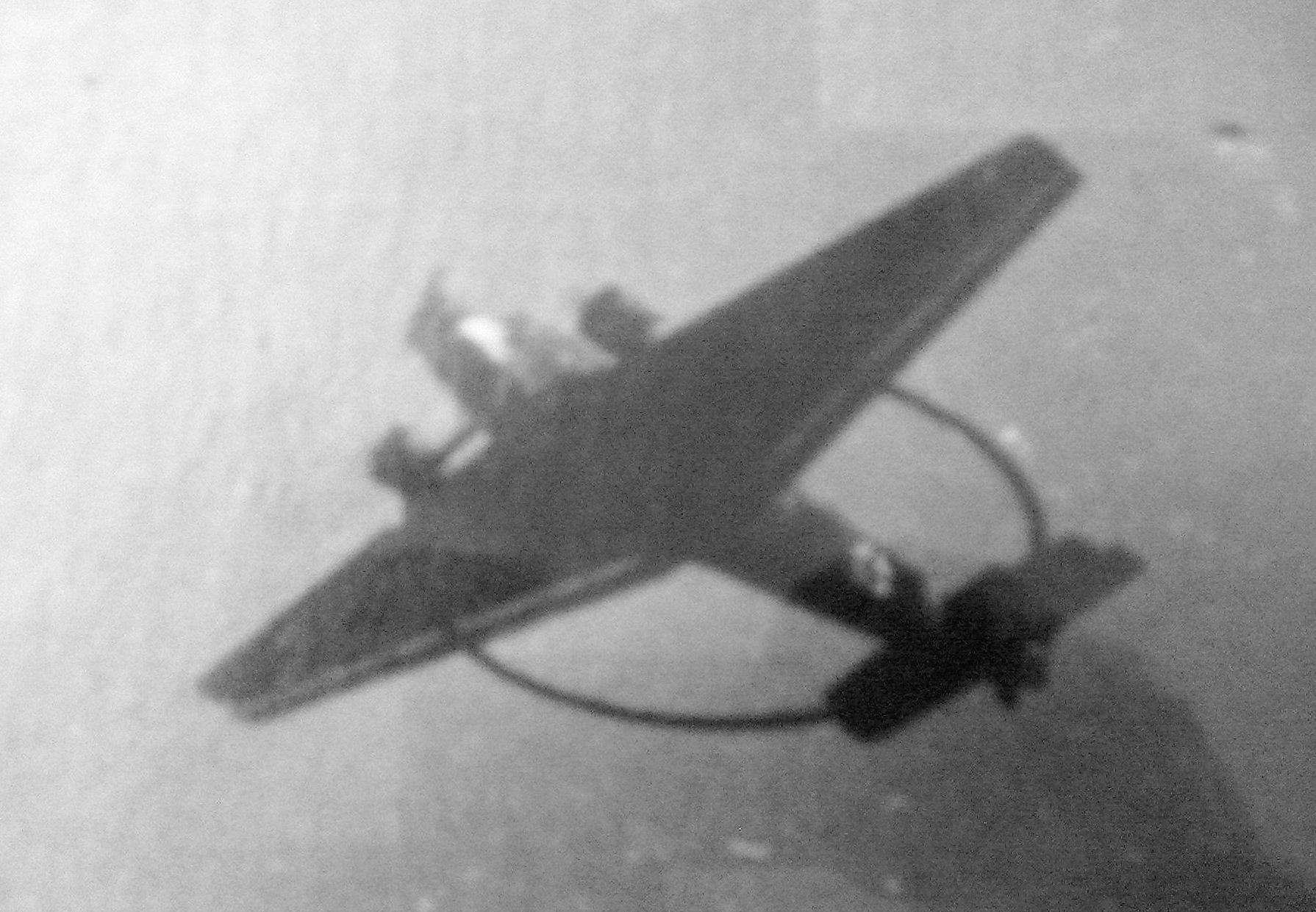
A minesweeper Ju 52/3m MS (Minensuch) equipped with degaussing ring

The seaplane version, equipped with two large floats, served during the Norwegian campaign in 1940, and later in the Mediterranean theatre.

Some Ju 52's, both floatplanes and land planes, were used as minesweepers, known as Minensuch — literally, "mine-search" aircraft in German. These aircraft were fitted with a 14 m (46 ft) diameter current-carrying degaussing ring under the airframe to create a magnetic field that triggered submerged naval mines. They were usually designated by an -"MS" suffix, like similarly equipped Bv 138 MS trimotor flying boats.

==== Netherlands campaign ====
The Ju 52 transport aircraft participated in the attack on the Netherlands on 10 May 1940. It was during this campaign that the Ju 52 performed a crucial role in carrying out the first large-scale air attack with paratroops in history during the Battle for The Hague. According to Smith, 500 Ju 52s had been made ready for the aerial assault on the Low Countries. In addition to the paratroop drops, they also directly landed in hostile territory to deploy assault troops, such as at Ypenburg Airport, on public highways around The Hague, and on the River Meuse (the latter using float-equipped aircraft).

During the opening days of the Netherlands campaign, many German aircraft were shot down by Dutch AA-fire; a total of 125 Ju 52s were lost and 47 damaged; author Hooton considered these losses to have been relatively costly for the Luftwaffe. Although transport operations with the Ju 52 were noticeably curtailed after the initial days of the invasion, the type continued to aerially supply forward ground troops.

During August 1940, large numbers of Ju 52s were based at airfields in the Lyon, Lille, and Arras areas. Luftwaffe transport units were deliberately held at a state of readiness for Operation Sea Lion, the envisioned invasion of the British Isles; however, this operation was never attempted, in part due to the Luftwaffe being unable to secure aerial supremacy during the Battle of Britain.

==== Balkans campaign ====
The next major use of the Ju 52 was in the Balkans campaign. The type has been credited with enabling the rapid deployment of German ground forces throughout the theatre. The Ju 52 was also deployed during the Battle of Crete in late May 1941. 493 Ju 52/3m aircraft were used to transport most of the 22,750 troops flown onto Crete for the Luftwaffe's largest airborne invasion of the war. While victorious, 170 aircraft were lost along with 4,500 personnel; the high loss rate brought about the end of German paratrooper operations.

==== North Africa campaign ====
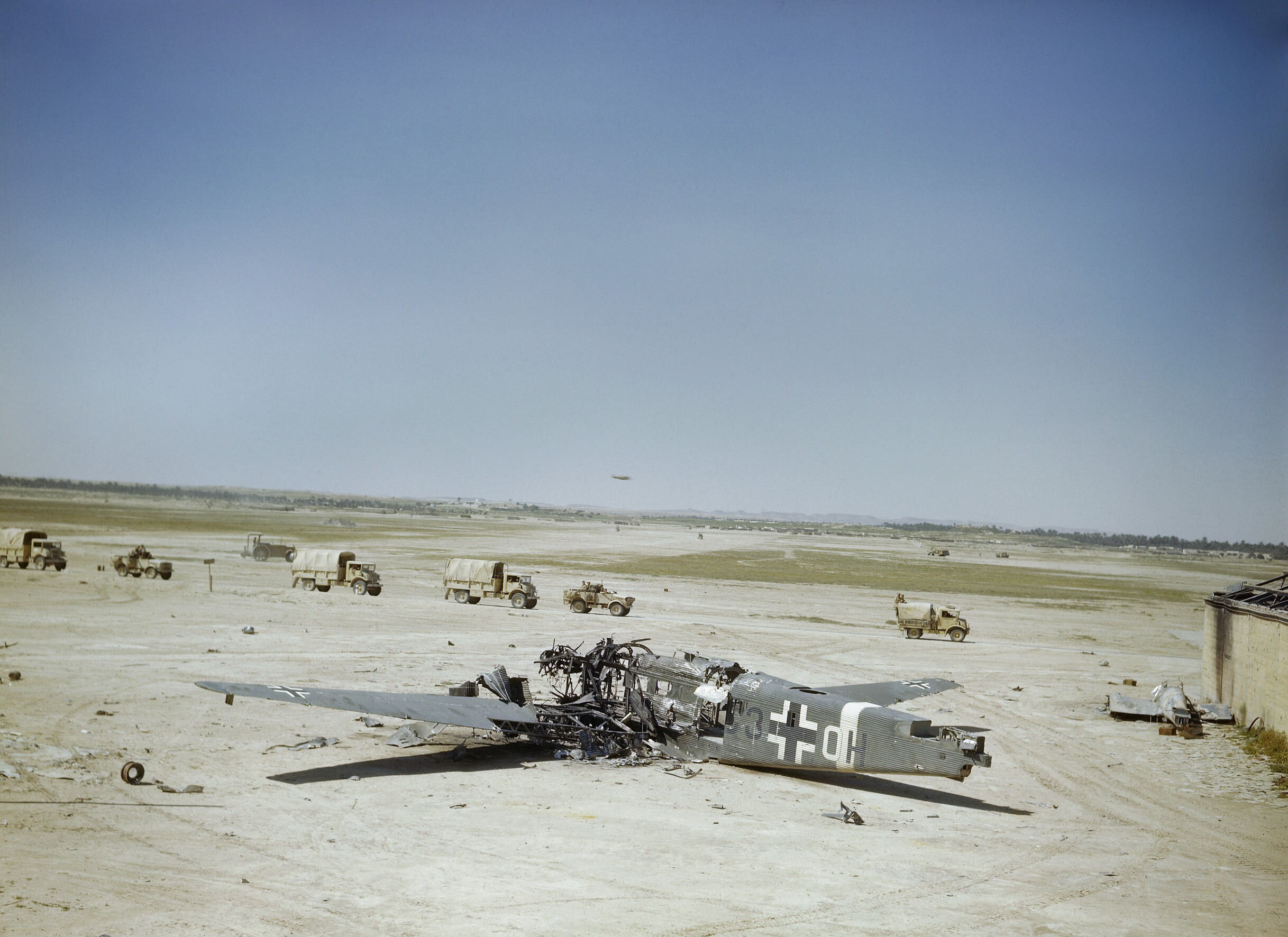
A destroyed Ju 52 in Tunisia, March 1943

During the North African campaign, the Ju 52 was the mainstay reinforcement and resupply transport for the Germans, starting with 20 to 50 flights a day to Tunisia from Sicily in November 1942, building to 150 landings a day in early April as the Axis situation became more desperate. The Allied air forces developed a counter-air operation over a two-month period and implemented Operation Flax on 5 April 1943, destroying 11 Ju 52s in the air near Cap Bon and many more during bombing attacks on its Sicilian airfields, leaving only 29 flyable. That began two catastrophic weeks in which more than 140 aircraft were lost in air interceptions, culminating on 18 April with the "Palm Sunday Massacre" in which 24 Ju 52s were shot down, and another 35 staggered back to Sicily and crash-landed.

==== Stalingrad ====
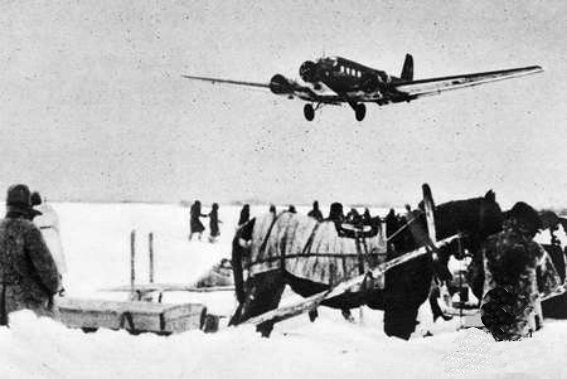
Ju 52 approaching Stalingrad, 1942

Many Ju 52's were shot down by antiaircraft guns and fighters while transporting supplies, most notably during the desperate attempt to resupply the trapped German Sixth Army during the final stages of the Battle of Stalingrad in the winter of 1942–1943.

Between 24 November 1942 and 31 January 1943 488 aircraft were recorded as lost: this number includes 266 Ju 52, 165 He 111, 42 Ju 86, 9 Fw 200, 5 He 177 and 1 Ju 290).

=== Hitler's personal transport ===
Hitler used a Deutsche Luft Hansa Ju 52 for campaigning in the 1932 German election, preferring flying to train travel. After he became Chancellor of Germany in 1933, Hans Baur became his personal pilot, and Hitler was provided with a personal Ju 52. Named Immelmann II after the First World War ace Max Immelmann, it carried the registration D-2600. As his power and importance grew, Hitler's personal air force grew to nearly 50 aircraft, based at Berlin Tempelhof Airport and made up mainly of Ju 52s, which also flew other members of his cabinet and war staff. In September 1939, at Baur's suggestion, Immelmann II was replaced by a four-engine Focke-Wulf Fw 200 Condor, although Immelman II remained his backup aircraft for the rest of the Second World War.

=== Chiang Kai-shek's personal transport ===
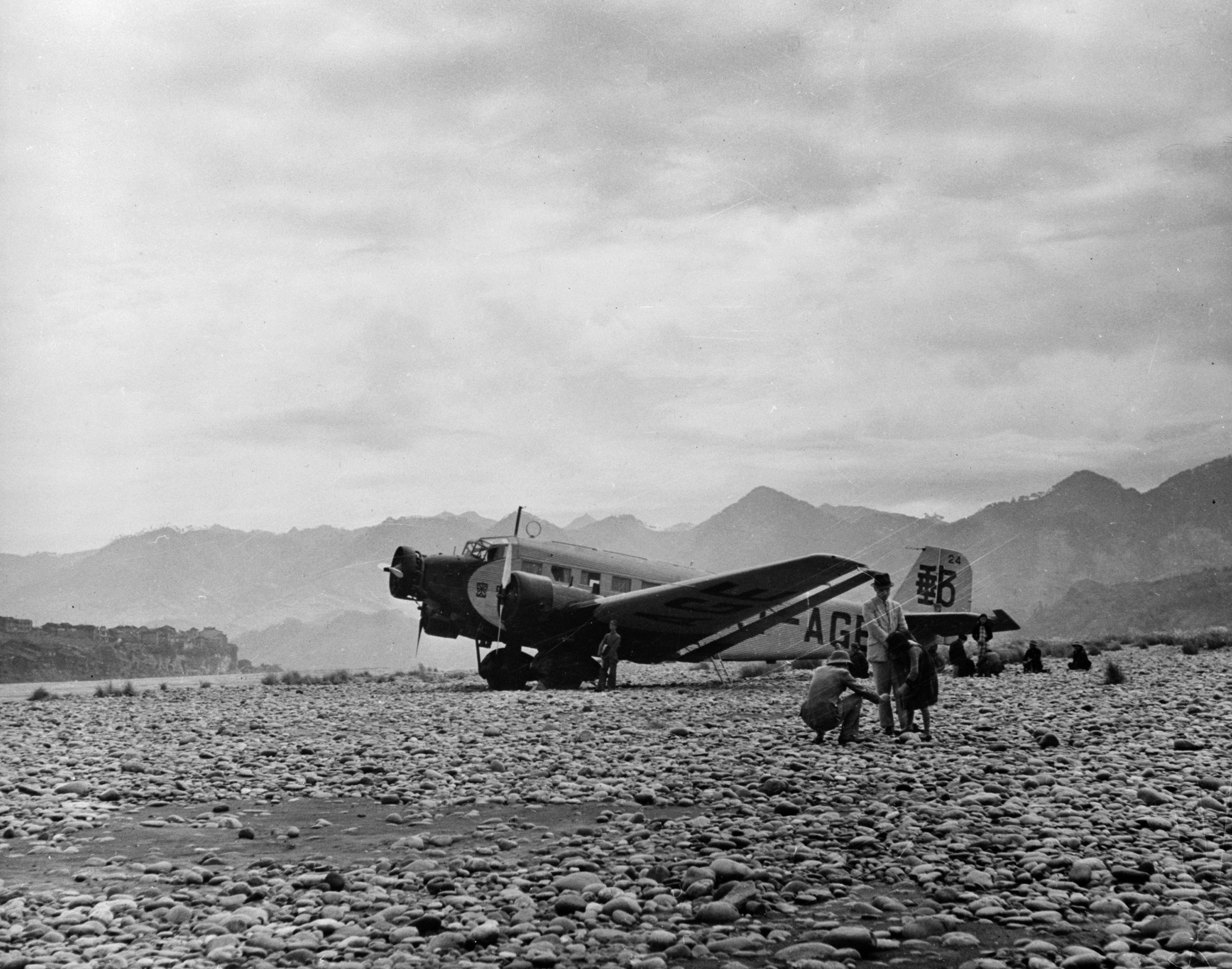
Ju 52 of Eurasia, 1930s in China

Eurasia was a major Chinese airliner company in the 1930s and operated at least seven Ju 52/3ms. A further example, sent out as a demonstrator to Eurasia, was purchased by the Chinese Nationalist Party government and became Chiang Kai-shek's personal transport.

=== Postwar use ===
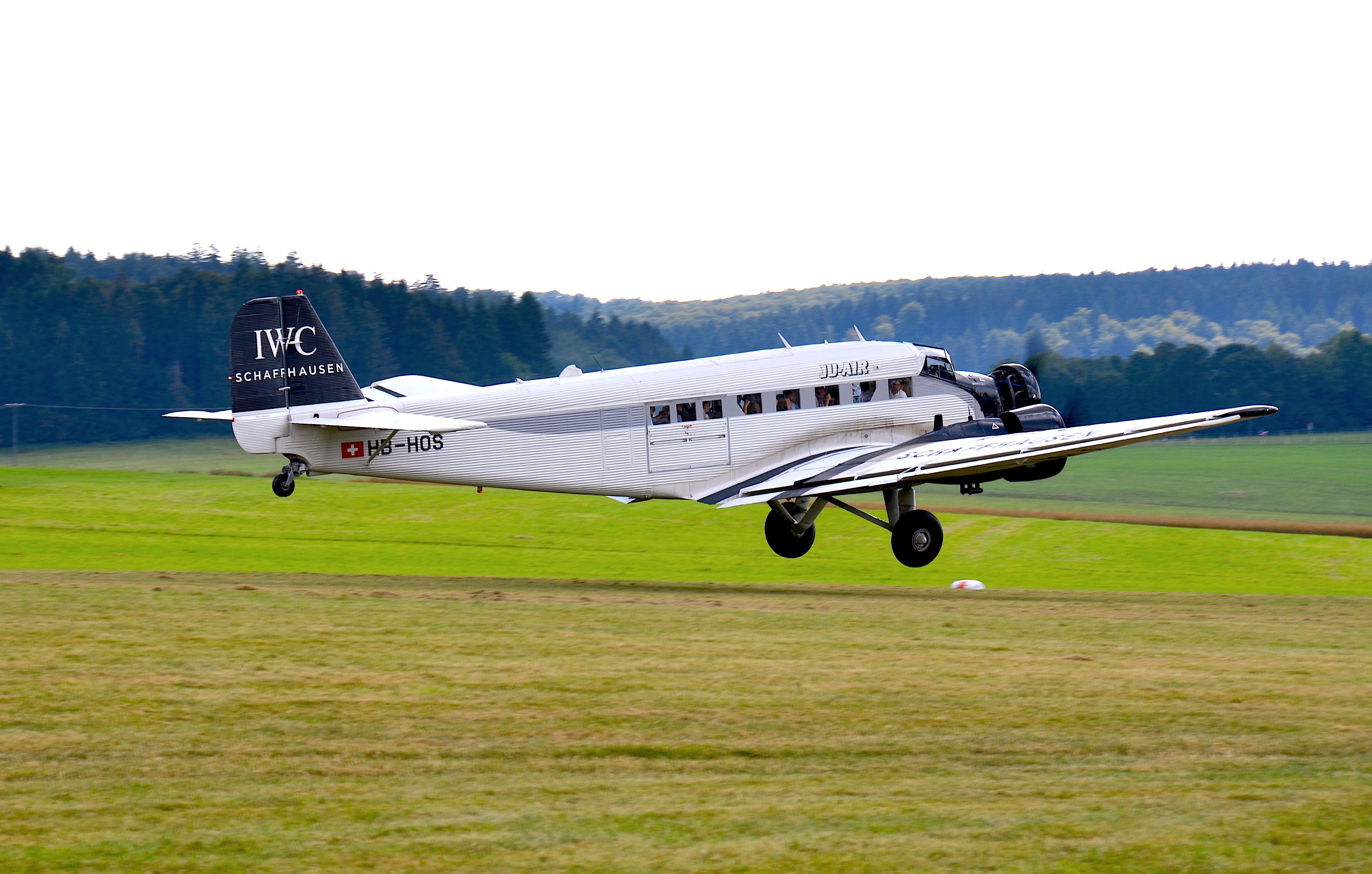
Ju 52 HB-HOS on sightseeing tour at Degerfeld airfield (2016)

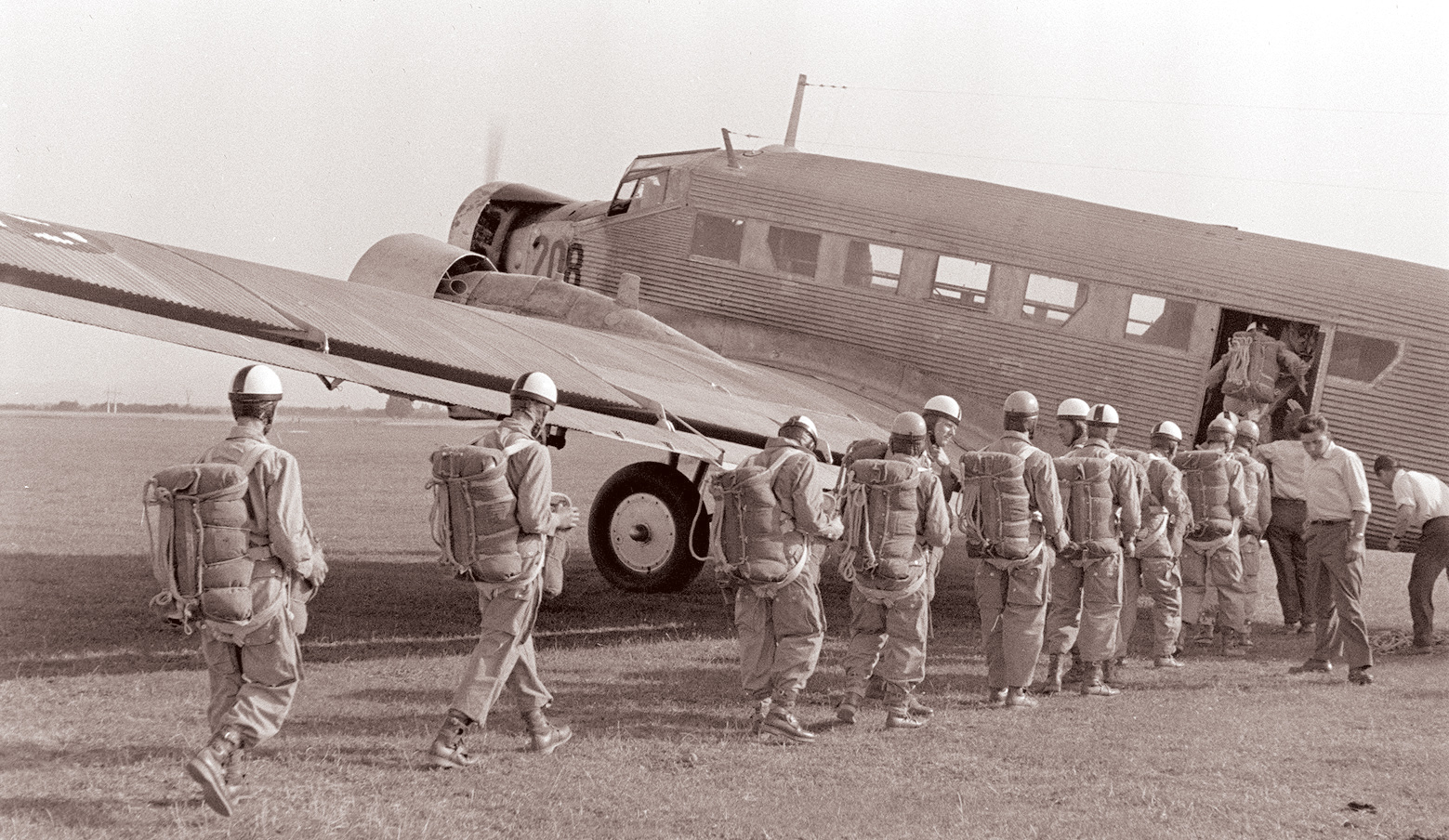
Skydivers Letalski center Maribor, Maribor Airport, 1960

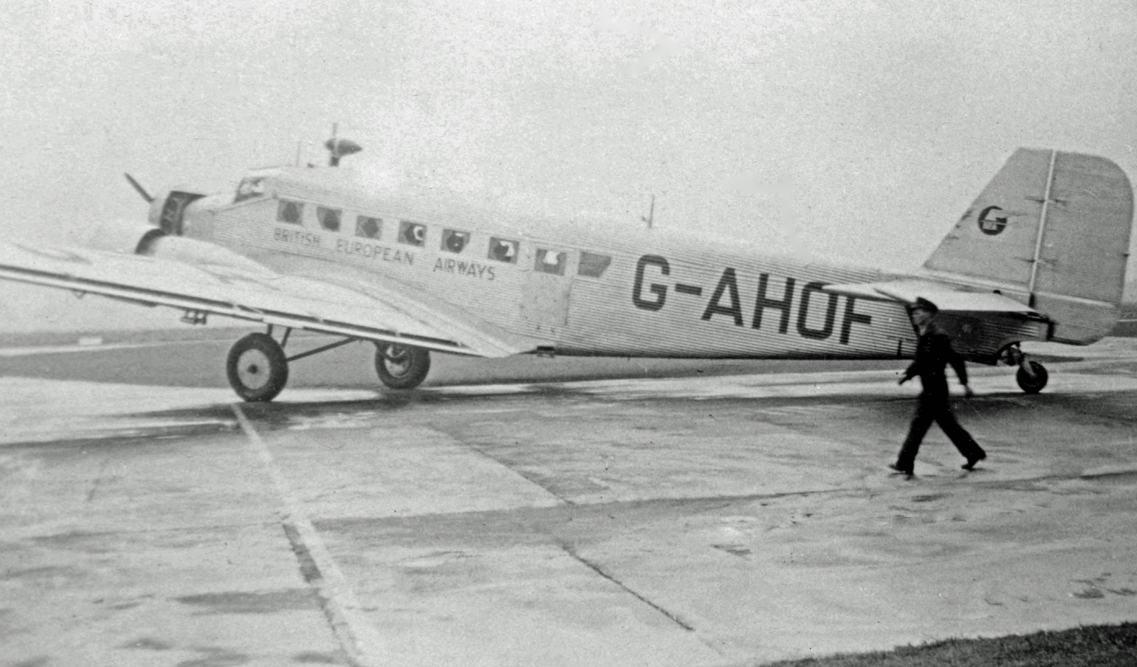
Ju 52/3m of British European Airways in 1947

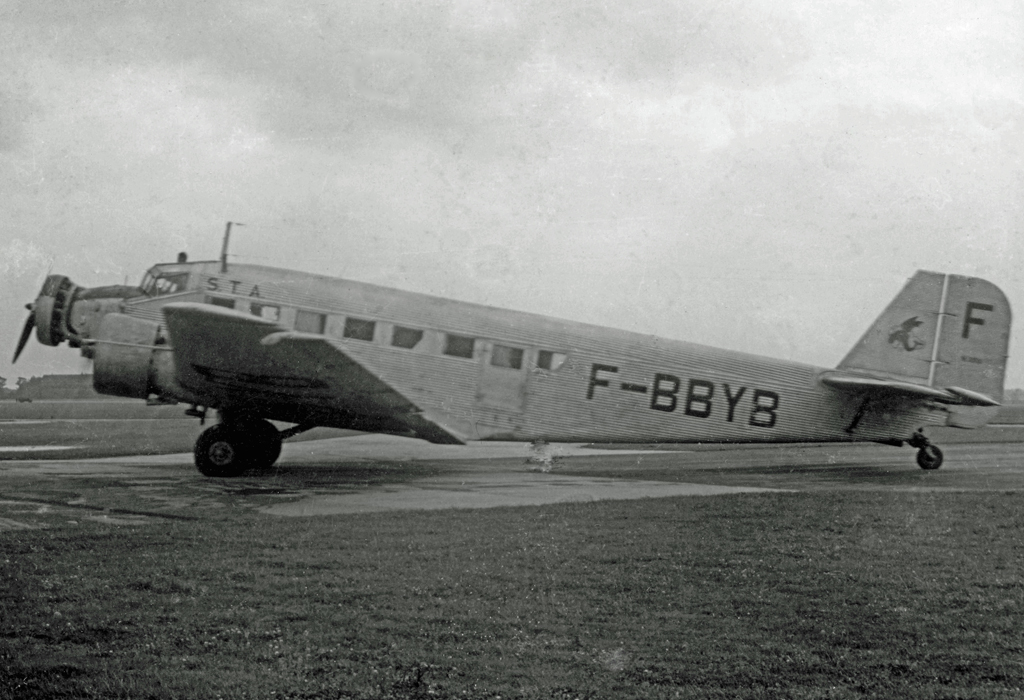
French-built AAC.1 of STA at Manchester Airport in 1948: This aircraft is preserved in Belgrade.

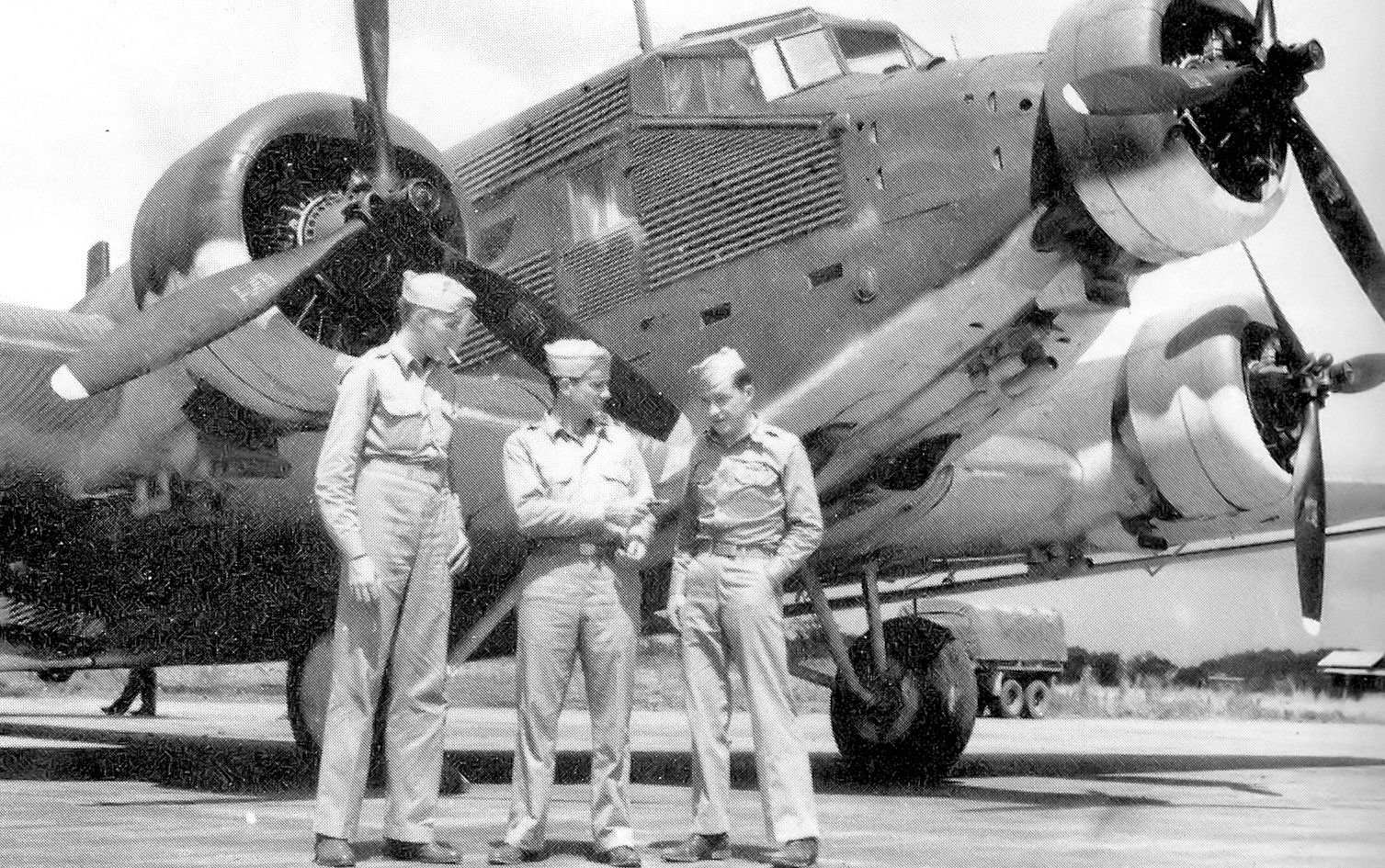
Junkers C-79, s/n 42-52883, at Howard Field, Panama Canal Zone, late 1942 with the USAAF 20th Transportation Squadron, Sixth Air Force

Various Junkers Ju 52s continued in military and civilian use following World War II. In 1956, the Portuguese Air Force, which was already using the Ju 52s as a transport plane, employed the type as a paratroop drop aircraft for its newly organized elite parachute forces, later known as the Batalhão de Caçadores Páraquedistas. The paratroopers used the Ju 52 in several combat operations in Angola and other Portuguese African colonies before gradually phasing it out of service in the 1960s.

The Swiss Air Force also operated the Ju 52 from 1939 to 1982, when three aircraft remained in operation, probably the last and longest service in any air force. Museums hoped to obtain the aircraft, but they were not for sale. They are still in flying condition and together with a CASA 352 can be booked for sightseeing tours with Ju-Air. During the 1950s, the Ju 52 was also used by the French Air Force during the First Indochina War as a bomber. The use of these Junkers was quite limited.

The Spanish Air Force operated the Ju 52, nicknamed Pava, until well into the 1970s. Escuadrón 721, flying the Spanish-built versions, was employed in training parachutists from Alcantarilla Air Base near Murcia.

Some military Ju 52s were converted to civilian use. For example, British European Airways operated 11 ex-Luftwaffe Ju 52/3mg8e machines, taken over by the RAF, between 1946 and retirement in 1947 on intra-U.K. routes before the Douglas DC-3 was introduced to the airline. French airlines such as Societe de Transports Aeriens (STA) and Air France flew Toucans in the late 1940s and early 1950s.

In the USSR, captured Ju 52s were allocated to the Civil Air Fleet, being found particularly suitable for transporting sulphur from the Karakum Desert. Various Soviet agencies used the Ju 52 through to 1950.

In Yugoslavia the Ju-52 was in use by Yugoslav Air Force, which also heavily financed flying clubs such as Letalski center Maribor and supported many parachuting sports activities with them. Yugoslav plane number 208 dropped paratroopers for the last time in 1960 at Maribor Airport and today is preserved in the Aeronautical Museum Belgrade.

A Ju 52 and a Douglas DC-3 were the last aircraft to take off from Berlin Tempelhof Airport before all operations ceased there on 30 October 2008.

=== Other versions ===
Most Ju 52s were destroyed after the war, but 585 were built after 1945. In France, they had been manufactured during the war by the Junkers-controlled Avions Amiot company, and production continued afterwards as the Amiot AAC 1 Toucan. In Spain, Construcciones Aeronáuticas SA continued production as the CASA 352 and 352L. Four CASA 352s are airworthy and in regular use today.

=== New Generation ===
In April 2022, 90 years after the first flight of the Ju 52/3m, the Swiss Junkers Flugzeugwerke AG announced the successor model of the Ju 52, the Ju 52 New Generation. The Ju 52 New Generation will be able to carry 14 passengers and will have modern RED A03 engines and modern avionics. The market launch is not expected before 2025.

== Variants ==
Data from Junkers Aircraft & Engines 1913–1945

=== Civil variants ===
Ju 52
Prototype of the single-engined transport aircraft, of twelve laid down only six were completed as single-engined aircraft. First flight: 3 September 1930, powered by a BMW VIIaU engine.
Ju 52/1mba
The prototype Ju 52, (c/n 4001, regn D-1974), redesignated after being re-engined with a single Junkers L88 engine
Ju 52/1mbe
Aircraft powered by BMW VIIaU
Ju 52/1mbi
The second prototype, (c/n 4002, regn D-2133), fitted with a 600 kW (800 hp) Armstrong Siddeley Leopard engine
Ju 52/1mca
D-1974 fitted with drag flaps and refitted with a BMW VIIaU
Ju 52/1mcai
D-2356, (c/n 4005), crashed in May 1933
Ju 52/1mce
D-USON (c/n 4003) used as a target tug. D-2317, (c/n 4004), converted to a torpedo bomber in Sweden as the K 45
Ju 52/1mci
The second prototype fitted with 11.05 m (36 ft 3 in) long stepped floats, flying from the River Elbe on 17 July 1931
Ju 52/1mdi
The second prototype after having the floats removed and undercarriage reinstated, registered as D-USUS from 1934
Ju 52/1mdo
D-1974 fitted with a Junkers Jumo 4 engine as a testbed, reregistered as D-UZYP from 1937
Ju 52/3m
Three-engined prototype, powered by three 410 kW (550 hp) Pratt & Whitney R-1340 Wasp engines, first flight: 7 March 1932
Ju 52/3mba
VIP version for the president of the Fédération Aéronautique Internationale, Romanian prince George Valentin Bibescu, powered by a 560 kW (750 hp) Hispano-Suiza 12Mb engine in the nose and two 423 kW (567 hp) Hispano-Suiza 12Nb engines (one on each wing)
Ju 52/3mce
Three-engined civil transport aircraft, powered by three Pratt & Whitney Hornet or BMW 132 engines
Ju 52/3mci
Planned version for Sweden, powered by Pratt & Whitney Wasp engines, not built
Ju 52/3mde
Seaplane version for Bolivia and Colombia, converted from Ju 52/1m
Ju 52/3mfe
Improved version, with chassis reinforcements and NACA cowlings on the outer engines, powered by three BMW 132A-3 engines
Ju 52/3mf1e
Trainer version for DVS
Ju 52/3mge
Airliner version, powered by BMW Hornet 132A engines
Ju 52/3mho
Two aircraft powered by Junkers Jumo 205C diesel engines, used only for testing
Ju 52/3mkao
Version powered by two BMW 132A and one BMW 132F or BMW 132N as a testbed
Ju 52/3ml
Powered by three 489 kW (656 hp) Pratt & Whitney R-1690-S1EG engines
Ju 52/3mlu
Airliner version for Italy, powered by Piaggio Stella X engines, later re-engined with Alfa Romeo 126RC/34 engines
Ju 52/3mmao
Similar to kao except with NACA cowling
Ju 52/3mnai
Airliner version for Sweden and Great Britain, powered by Pratt & Whitney Wasp engines
Ju 52/3mreo
Airliner version for South America, powered by BMW 132Da/Dc engines
Ju 52/3msai
Airliner version for Sweden and South Africa, powered by Pratt & Whitney Wasp engines
Ju 52/3mte
Airliner version, powered by three BMW 132K engines
Ju 52/3mZ5
Export version for Finland, powered by BMW 132Z-3 engines

=== Military variants ===
Ju 52/3mg3e
Improved military version, powered by three 541 kW (725 hp) BMW 132A-3 (improved version of the Pratt & Whitney R-1690 Hornet) radial engines, equipped with an improved radio and bomb-release mechanism. Later versions had a tailwheel that replaced the tailskid.
Ju 52/3mg4e
Military transport version, the tailskid was replaced by a tailwheel.
Ju 52/3mg5e
Similar to g4e, but powered by three 619 kW (830 hp) BMW 132T-2 engines, it could be fitted with interchangeable floats, skis, and wheeled landing gear.
Ju 52/3mg6e
Transport version equipped with extra radio gear and autopilot, could also be fitted with a degaussing ring
Ju 52/3mg7e
Transport version, capable of carrying 18 troops or 12 stretchers, featured autopilot and larger cargo doors
Ju 52/3mg8e
Similar to g6e, but with improved radio and direction finding gear, a few were fitted with floats.
Ju 52/3mg9e
Tropical version of g4e for service in North Africa, fitted with glider towing gear and strengthened undercarriage
Ju 52/3mg10e
Similar to g9e, but could be fitted with floats or wheels, lacked deicing equipment
Ju 52/3mg11e
Similar to g10e, but fitted with deicing equipment
Ju 52/3mg12e
Land transport version, powered by three BMW 132L engines
Ju 52/3m12e
Civilian version of Ju 52/3mg12e for Luft Hansa
Ju 52/3mg13e
No details are known.
Ju 52/3mg14e
Similar to g8e, but with improved armor, last German production version

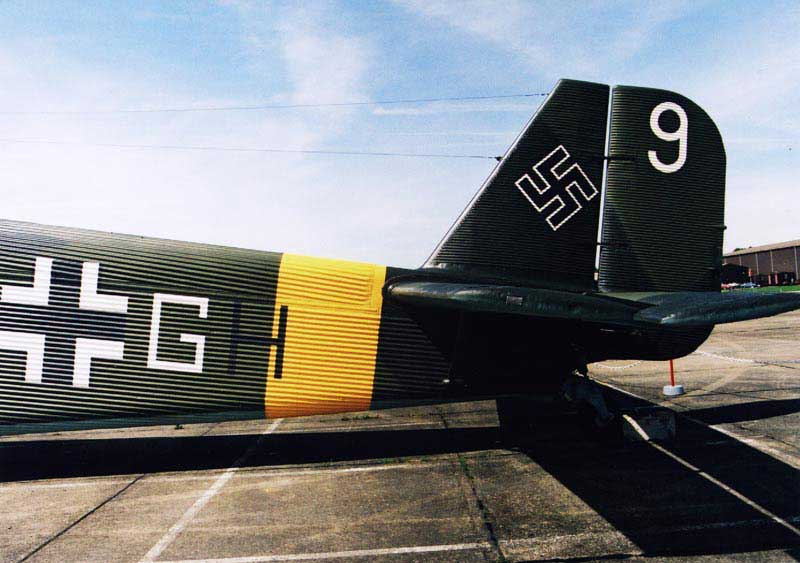
Preserved AAC 1 showing corrugated skin, at Duxford, 2001

A.A.C. 1 Toucan
Postwar French version of g11e, 415 built
CASA 352
Postwar Spanish version, 106 built
CASA 352L
Spanish version with Spanish 578 kW (775 hp) ENMA Beta B-4 (license-built BMW 132) engines, 64 built
C-79
Designation assigned to a single example operated by the United States Army Air Forces
D52
Designation used by the Czechoslovak Air Force
T2B
Designation used by the Spanish Air Force
Tp 5
Designation used by the Swedish Air Force
K 45c
A single Ju 52/1mce (c/n 4004) was delivered to the Junkers factory at Limhamn in Sweden, where it was converted to a torpedo bomber as the K 45c.

== Operators ==
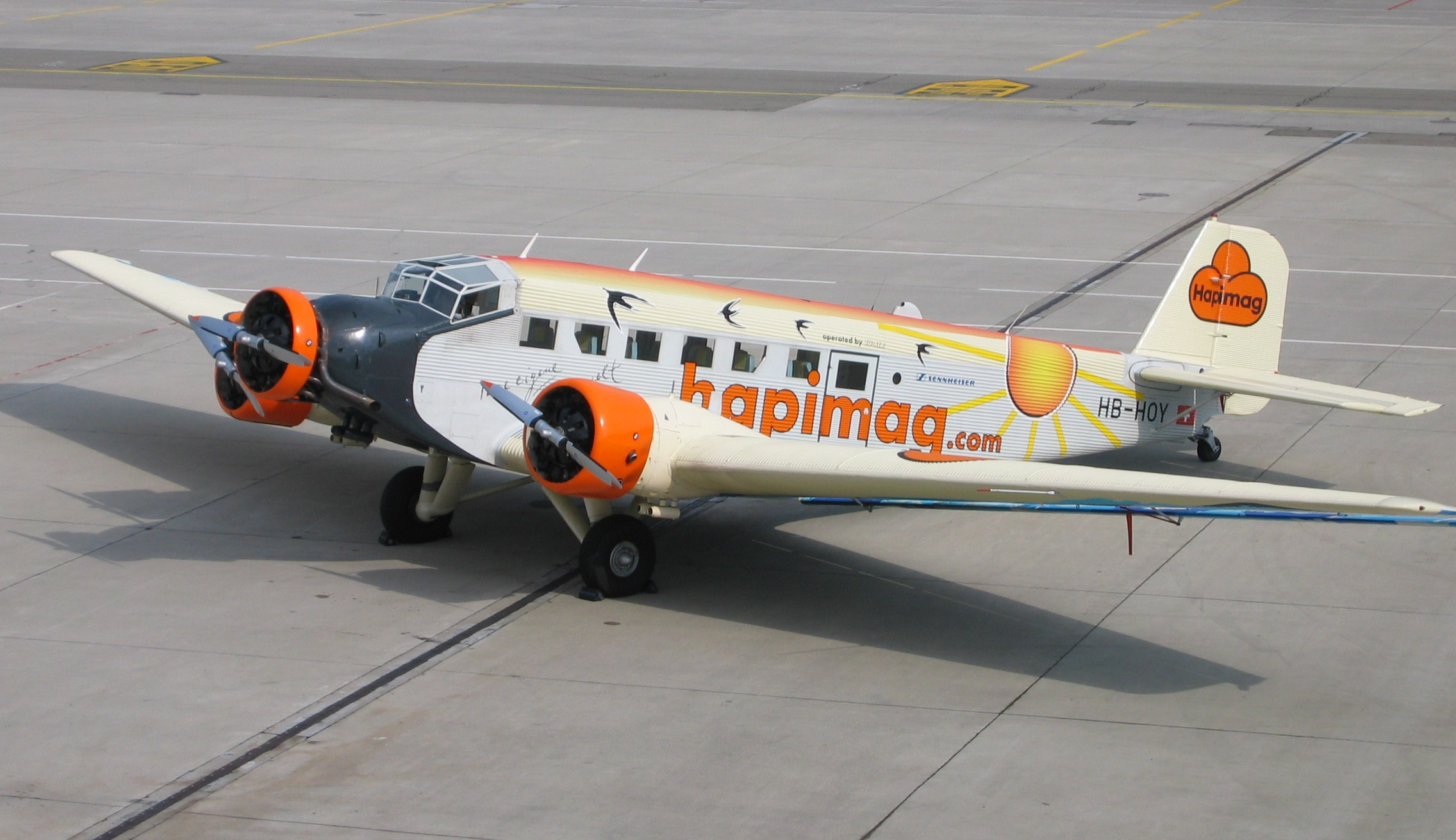
CASA 352 (license-built Junkers Ju 52/3m) in Ju-Air markings at Zürich airport

- Argentina
- Austria
- Belgium
- Bolivia
- Brazil
- Bulgaria
- Canada
- Chile
- China
- Colombia
- Croatia
- Czechoslovakia
- Denmark
- Ecuador
- Estonia
- Finland
- France
- Germany
- Germany
- Greece
- Hungary
- Italy
- Lebanon
- Norway
- Peru
- Poland
- Portugal
- Romania
- South Africa
- Slovak Republic
- Soviet Union
- Spanish State
- Sweden
- Switzerland
- Turkey
- United Kingdom
- United States
- Uruguay
- Yugoslavia

== Surviving aircraft ==
=== Airworthy ===
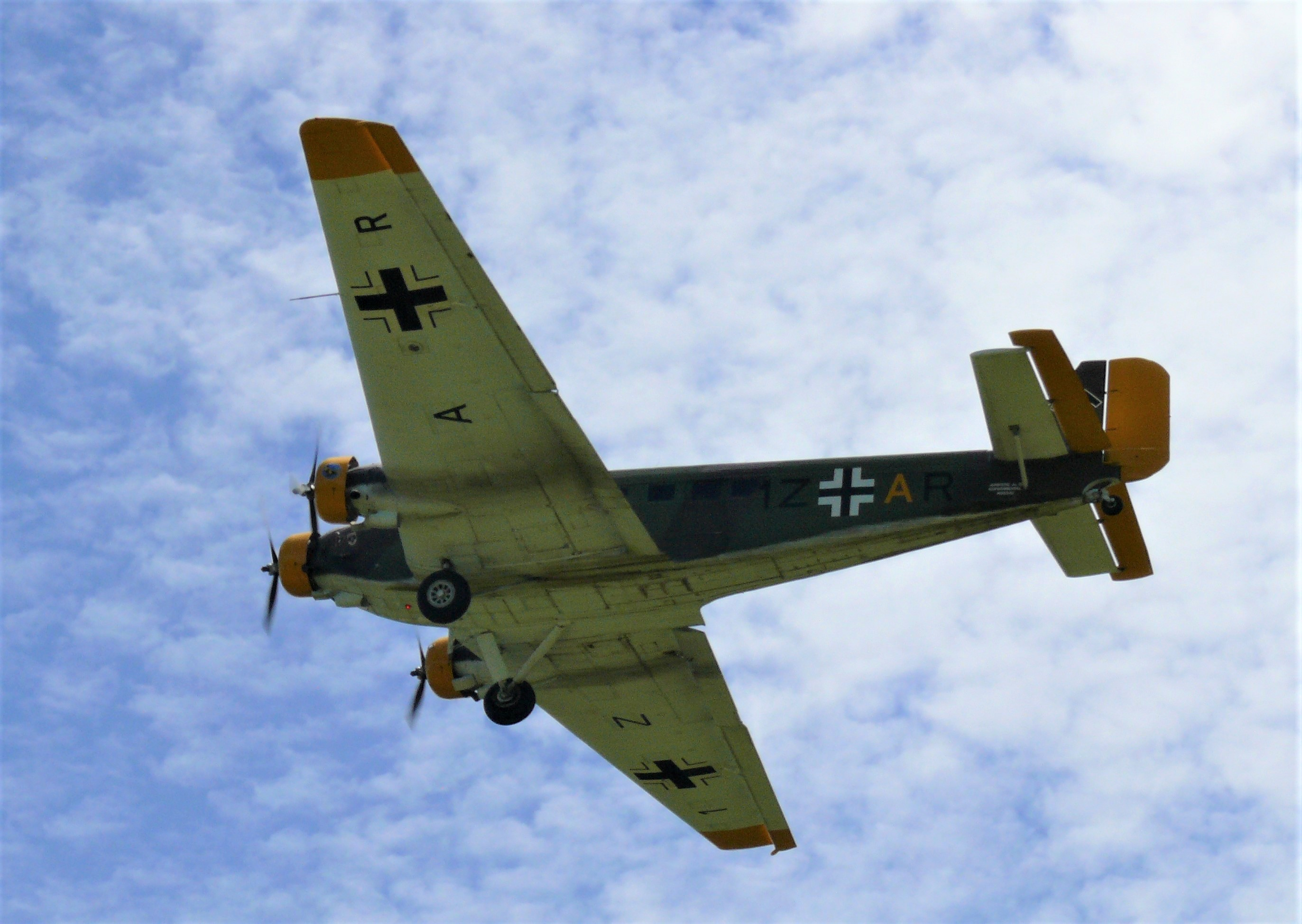
CASA 352L in flight over the Military Aviation Museum

France

- T.2B-212 – Ju 52/3m airworthy with Amicale J.B. Salis in Cerny, Essonne.

South Africa

- T.2B-273 – CASA 352L airworthy at the South African Airways Museum Society in Germiston, Gauteng. Bought from England in 1981 to celebrate the 50th anniversary of South African Airways.

United States

- T.2B-176 – CASA 352L airworthy at the Military Aviation Museum in Virginia Beach, Virginia. Formerly owned by Commemorative Air Force, operated by MAM since August 2010. Converted to Pratt & Whitney R-1340 geared engines, fitted with 3-blade propellers.

=== On display ===
Argentina

- T-158 – Ju 52/3mge in storage at the Museo Nacional de Aeronáutica de Argentina in Morón, Buenos Aires.

Belgium

- 6309 – Ju 52/3mg7e on static display at the Royal Museum of the Armed Forces and Military History in Brussels.

Canada

- T.2B-148 – CASA 352L on static display at the Royal Aviation Museum of Western Canada in Winnipeg, Manitoba. It has been converted to resemble a Ju 52/1m.

Colombia

- FAC-625 – Ju 52/3mg4e on static display at the Colombian Aerospace Museum in Tocancipá, Cundinamarca.

France

- 6311 – Ju 52/3mg7e in storage with the Association des Mécaniciens Pilotes d'Aéronefs Anciens in Brétigny-sur-Orge, Essonne. It was acquired by the organization in 2011 from the Museu do Ar, where it had been in storage.

Germany

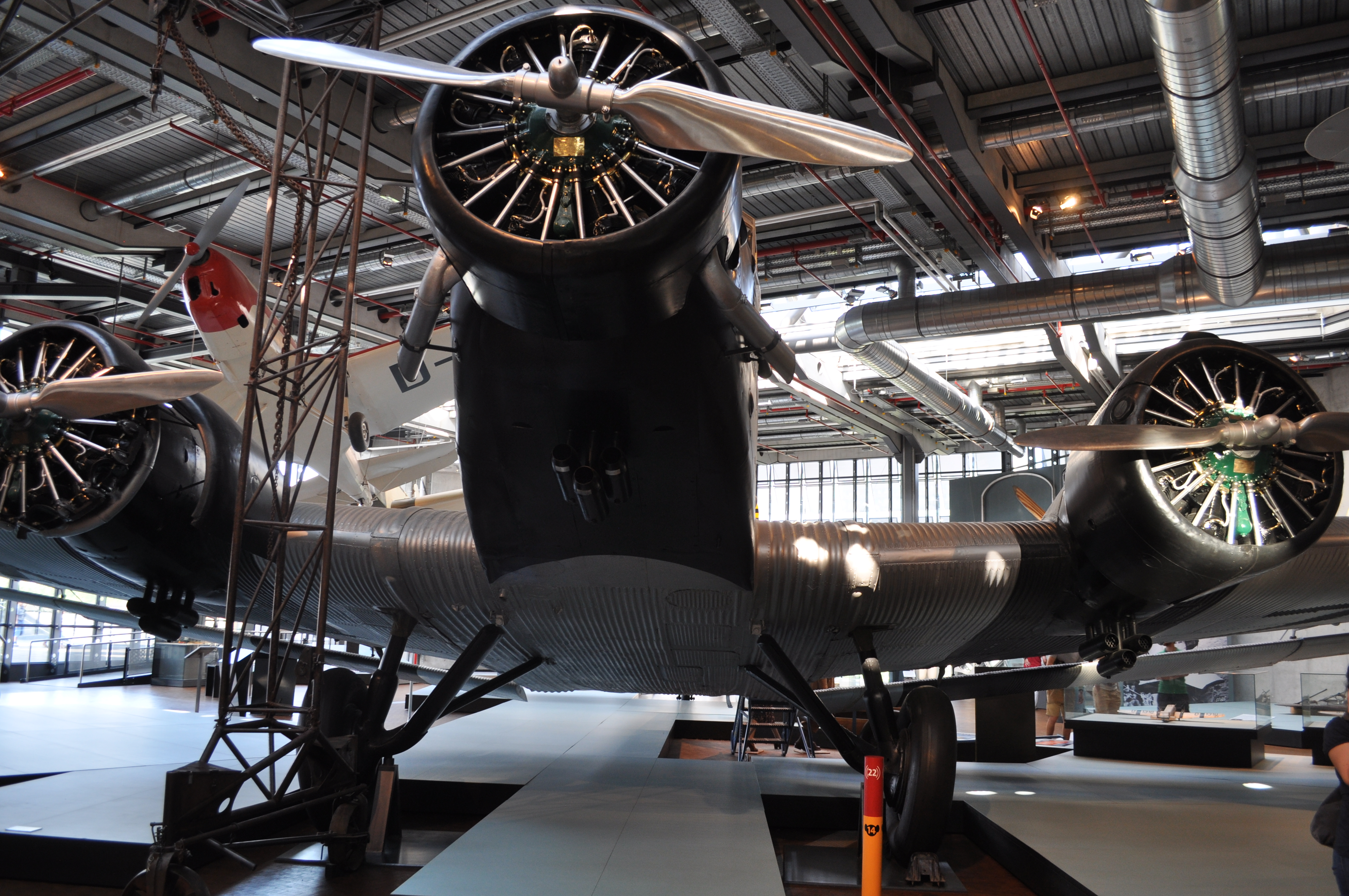
Ju 52/3m on display at the Deutsches Technikmuseum in Berlin

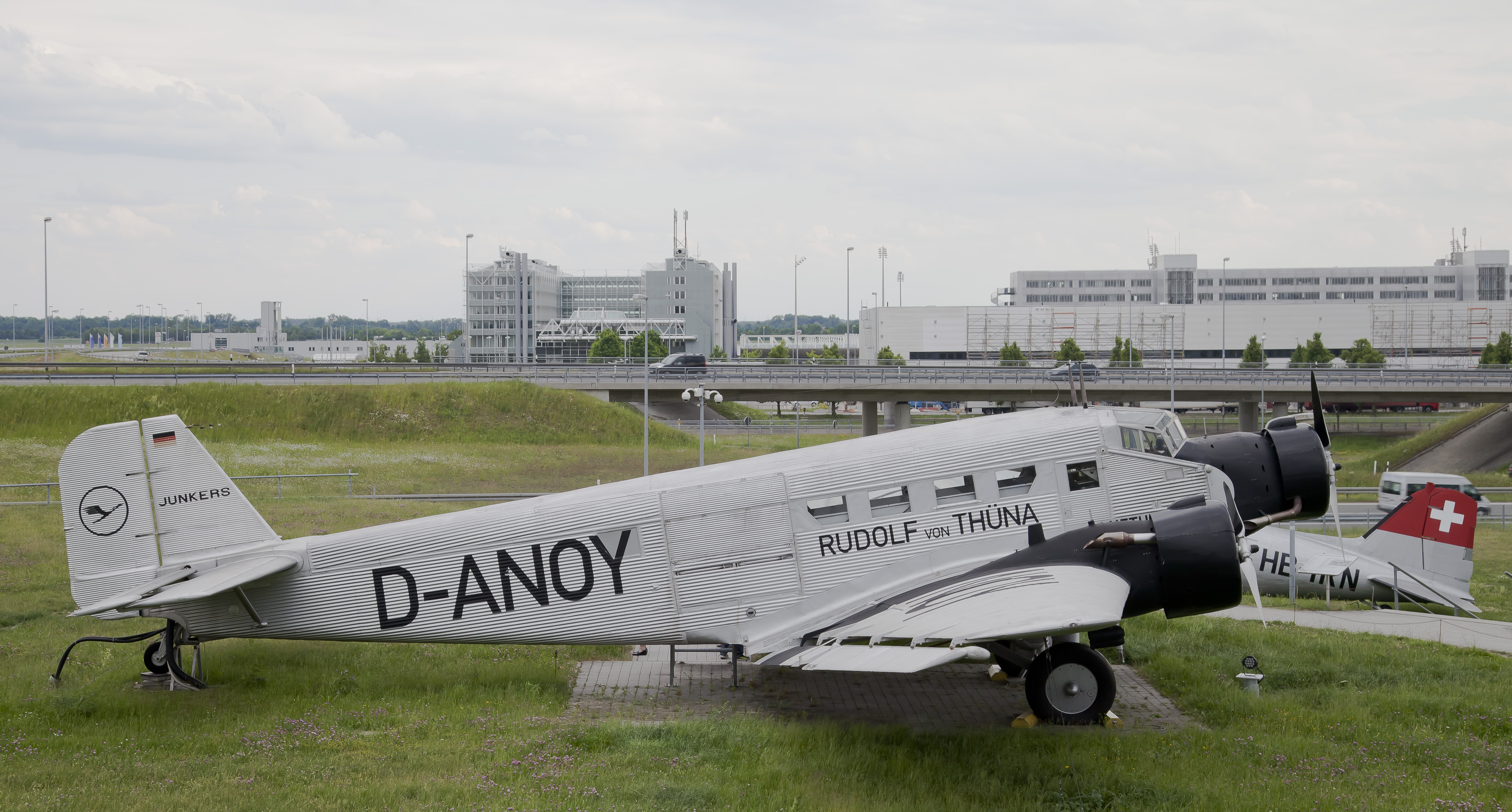
CASA 352L on display at Munich Airport

- 363 – AAC.1 on static display at the Deutsches Museum in Munich, Bavaria.
- 6320 – AAC.1 on display at Verein fur Historische Luftfahrzeuge in Monchengladbach, North Rhine-Westphalia. On loan from Hugo Junkers Kaserne.
- 6134 – Ju 52/3mg4e on static display at the Technikmuseum Hugo Junkers in Dessau, Saxony-Anhalt.
- 6693 – Ju 52/3mg4e on static display at the Traditionsgemeinschaft Lufttransport Wunstorf in Wunstorf, Lower Saxony.
- 6821 – Ju 52/3mg4e on static display at the Technik Museum Speyer in Speyer, Rhineland-Palatinate.
- 130714 – Ju 52/3mg8e on display at Lufthansa Group Hangar One in Frankfurt am Main. It was previously owned by aviation author Martin Caidin and has been refitted with Pratt & Whitney R-1340 engines.
- T.2B-108 – Ju 52/3mte on static display at the Deutsches Technikmuseum in Berlin.
- T.2B-127 – CASA 352L on static display at Flugausstellung Peter Junior in Hermeskeil, Rhineland-Palatinate.
- T.2B-140 – CASA 352L on static display at the Technik Museum Sinsheim in Sinsheim, Baden-Württemberg.
- T.2B-144 – CASA 352L on static display at the Visitors Park at Munich Airport in Munich, Bavaria.
- T.2B-209 – CASA 352L on static display at the Technik Museum Speyer in Speyer.
- T.2B-257 – CASA 352L on static display at the Technik Museum Sinsheim in Sinsheim.

Norway

- 6306 – Ju 52/3mg3e on static display at the Norwegian Aviation Museum in Bodø, Nordland.
- 6657 – Ju 52/3mg4e on static display at the Norwegian Armed Forces Aircraft Collection in Gardermoen, Viken.
- 6791 - Ju 52/3m Stored at Flyhistorisk Museum, Sola near Stavanger

Poland

- 48 – AAC.1 on static display at the Polish Aviation Museum in Kraków.

Portugal

- 6304 – Ju 52/3mg3e on static display at the Museu do Ar in Sintra, Lisbon.

Serbia

- 7208 – AAC.1 on static display at the Aeronautical Museum Belgrade in Surčin, Belgrade.

Spain

- T.2B-211 – CASA 352L on static display at the Museo del Aire in Cuatro Vientos, Madrid.
- T.2B-246 – CASA 352L on static display at Torrejon Air Base in Torrejón de Ardoz, Madrid.
- T.2B-254 – CASA 352L on static display at the Museo del Aire in Cuatro Vientos, Madrid.

Sweden

- T.2B-142 – CASA 352L on static display at the Svedinos Bil- och Flygmuseum in Ugglarp, Halland.

United Kingdom

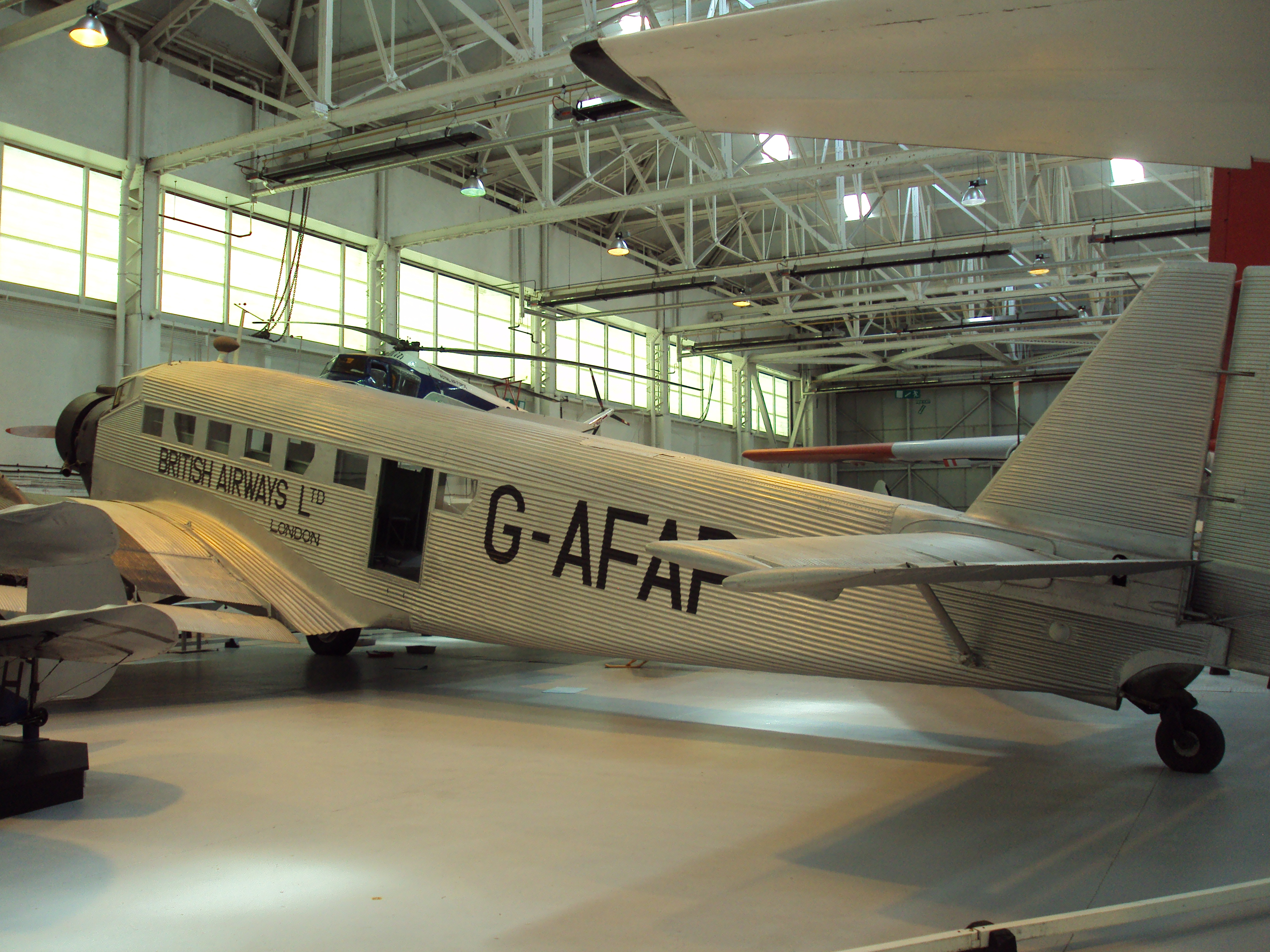
CASA 352L on display at RAF Museum Cosford

- T.2B-272 – CASA 352L on static display at the Kent Battle of Britain Museum in Hawkinge, Kent.

United States

- T.2B-244 – CASA 352L in storage at the National Museum of the United States Air Force in Dayton, Ohio. The aircraft was donated to the museum by the Spanish government in 1971.
- T.2B-255 – CASA 352L on static display at the Steven F. Udvar-Hazy Center of the National Air and Space Museum in Chantilly, Virginia.
- T.2B-262 – CASA 352L in storage at the Fantasy of Flight in Polk City, Florida.

=== Under restoration ===
Switzerland

- A-701 – Ju 52/3mg4e under restoration to airworthy with Ju-Air in Dübendorf, Zürich.
- A-703 – Ju 52/3mg4e under restoration to airworthy with Ju-Air in Dübendorf, Zürich.
- T.2B-165 – CASA 352L under restoration to airworthy with Ju-Air in Dübendorf, Zürich. It was previously on public display at Düsseldorf Airport as D-CIAK.

== Specifications (Junkers Ju 52/3m g3e) ==
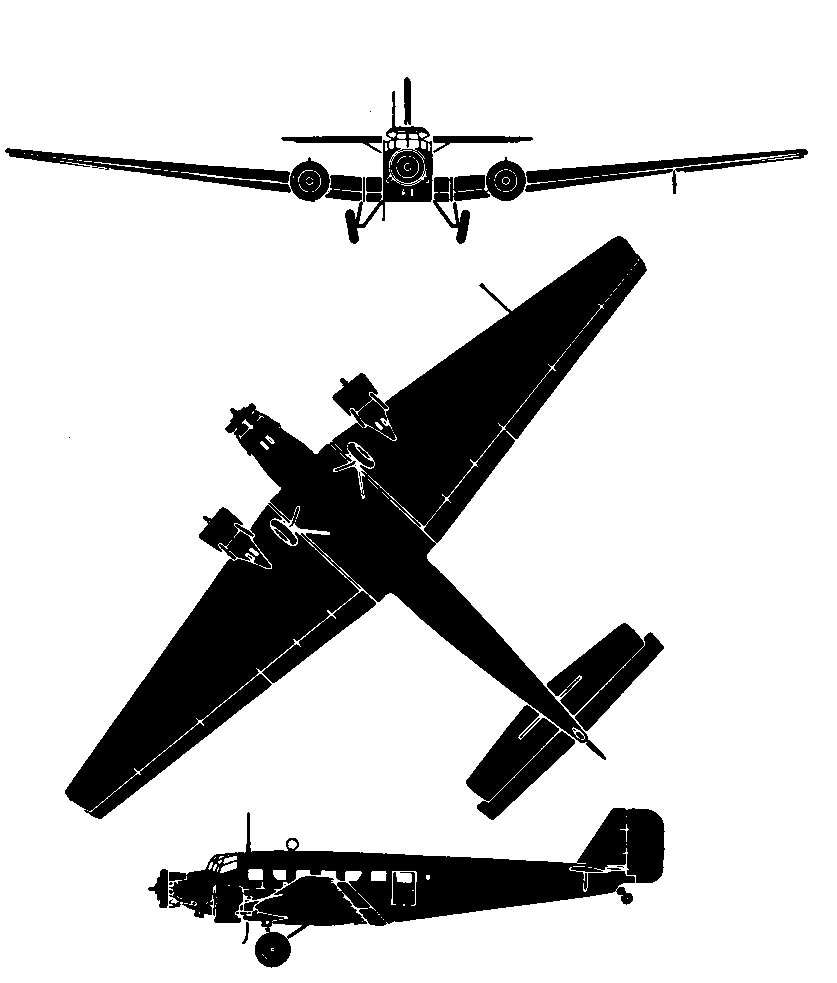
CASA 352-L 3-view drawing

Data from The Warplanes of the Third Reich, Aircraft Profile No. 177: The Junkers Ju 52 Series

General characteristics

- Crew: Two
- Capacity: 17 passengers
- Length: 19 m (62 ft)
- Wingspan: 29 m (96 ft)
- Height: 5.5 m (18.2 ft)
- Wing area: 110.50 m^{2} (1,189.4 sq ft)
- Empty weight: 5,720 kg (12,610 lb)
- Gross weight: 9,500 kg (20,944 lb)
- Max takeoff weight: 10,500 kg (23,146 lb)
- Powerplant: 3 × BMW 132A-3 9-cylinder air-cooled radial piston engines, 510 kW (680 hp) each for take-off (510 kW (690 PS))
- Propellers: 2-bladed fixed-pitch propeller

Performance

- Maximum speed: 265.5 km/h (165.0 mph, 143.4 kn) at sea level

276.8 km/h (172.0 mph; 149.5 kn) at 900 m (3,000 ft)

- Cruise speed: 246 km/h (153 mph, 133 kn) maximum continuous at 910 m (3,000 ft)

209 km/h (130 mph; 113 kn) economical cruise

- Range: 1,000 km (620 mi, 540 nmi)
- Service ceiling: 5,900 m (19,360 ft)
- Rate of climb: 3.9 m/s (770 ft/min)
- Time to altitude: 3,000 m (9,800 ft) in 17 minutes 30 seconds
- Wing loading: 83.35 kg/m^{2} (17.07 lb/sq ft)
- Power/mass: 7.95 kg/kW

Armament

- Guns: * 1 × 7.92 mm (0.312 in) MG 15 machine gun or 13 mm (0.51 in) MG 131 machine gun in a dorsal position
- 1 × 7.92 mm (0.312 in) MG 15 machine gun in a semi-retractable dustbin turret
- Bombs: up to 500 kg (1,100 lb) of bombs

== See also ==
Related development

- Junkers Ju 252
- Junkers Ju 352

Aircraft of comparable role, configuration, and era

- Dewoitine D.338
- Douglas DC-3/C-47
- Fokker F.VII
- Ford Trimotor
- Savoia-Marchetti SM.81
- Stout 3-AT
- Savoia-Marchetti S.73

Related lists

- List of aircraft of World War II

Other

- 2018 Ju-Air Junkers Ju 52 crash
