= Junkers Ju 52 WkNr 130714 =

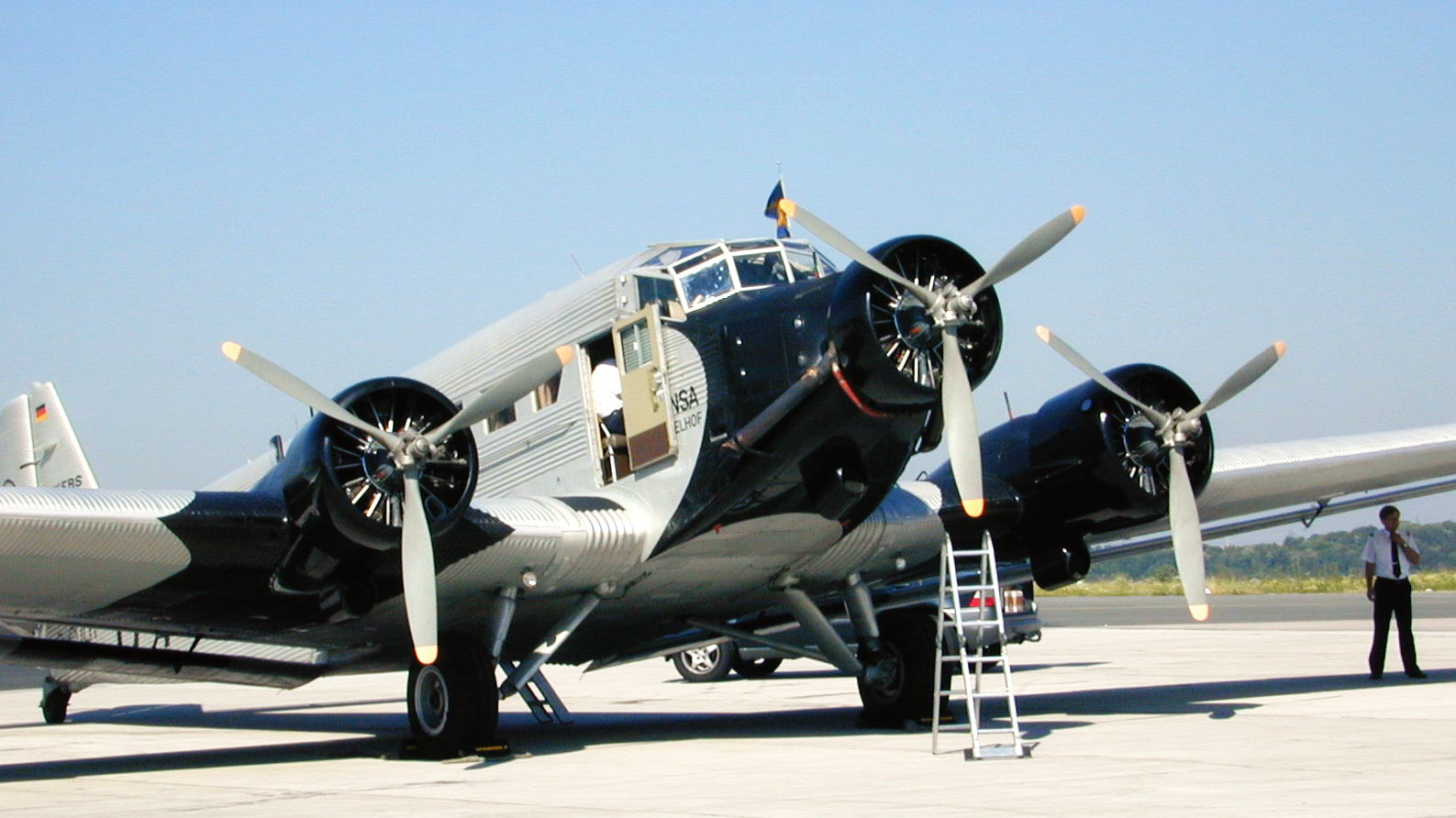
The Lufthansa Ju 52/3m D-AQUI "Tempelhof"

D-AQUI, at one point the oldest airworthy Ju 52 in existence, was produced in 1936, with serial number 5489 and given the registration D-AQUI Fritz Simon. It was sold to Norwegian airline DNL (Det Norske Luftfartselskap A/S) in 1936 and registered as LN-DAH Falken, only to be confiscated by the German Army in 1940 when Norway was invaded. At this time it was once again given the old D-AQUI registration, but renamed Kurt Wintgens.

After the war, the Allies returned it to its former owners, DNL. In 1947 it was rebuilt as a Ju 52/3mg8e using the fuselage of Werk Nummer 130714. It was re-registered as LN-KAF Askeladden and served on the Norwegian coastal route from Tromsø to Kirkenes for SAS from February 1948 until 1956.

After sitting parked for a year at Oslo Airport, Fornebu, it was sold to Coronel Jacinto Ruales from TAO (Transportes Aéreos Orientales) in Ecuador, with new registration HB-ABS Amazonas issued in July 1957. It was shipped to Ecuador in wooden crates. When it arrived the wings and tail still wore the distinctive blue lettered SAS livery. It was reassembled at the Ecuadorean Air Force Military Base in Salinas, Guayas in the summer of 1957 under the direction of former Lufthansa pilot Christoph Drexel. TAO flew the plane in scheduled airline service from Quito at 10,000 feet elevation to settlements in the foothills of the Andes in the Amazonian region (500 to 1000 feet altitude) of Ecuador with captain Gonzalo Ruales usually flying the left seat. The plane routinely cleared mountain passes at 13,000 feet of altitude, landing on unimproved landing strips often claimed from the shores of tributaries of the Amazon.

It was taken out of service in 1963 as gathering momentum of oil exploration in the Amazonian region began to demand aircraft of increased lift capacity. The aircraft remained parked at Quito Airport for six years. It was bought by a former United States Air Force pilot, Lester Weaver for $52,500. It was given registry N130LV, but American authorities certified it as "experimental".

In 1975, American writer Martin Caidin bought it for $52,500. It was christened Iron Annie, registration N52JU. It saw extensive use at air shows, and was based at Gainesville, Florida. Caidin set a number of records with Iron Annie, among them the shortest takeoff ever made with a Ju 52/3m and the world record for the most wing-walkers on one aeroplane at the same time.

Lufthansa acquired it in December 1984: It was flown to Hamburg via Greenland, Iceland and England, the only west to east Atlantic flight of an Ju 52. After a year it took to the air again, with the official registration painted under the tail as D-CDLH. The old registration D-AQUI is painted on the wings. The aircraft's name is now Tempelhof.

Damage discovered during routine inspections at the end of 2015 led to Lufthansa temporarily grounding Tempelhof until summer 2016. The aircraft eventually returned to service in early 2017 but at the beginning of 2019 Lufthansa announced that the airline had withdrawn financial support for passenger operations and the aircraft would now only be available for airshows. According to later reports the wings were removed from the aircraft and it was transported by road to Munich with plans that it would become a permanent static exhibit in a museum. However, in 2020 it was transferred to the Quax Association at Paderborn/Lippstadt airport for restoration.

Since August 2025 it is an exhibit at the Lufthansa Group Hangar One visitor and conference center in Frankfurt am Main.

== Extneral links ==
- Lufthansa Group: Ju 52 in Hangar One
