= Supermarine Spitfire =

British single-seat WWII fighter aircraft

Spitfire
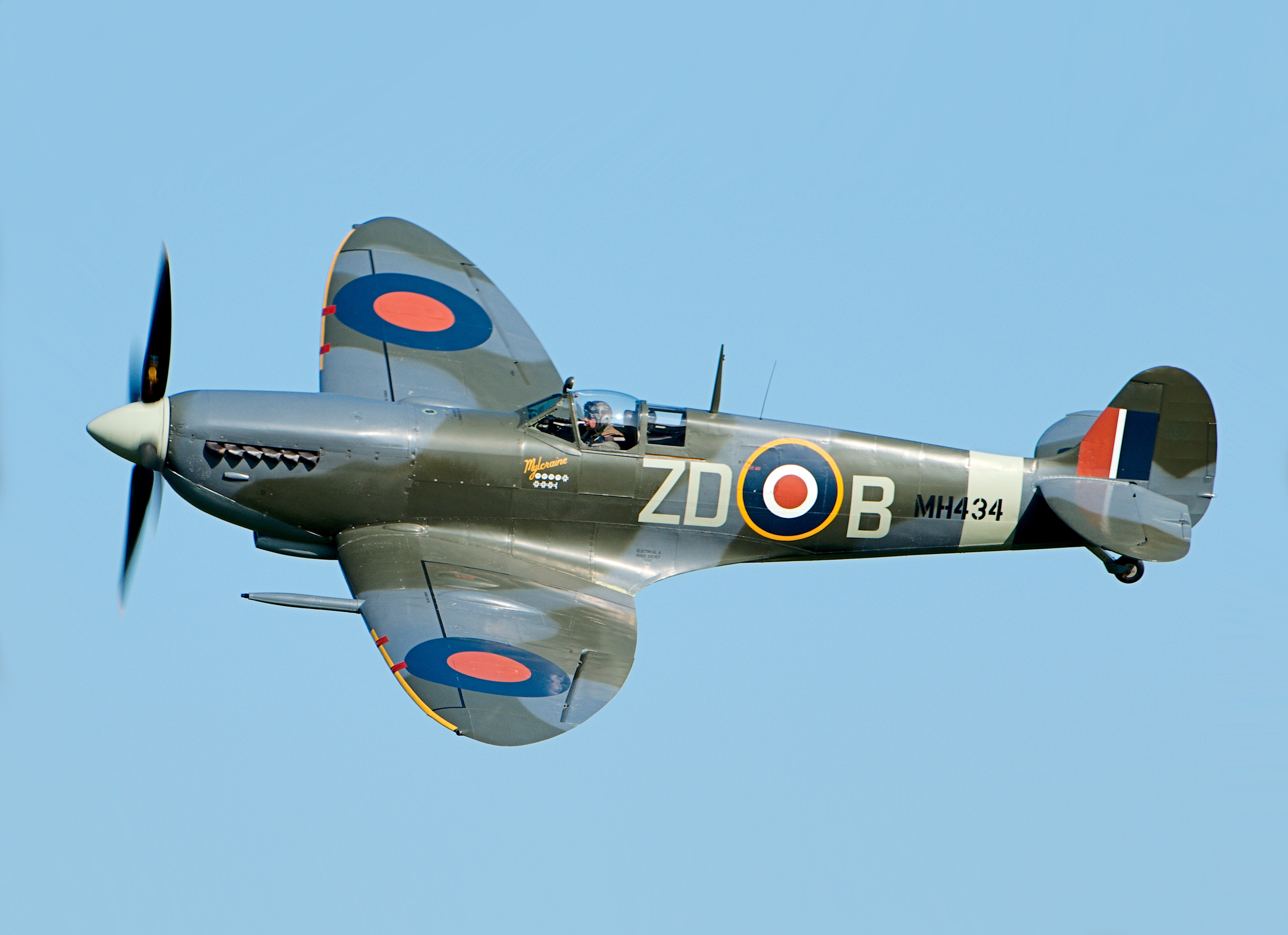
- Spitfire LF Mk IX, MH434 in 2018 in the markings of its original unit No. 222 Squadron RAF

General information
- Type: Fighter / Interceptor aircraft
- National origin: United Kingdom
- Manufacturer: Supermarine
- Designer: R. J. Mitchell
- Primary users: Royal Air Force: Royal Canadian Air Force; Free French Air Force; United States Army Air Forces
- Number built: More than 20,351

History
- Manufactured: 1938–1948
- Introduction date: 4 August 1938
- First flight: 5 March 1936
- Variants: Supermarine Spitfire (Griffon-powered variants); Supermarine Spitfire (early Merlin-powered variants); Supermarine Spitfire (late Merlin-powered variants); Supermarine Seafire
- Developed into: Supermarine Spiteful

Audio recording of Spitfire fly-past at the 2011 family day at RAF Halton, Buckinghamshire

Supermarine Spitfire G-AWGB landing at Biggin Hill Airport, June 2024

The Supermarine Spitfire is a British single-seat fighter aircraft that was used by the Royal Air Force and other Allied countries before, during, and after World War II. It was the only British fighter produced continuously throughout the war. The Spitfire was a short-range, high-performance interceptor aircraft designed by R. J. Mitchell, chief designer at Supermarine Aviation Works, which operated as a subsidiary of Vickers-Armstrong from 1928. Mitchell modified the Spitfire's distinctive elliptical wing (designed by Beverley Shenstone) with innovative sunken rivets to have the thinnest possible cross-section, achieving a potential top speed greater than that of several contemporary fighter aircraft, including the Hawker Hurricane. Mitchell continued to refine the design until his death from cancer in 1937, whereupon his colleague Joseph Smith took over as chief designer.

Smith oversaw the Spitfire's development through many variants, from the Mk 1 to the Rolls-Royce Griffon-engined Mk 24, using several wing configurations and guns. The original airframe was designed to be powered by a Rolls-Royce Merlin engine producing 1,030 hp (768 kW). It was strong enough and adaptable enough to use increasingly powerful Merlins, and in later marks, Rolls-Royce Griffon engines producing up to 2,340 hp (1,745 kW). As a result, the Spitfire's performance and capabilities improved over the course of its service life.

During the Battle of Britain (July–October 1940), the more numerous Hurricane flew more sorties resisting the Luftwaffe, but the Spitfire captured the public's imagination, in part because the Spitfire was generally a better fighter aircraft than the Hurricane. Spitfire units had a lower attrition rate and a higher victory-to-loss ratio than Hurricanes, most likely due to the Spitfire's higher performance. During the battle, Spitfires generally engaged Luftwaffe fighters—mainly Messerschmitt Bf 109E-series aircraft—which were a close match for them.

After the Battle of Britain, the Spitfire superseded the Hurricane as the principal aircraft of RAF Fighter Command, and it was used in the European, Mediterranean, Pacific, and South-East Asian theatres.

Much loved by its pilots, the Spitfire operated in several roles, including interceptor, photo-reconnaissance, fighter-bomber, and trainer, and it continued to do so until the 1950s. The Seafire was an aircraft carrier-based adaptation of the Spitfire, used in the Fleet Air Arm from 1942 until the mid-1950s. The Spitfire remains popular among enthusiasts. Approximately 60 remain airworthy as of 2025, and many more are static exhibits in aviation museums throughout the world. Five airworthy aircraft are also part of the Battle of Britain Memorial Flight, which is a squadron in the RAF. The BBMF is used at air shows.

== Development and production ==
=== Origins ===
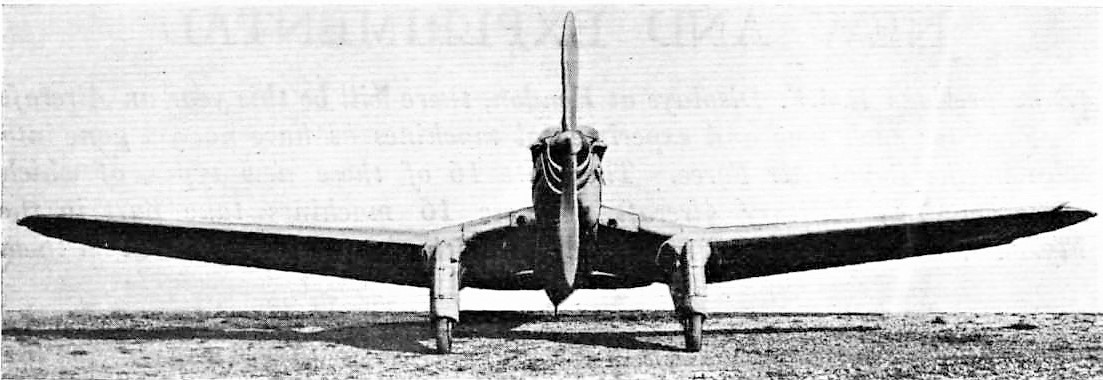
Supermarine Type 224

In 1931, the Air Ministry released specification F7/30, calling for a modern fighter capable of a flying speed of 250 mph (400 km/h) to replace the Gloster Gauntlet biplane. R. J. Mitchell designed the Supermarine Type 224 to fill this role in competition with the Blackburn F.3 and Westland F.7/30 and privately funded designs from Gloster. The 224 was an open-cockpit monoplane with bulky gull wings and a large, fixed, spatted undercarriage powered by the 600-horsepower (450 kW), evaporatively cooled Rolls-Royce Goshawk engine. It made its first flight in February 1934. Of the seven designs tendered to F7/30, the Gloster Gladiator biplane was accepted for service.

The Type 224 was a big disappointment to Mitchell and his design team, who immediately embarked on a series of "cleaned-up" designs, using their experience with the Schneider Trophy seaplanes as a starting point. This led to the Type 300, with retractable undercarriage and a wingspan reduced by 6 ft (1.8 m). This design was submitted to the Air Ministry in July 1934, but was not accepted. It then went through a series of changes, including the incorporation of an enclosed cockpit, oxygen-breathing apparatus, smaller and thinner wings, and the newly developed, more powerful Rolls-Royce PV XII V-12 engine, (Note: PV coming from "Private Venture"; the engine was developed at Rolls Royce without government funding) which was later named the "Merlin". In November 1934, Mitchell, with the backing of Supermarine's owner Vickers-Armstrong, started detailed design work on this refined version of the Type 300.

On 1 December 1934, the Air Ministry issued contract AM 361140/34, providing £10,000 for the construction of Mitchell's improved Type 300 design. In April 1935 Ralph Sorley spoke to Mitchell about the new specification F10/35 which called for armament of at least six and preferably eight guns while at the same time removing bomb carry requirement and reducing fuel capacity. Mitchell foresaw no problem adding the guns and welcomed the reduction which would reduce weight. A specification for an eight-gun fighter, F5/34 had come from a recommendation by Squadron Leader Ralph Sorley of the Operational Requirements section at the Air Ministry. In the redesign the change was made from Vickers machine guns to .303 in (7.7 mm) Brownings), and the fuel tankage dropped to 75 gallons from 94.

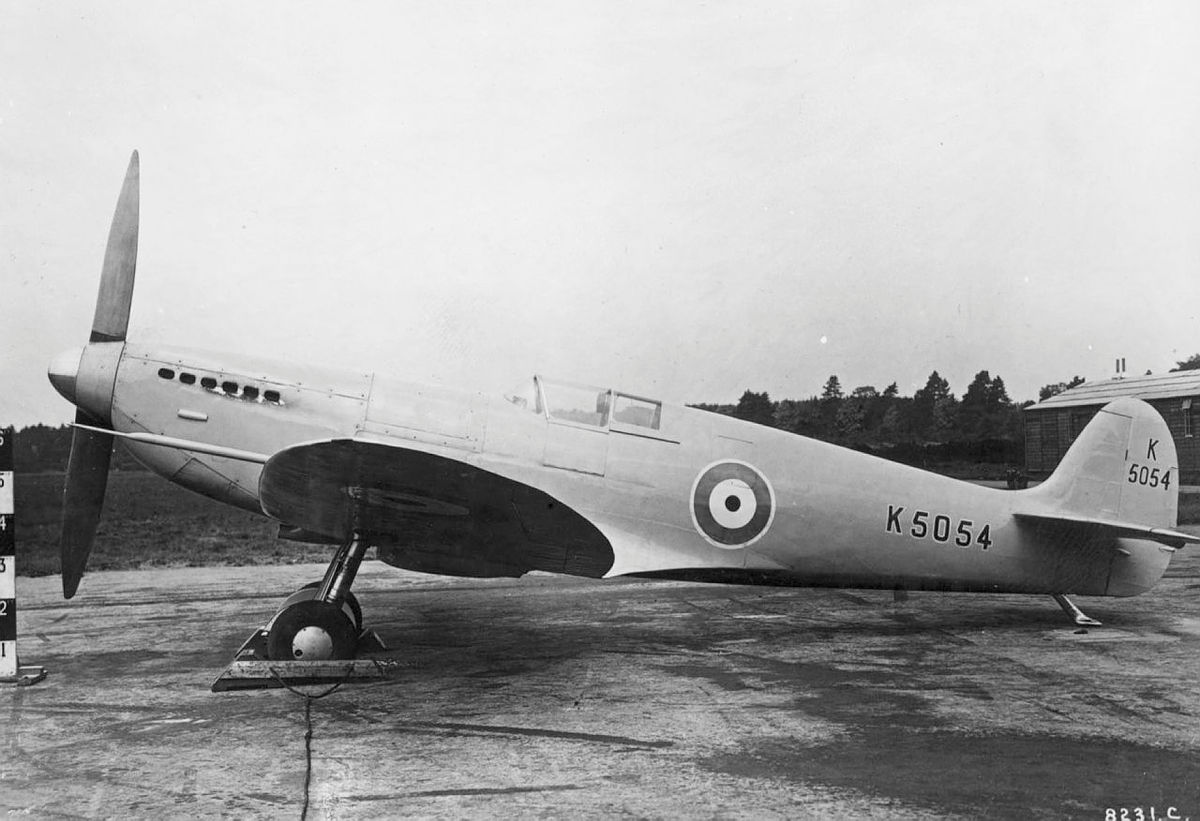
Spitfire prototype K5054

On 5 March 1936, (Note: For many years, considerable debate occurred over the date of the first flight being 5 or 6 March. Many of Supermarine's records from this era were destroyed during a bombing raid in 1940, and none of the surviving documents seemed to pin this down. This matter was almost conclusively answered in 1985 by aviation author Alfred Price, who received an account sheet with a handwritten note updating a line from "Not yet flown" to "Flew 5 Mar 36". See Spitfire: A Complete Fighting History, 1991, pp. 165–166.) the prototype (K5054), fitted with a fine-pitch propeller to give more power for take-off, took off on its first flight from Eastleigh Aerodrome. At the controls was Captain Joseph "Mutt" Summers, chief test pilot for Vickers, who is quoted as having said, "don't touch anything" on landing. (Note: Although this is often perceived as Summers implying the Spitfire was flawless, this is not the case. What he meant was that he wanted nothing touched, especially the control settings, until he had consulted with Mitchell and the design team and suggested some improvements.) This eight-minute flight came four months after the maiden flight of the contemporary Hurricane.

K5054 was fitted with a new propeller, and Summers flew the aircraft on 10 March 1936; during this flight, the undercarriage was retracted for the first time. After the fourth flight, a new engine was fitted, and Summers left the test flying to his assistants, Jeffrey Quill and George Pickering. They soon discovered that the Spitfire (Note: The Air Ministry submitted a list of possible names to Vickers-Armstrong for the new aircraft, then known as the Type 300. One of these was the improbable Shrew. The name Spitfire was suggested by Sir Robert McLean, director of Vickers-Armstrongs at the time, who called his spirited elder daughter Annie Penrose "a little spitfire". The word is recorded since at least 1801 and refers to a fiery, ferocious type of person; at the time, it usually meant a girl or woman of that temperament. Previously, the name had been used unofficially for Mitchell's earlier F7/30 Type 224 design. Mitchell is reported to have said it was "just the sort of bloody silly name they would choose".) was a very capable aircraft, but not perfect. The rudder was oversensitive, and the top speed was just 330 mph (528 km/h), little faster than Sydney Camm's new Merlin-powered Hurricane. A new and better-shaped, two-bladed, wooden propeller allowed the Spitfire to reach 348 mph (557 km/h) in level flight in mid-May, when Summers flew K5054 to RAF Martlesham Heath and handed the aircraft over to Squadron Leader Anderson of the Aeroplane & Armament Experimental Establishment (A&AEE). Here, Flight Lieutenant Humphrey Edwardes-Jones took over the prototype for the RAF. He had been given orders to fly the aircraft and then to make his report to the Air Ministry on landing. Edwardes-Jones' report was positive; his only request was that the Spitfire be equipped with an undercarriage position indicator. A week later, on 3 June 1936, the Air Ministry placed an order for 310 Spitfires, at a cost of £1,395,000. before the A&AEE had issued any formal report. Interim reports were later issued on a piecemeal basis.

=== Initial production ===
The British public first saw the Spitfire at the RAF Hendon air display on Saturday 27 June 1936. Although full-scale production was supposed to begin immediately, numerous problems could not be overcome for some time, and the first production Spitfire, K9787, did not roll off the Woolston, Southampton assembly line until mid-1938.

In February 1936, the director of Vickers-Armstrong's, Sir Robert MacLean guaranteed production of five aircraft a week, beginning 15 months after an order was placed. On 3 June 1936, the Air Ministry placed an order for 310 aircraft. Full-scale production of the Spitfire began at Supermarine's facility in Woolston, but the order clearly could not be completed in the 15 months promised. Supermarine was a small company, already busy building Walrus and Stranraer flying boats, and Vickers was busy building Wellington bombers. The initial solution was to subcontract the work. Although outside contractors were supposed to be involved in manufacturing many important Spitfire components, especially the wings, Vickers-Armstrong's (the parent company) was reluctant to see the Spitfire being manufactured by outside concerns, and was slow to release the necessary blueprints and subcomponents.

As a result of the delays in getting the Spitfire into full production, the Air Ministry put forward a plan that its production be stopped after the initial order for 310, after which Supermarine would build Bristol Beaufighters. The managements of Supermarine and Vickers were able to convince the Air Ministry that production problems could be overcome, and a further order was placed for 200 Spitfires on 24 March 1938. The two orders covered the K, L, and N prefix serial numbers.

The first production Spitfire came off the assembly line in mid-1938 and was flown by Jeffrey Quill on 15 May 1938, almost 24 months after the initial order. The final cost of the first 310 aircraft, after delays and increased programme costs, came to £1,870,242 or £1,533 more per aircraft than originally estimated. A production aircraft cost about £9,500. The most expensive components were the hand-fabricated and finished fuselage at roughly £2,500, then the Rolls-Royce Merlin engine at £2,000, followed by the wings at £1,800 a pair, guns and undercarriage, both at £800 each, and the propeller at £350.

=== Manufacturing at Castle Bromwich, Birmingham ===
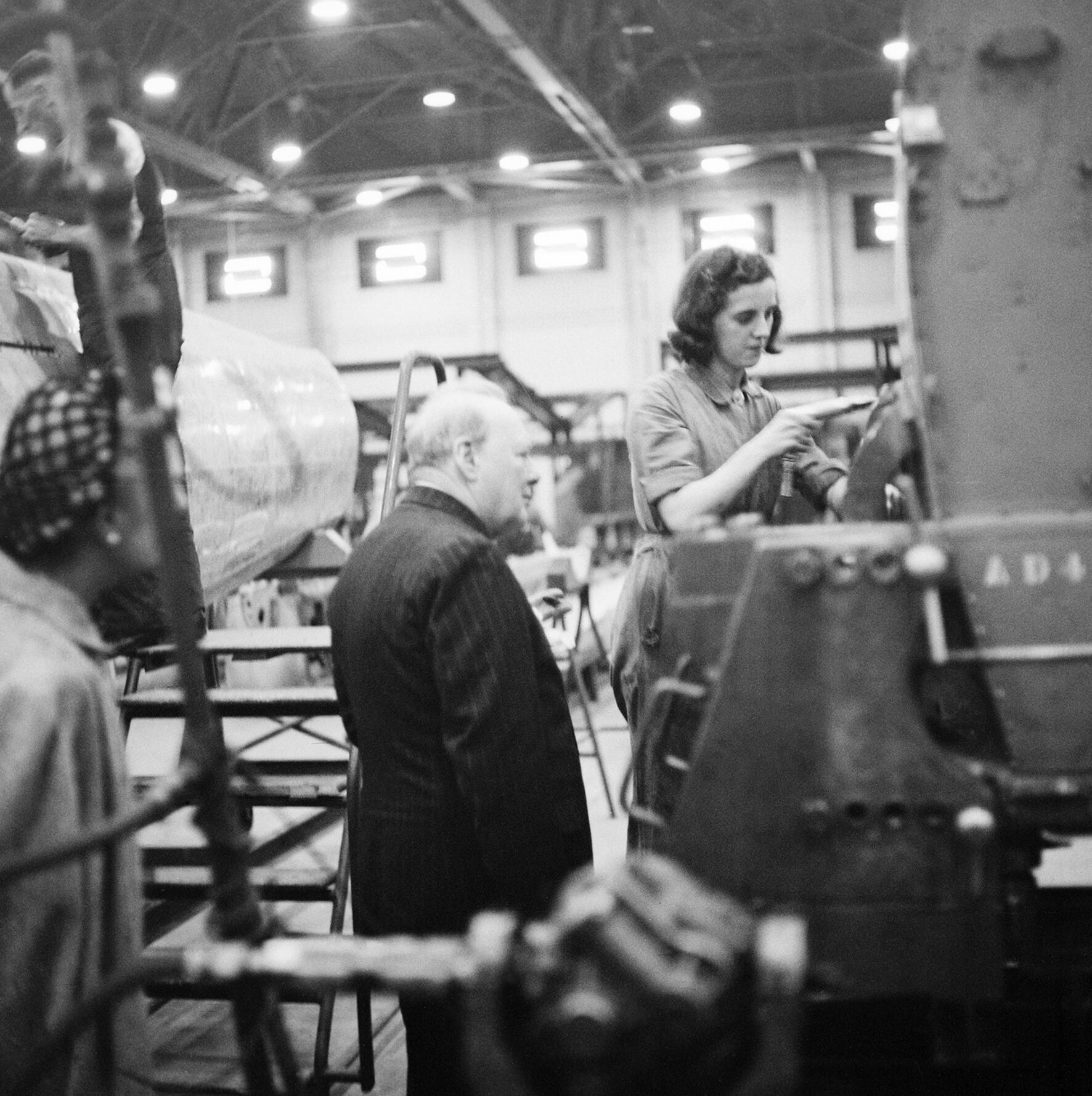
Churchill watches a riveter work on a Spitfire at the Castle Bromwich factory in 1941

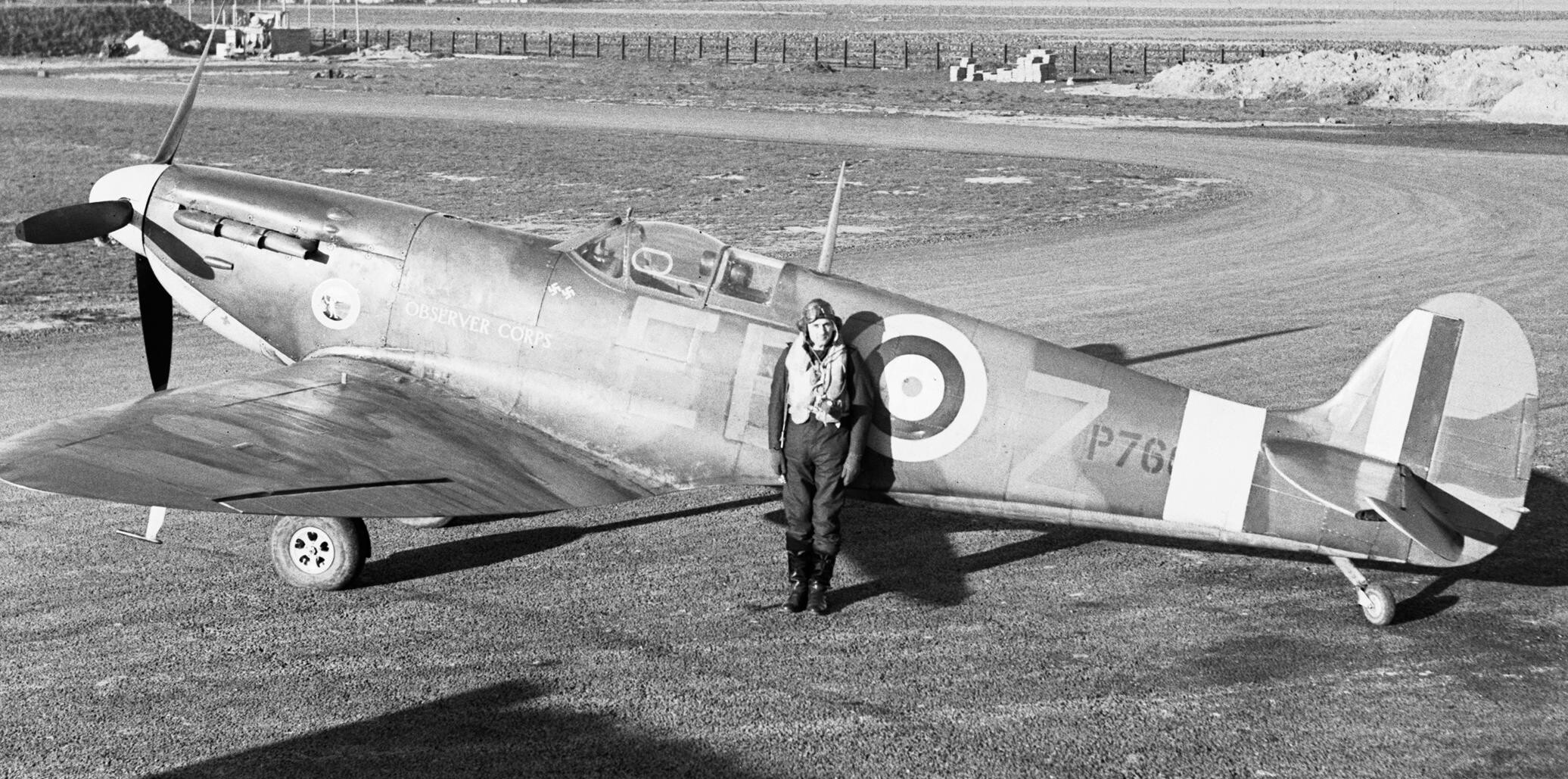
Spitfire Mk IIA, P7666, EB-Z, Royal Observer Corps, was built at Castle Bromwich, and delivered to 41 Squadron on 23 November 1940. (Note: The pilot standing in front of the aircraft is prewar Olympic hurdler, Sqn. Ldr. Donald O. Finlay, the commanding officer of 41 Squadron from September 1940 to August 1941, who adopted the aircraft as his personal mount. The same day P7666 was delivered to the squadron, 23 November 1940, Finlay destroyed a Bf 109 on his first operational sortie in the aircraft.)

In 1935, the Air Ministry approached Morris Motors Limited to ask how quickly their Cowley plant could be turned to aircraft production. In 1936, this informal request for major manufacturing facilities was replaced by a formal scheme, known as the shadow factory plan, to boost British aircraft production capacity under the leadership of Herbert Austin. He was given the task of building nine new factories, and to supplement the British car-manufacturing industry by either adding to overall capacity or increasing the potential for reorganisation to produce aircraft and their engines.

In 1938, construction began on the Castle Bromwich Aircraft Factory (CBAF), next to the aerodrome, and the installation of the most modern machine tools then available began two months after work started on the site. Although Morris Motors, under Lord Nuffield, who was an expert in mass motor-vehicle construction, managed and equipped the factory, it was funded by the government. By the beginning of 1939, the factory's original estimated cost of £2,000,000 had more than doubled, and even as the first Spitfires were being built in June 1940, the factory was still incomplete, and suffering from personnel problems. The Spitfire's stressed-skin construction required precision engineering skills and techniques that were beyond the capabilities of the local labour force, and some time was required to retrain them. Difficulties arose with management, who ignored Supermarine's tooling and drawings in favour of their own, and the workforce continually threatened strikes or "slow downs" until their demands for higher wages were met.

In spite of promises that the factory would be producing 60 per week starting in April, by May 1940, Castle Bromwich had not yet built its first Spitfire. On 17 May, Minister of Aircraft Production Lord Beaverbrook telephoned Lord Nuffield and manoeuvred him into handing over control of the Castle Bromwich plant to his ministry. Beaverbrook immediately sent in experienced management staff and workers from Supermarine, and gave control of the factory to Vickers-Armstrong's. Although resolving the problems took time, in June 1940, 10 Mk IIs were built; 23 rolled out in July, 37 in August, and 56 in September. By the time production ended at Castle Bromwich in June 1945, a total of 12,129 Spitfires, comprising 921 Mk IIs, 4,489 Mk Vs, 5,665 Mk IXs, and 1,054 Mk XVIs had been built.

=== Production dispersal ===
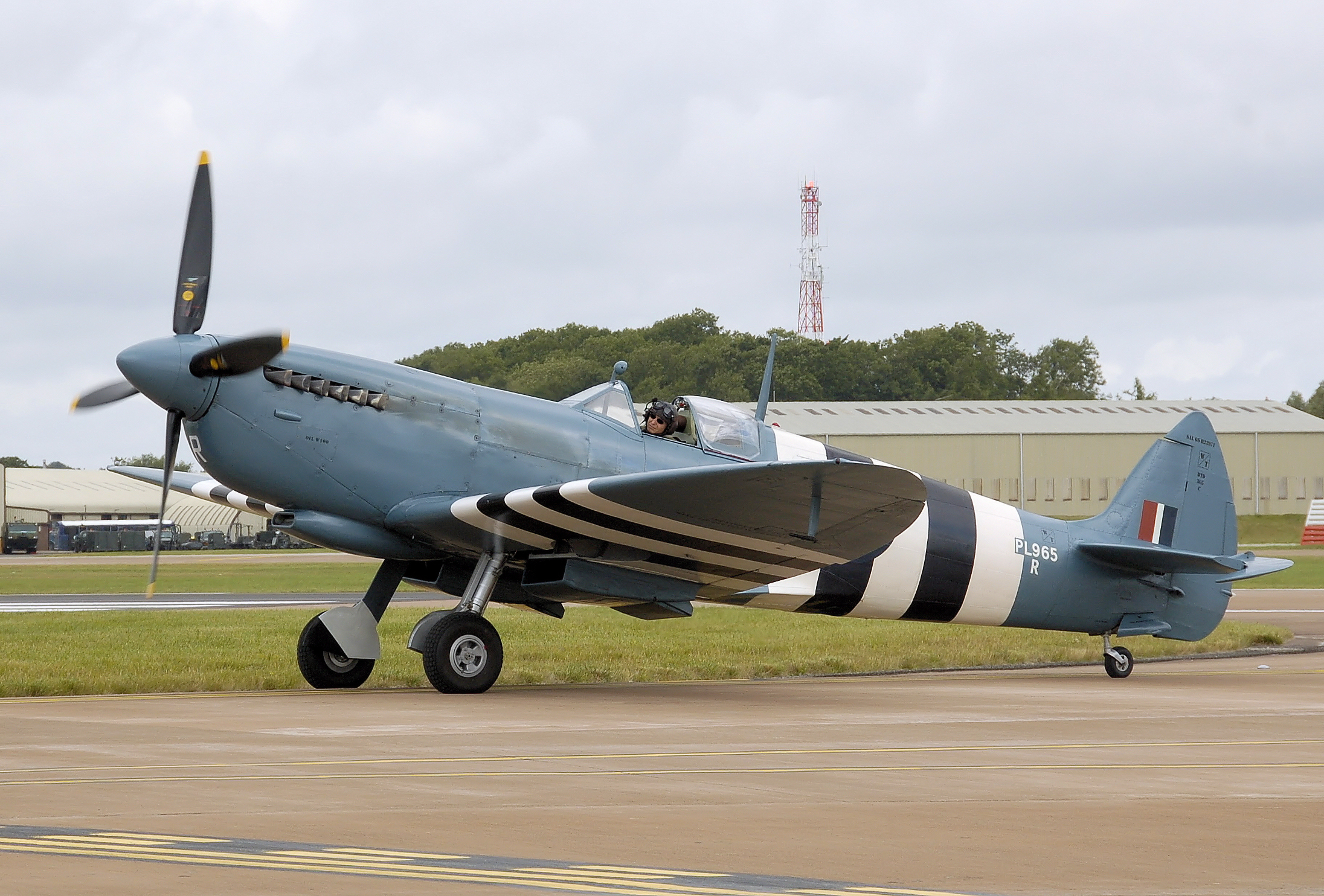
This Spitfire PR Mk XI (PL965) was built at RAF Aldermaston in southern England.

During the Battle of Britain, the Luftwaffe made concerted efforts to destroy the main manufacturing plants at Woolston and Itchen, near Southampton. The first bombing raid, which missed the factories, came on 23 August 1940. Over the next month, other raids were mounted, until, on 26 September 1940, both factories were destroyed, with 92 people killed and a large number injured. Most of the casualties were experienced aircraft-production workers.

Fortunately for the future of the Spitfire, many of the production jigs and machine tools had already been relocated by 20 September, and steps were being taken to disperse production to small facilities throughout the Southampton area. To this end, the British government requisitioned the likes of Vincent's Garage in Station Square, Reading, which later specialised in manufacturing Spitfire fuselages, and Anna Valley Motors, Salisbury, which was to become the sole producer of the wing leading-edge fuel tanks for photo-reconnaissance Spitfires.

A purpose-built works, specialising in manufacturing fuselages and installing engines, was built at Star Road, Caversham in Reading. The drawing office in which all Spitfire designs were drafted was moved to Hursley Park, near Winchester.

Four towns and their satellite airfields were chosen to be the focal points for these workshops: Southampton's Eastleigh Airport; Salisbury and the High Post and Chattis Hill (Note: A "Spitfire Lane" can be found on the road between Salisbury and Andover leading to the Chattis Hill aerodrome.) aerodromes; Trowbridge and RAF Keevil; and Reading's Henley and Aldermaston aerodromes. Completed Spitfires were delivered to the airfields on Commer "Queen Mary" low-loader trailers, there to be fully assembled, tested, then passed on to the RAF.

=== Flight testing ===
All production aircraft were flight tested before delivery. During the Second World War, Jeffrey Quill was Vickers Supermarine's chief test pilot, in charge of flight testing all aircraft types built by Vickers Supermarine. He oversaw a group of 10 to 12 pilots responsible for testing all developmental and production Spitfires built by the company in the Southampton area. (Note: The test pilots were based at Highpost and flown by light aircraft to the other airfields.) Quill devised the standard testing procedures, which with variations for specific aircraft designs operated from 1938. Alex Henshaw, chief test pilot at Castle Bromwich from 1940, was placed in charge of testing all Spitfires built at that factory. He co-ordinated a team of 25 pilots and assessed all Spitfire developments. Between 1940 and 1946, Henshaw flew a total of 2,360 Spitfires and Seafires, more than 10% of total production. Henshaw wrote that he would climb at full throttle at 2,850 rpm to the rated altitude, then dive at full power and 3,000 rpm, and trim the plane to fly by itself at 460 mph (740 km/h). A production test usually consisted of an initial circuit of under 10 minutes, and a main flight of 20 to 30 minutes. He commented that the more powerful later versions were heavier and did not handle as well as the earlier ones, for example in a flick-roll.

When the last Spitfire rolled out in February 1948, a total of 20,351 examples of all variants had been built, including two-seat trainers, with some Spitfires remaining in service well into the 1950s. The Spitfire was the only British fighter aircraft to be in continuous production before, during, and after the Second World War.

== Design ==
=== Airframe ===
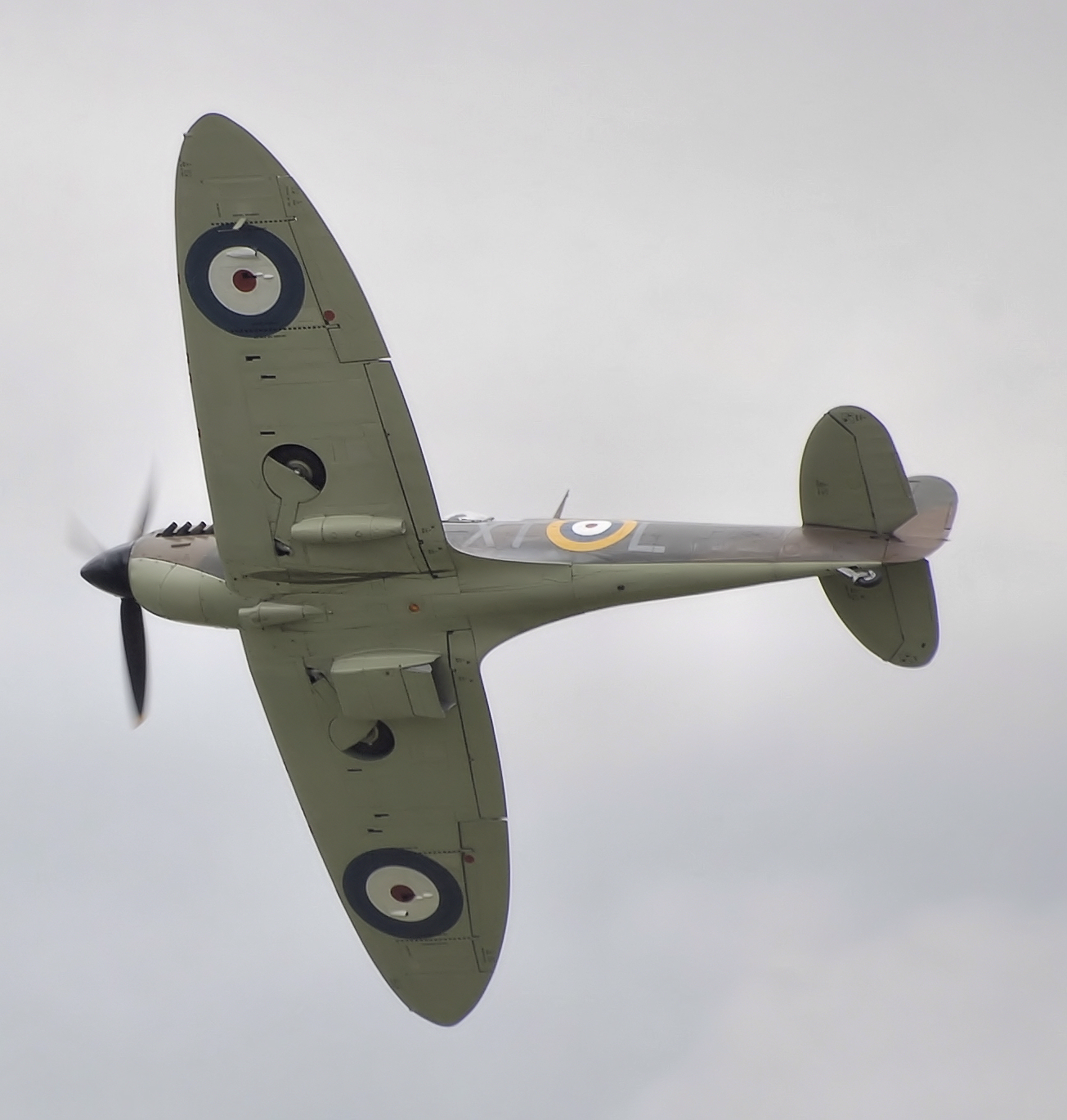
Spitfire Mk IIa P7350 of the BBMF is the only existing airworthy Spitfire that fought in the Battle of Britain.

In the mid-1930s, aviation design teams worldwide began developing a new generation of fighter aircraft. The French Dewoitine D.520 and the German Messerschmitt Bf 109, for example, were designed to take advantage of new techniques of monocoque construction, and the availability of new, high-powered, liquid-cooled, in-line aero engines. They also had refinements such as retractable undercarriages, fully enclosed cockpits, and low-drag, all-metal wings. These advances had been introduced on civil airliners years before, but were slow to be adopted by the military, who favoured the biplane's simplicity and manoeuvrability.

Mitchell's design aims were to create a well-balanced, high-performance fighter aircraft capable of fully exploiting the power of the Merlin engine, while being relatively easy to fly. At the time, with France as an ally, and Germany thought to be the most likely future opponent, no enemy fighters were expected to appear over Great Britain. German bombers would have to fly to the UK over the North Sea, and Germany did not have any single-engine fighters with the range to accompany them. To carry out the mission of home defence, the design was intended to allow the Spitfire to climb quickly to intercept enemy bombers.

The Spitfire's airframe was complex. The streamlined, semi-monocoque, duralumin-skinned fuselage had a number of compound curves built up over a skeleton of 19 formers, also known as frames. These started from frame number one, immediately behind the propeller unit, to the tail unit attachment frame. The first four frames supported the glycol header tank and engine cowlings. Frame five, to which the engine bearers were secured, supported the weight of the engine and its accessories. This was a strengthened double frame which also incorporated the fireproof bulkhead, and in later versions of the Spitfire, the oil tank. This frame also tied the four main fuselage longerons to the rest of the airframe. Behind the bulkhead were five U-shaped half-frames which accommodated the fuel tanks and cockpit. The rear fuselage started at the 11th frame, to which the pilot's seat and (later) armour plating were attached, and ended at the 19th, which was mounted at a slight forward angle just forward of the fin. Each of these nine frames was oval, reducing in size towards the tail, and incorporated several lightening holes to reduce their weight as much as possible without weakening them. The U-shaped frame 20 was the last frame of the fuselage proper and the frame to which the tail unit was attached. Frames 21, 22 and 23 formed the fin; frame 22 incorporated the tailwheel opening and frame 23 was the rudder post. Before being attached to the main fuselage, the tail unit frames were held in a jig and the eight horizontal tail formers were riveted to them.

A combination of 14 longitudinal stringers and four main longerons attached to the frames helped form a light but rigid structure to which sheets of alclad stressed skinning were attached. The fuselage plating was 24, 20, and 18 gauge, decreasing in order of thickness towards the tail, while the fin structure was completed using short longerons from frames 20 to 23, before being covered in 22 gauge plating.

The skin of the fuselage, wings, and tailplane was secured by dome-headed rivets, and in critical areas such as the wing forward of the main spar where an uninterrupted airflow was required, with flush rivets. From February 1943 flush riveting was used on the fuselage on all Spitfire variants. In some areas, such as at the rear of the wing and the lower tailplane skins, the top was riveted and the bottom fixed by brass screws which tapped into strips of spruce bolted to the lower ribs. The removable wing tips were made up of duralumin-skinned spruce formers.

At first, the ailerons, elevators, and rudder were fabric-covered, but once combat experience showed that fabric-covered ailerons were impossible to use at high speeds a light alloy replaced the fabric, enhancing control throughout the speed range.

=== Elliptical wing design ===
In 1934, Mitchell and the design staff decided to use a semi-elliptical wing shape to solve two conflicting requirements; the wing needed to be thin to avoid creating too much drag, but it had to be thick enough to house the retractable undercarriage, armament, and ammunition. An elliptical planform is the most efficient aerodynamic shape for an untwisted wing, leading to the lowest amount of induced drag. The ellipse was skewed so that the centre of pressure, which occurs at the quarter-chord position, aligned with the main spar, preventing the wings from twisting. Mitchell has sometimes been accused of copying the wing shape of the Günter brothers-designed Heinkel He 70, which first flew in 1932, but as Beverley Shenstone, the aerodynamicist on Mitchell's team, explained: "Our wing was much thinner and had quite a different section to that of the Heinkel. In any case, it would have been simply asking for trouble to have copied a wing shape from an aircraft designed for an entirely different purpose." (Note: Glancey notes that Rolls-Royce saw the potential of the He 70 as a flying test-bed for prototype engines, sending a team to Germany to buy one of the aircraft direct from Heinkel. The German government approved the deal, but only in return for a number of Rolls-Royce Kestrel engines. He also notes that Shenstone had worked with Ernst Heinkel in Germany.)

The elliptical wing was decided upon quite early on. Aerodynamically it was the best for our purpose because the induced drag caused in producing lift, was lowest when this shape was used: the ellipse was ... theoretically a perfection ... To reduce drag we wanted the lowest possible thickness-to-chord, consistent with the necessary strength. But near the root the wing had to be thick enough to accommodate the retracted undercarriages and the guns ... Mitchell was an intensely practical man ... The ellipse was simply the shape that allowed us the thinnest possible wing with room inside to carry the necessary structure and the things we wanted to cram in. And it looked nice.

— Beverly Shenstone

The wing section used was from the NACA 2200 series, which had been adapted to create a thickness-to-chord ratio of 13% at the root, reducing to 9.4% at the tip. A dihedral of 6° was adopted to give increased lateral stability.

A wing feature that contributed greatly to its success was an innovative spar boom design, made up of five square tubes that fitted into each other. As the wing thinned out along its span, the tubes were progressively cut away in a similar fashion to a leaf spring; two of these booms were linked together by an alloy web, creating a lightweight and very strong main spar. The undercarriage legs were attached to pivot points built into the inner, rear section of the main spar, and retracted outwards and slightly backwards into wells in the non-load-carrying wing structure. The resultant narrow undercarriage track was considered an acceptable compromise as this reduced the bending loads on the main-spar during landing.

Ahead of the spar, the thick-skinned leading edge of the wing formed a strong and rigid, D-shaped box, which took most of the wing loads. At the time the wing was designed, this D-shaped leading edge was intended to house steam condensers for the evaporative cooling system intended for the PV-XII. Constant problems with the evaporative system in the Goshawk led to the adoption of a cooling system which used 100% glycol. (Note: Starting with the Merlin XII fitted in Spitfire Mk IIs in late 1940 this was changed to a 70% water-30% glycol mix.) The radiators were housed in a new radiator-duct designed by Fredrick Meredith of the Royal Aircraft Establishment (RAE) at Farnborough, Hampshire. This used the cooling air to generate thrust, greatly reducing the net drag produced by the radiators. In turn, the leading-edge structure lost its function as a condenser, but it was later adapted to house integral fuel tanks of various sizes— a feature patented by Vickers-Supermarine in 1938. The airflow through the main radiator was controlled by pneumatic exit flaps. In early marks of the Spitfire (Mk I to Mk VI), the single flap was operated manually using a lever to the left of the pilot's seat. When the two-stage Merlin was introduced in the Spitfire Mk IX, the radiators were split to make room for an intercooler radiator; the radiator under the starboard wing was halved in size and the intercooler radiator housed alongside. Under the port wing, a new radiator fairing housed a square oil cooler alongside of the other half-radiator unit. The two radiator flaps were now operated automatically by a thermostat.

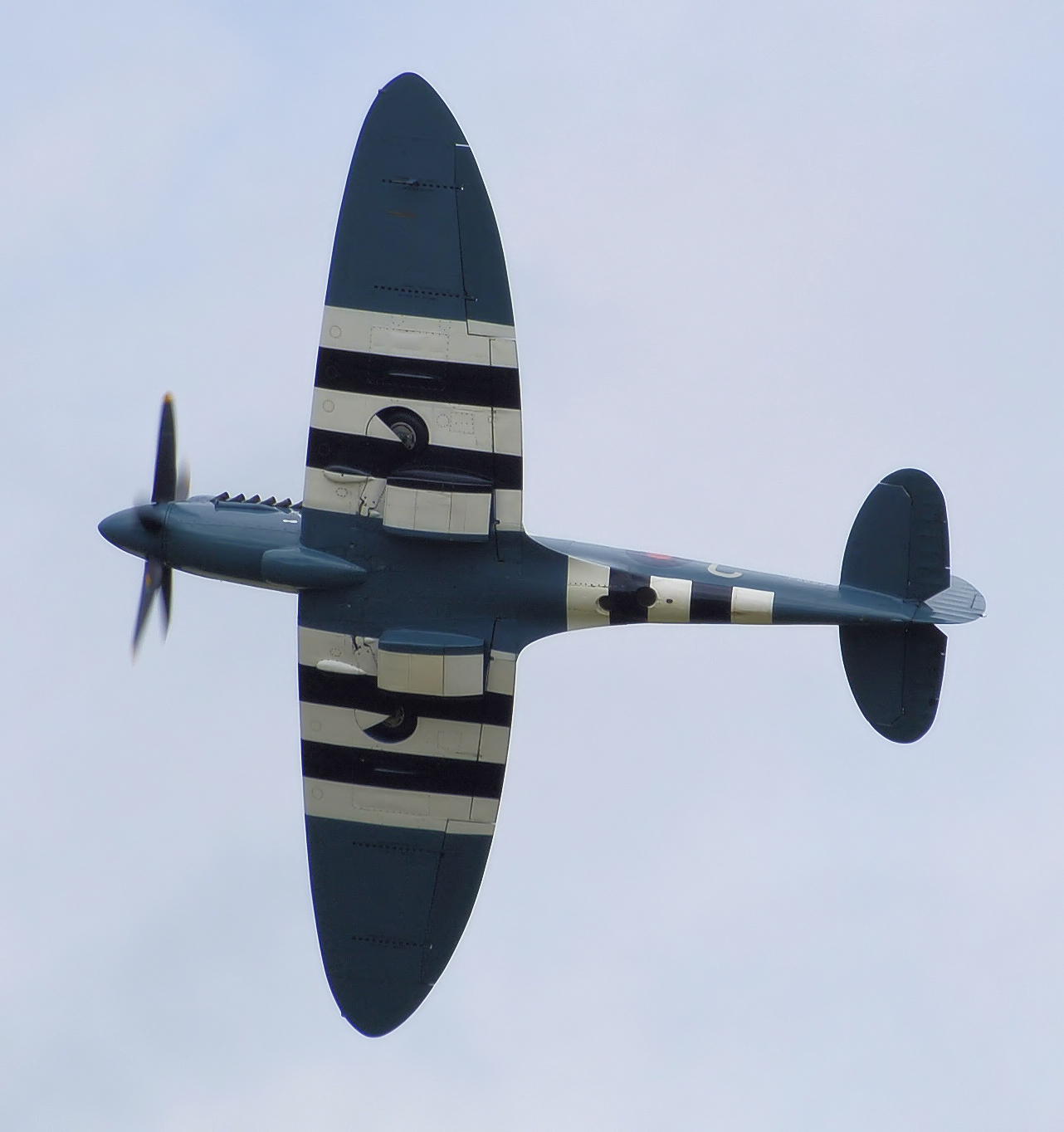
The elliptical planform of a Spitfire PR.Mk.XIX displayed at an air show in 2008, with the black and white invasion stripes visible

Another wing feature was its washout. The trailing edge of the wing twisted slightly upward along its span, the angle of incidence decreasing from +2° at its root to -½° at its tip. This caused the wing roots to stall before the tips, reducing tip-stall that could otherwise have resulted in a wing drop, often leading to a spin. As the wing roots started to stall, the separating air stream started to buffet (vibrate) the aircraft, warning the pilot, allowing even relatively inexperienced pilots to fly it to the limits of its performance. This washout was first featured in the wing of the Type 224, and became a consistent feature in subsequent designs leading to the Spitfire. The complex wing design, especially the precision required to manufacture the vital spar and leading-edge structures, caused some major delays in the production of the Spitfire at first. The problems increased when the work was put out to subcontractors, most of whom had never dealt with metal-structured, high-speed aircraft. By June 1939, most of these problems had been resolved, and production was no longer held up by a lack of wings.

All the main flight controls were originally metal structures with fabric covering. (Note: The fabric used for aircraft control surfaces had to be as light and as strong as possible: Irish linen was often used, or Grade A cotton. Once the material was stretched and doped, it was weatherproof and aerodynamically smooth.) Designers and pilots felt that having ailerons which required a degree of effort to move at high speed would avoid unintended aileron reversal, throwing the aircraft around and potentially pulling the wings off. Air combat was also felt to take place at relatively low speeds and high-speed manoeuvring would be physically impossible. Flight tests showed the fabric covering of the ailerons "ballooned" at high speeds, adversely affecting the aerodynamics. Replacing the fabric covering with light alloy dramatically improved the ailerons at high speed. During the Battle of Britain, pilots found the Spitfire's ailerons were far too heavy at high speeds, severely restricting lateral manoeuvres such as rolls and high-speed turns, which were still a feature of air-to-air combat.

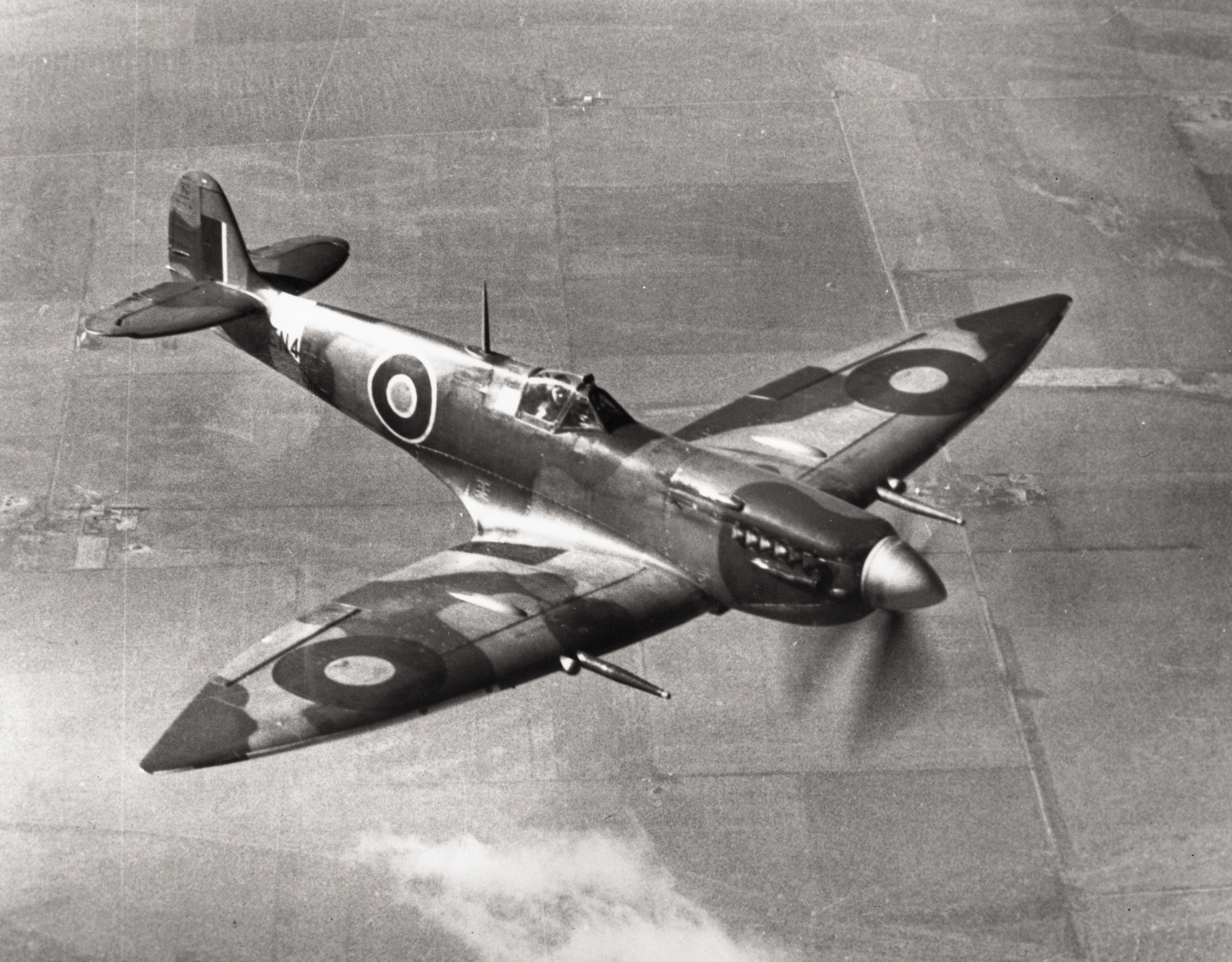
Spitfire HF Mk VII: the shape of the ellipse was altered by the extended "pointed" wing tips used by the high-altitude Mk VIs, VIIs, and early Mk VIIIs.

The Spitfire had detachable wing tips which were secured by two mounting points at the end of each main wing assembly. When the Spitfire took on a role as a high-altitude fighter (Marks VI and VII and some early Mk VIIIs), the standard wing tips were replaced by extended, "pointed" tips which increased the wingspan from 36 ft 10 in (11.23 m) to 40 ft 2 in (12.24 m). The other wing-tip variation, used by several Spitfire variants, was the "clipped" wing; the standard wing tips were replaced by wooden fairings which reduced the span by 3 ft 6 in (1.07 m). The wing tips used spruce formers for most of the internal structure with a light alloy skin attached using brass screws.

The light alloy split flaps at the trailing edge of the wing were also pneumatically operated via a finger lever on the instrument panel. Only two positions were available; fully up or fully down (85°). Flaps were normally lowered only during the final approach and for landing, and the pilot was to retract them before taxiing. (Note: On the ground, the flaps were normally lowered only for inspection or for maintenance. Pilots who forgot to raise the flaps after landing often found themselves paying a fine.)

The ellipse also served as the design basis for the Spitfire's fin and tailplane assembly, once again exploiting the shape's favourable aerodynamic characteristics. Both the elevators and rudder were shaped so that their centre of mass was shifted forward, reducing control-surface flutter. The longer noses and greater propeller-wash resulting from larger engines in later models necessitated increasingly larger vertical, and later, horizontal tail surfaces to compensate for the altered aerodynamics, culminating in those of the Mk 22/24 series, which were 25% larger in area than those of the Mk I.

=== Improved late wing designs ===
As the Spitfire gained more power and was able to manoeuvre at higher speeds, the possibility that pilots would encounter aileron reversal increased, and the Supermarine design team set about redesigning the wings to counter this. The original wing design had a theoretical aileron reversal speed of 580 mph (500 kn; 930 km/h), which was somewhat lower than that of some contemporary fighters. The Royal Aircraft Establishment noted that, at 400 mph (350 kn; 640 km/h) indicated airspeed, roughly 65% of aileron effectiveness was lost due to wing twist.

The new wing of the Spitfire F Mk 21 and its successors was designed to help alleviate this problem. Its stiffness was increased by 47%, and a new aileron design using piano hinges and geared trim tabs meant the theoretical aileron reversal speed was increased to 825 mph (717 kn; 1,328 km/h). Alongside the redesigned wing, Supermarine also experimented with the original wing, raising the leading edge by 1 inch (25 mm), with the hope of improving pilot view and reducing drag. This wing was tested on a modified F Mk 21, also called the F Mk 23, (sometimes referred to as "Valiant" rather than "Spitfire"). The increase in performance was minimal and this experiment was abandoned.

Supermarine developed a new laminar-flow wing based on new aerofoil profiles developed by the National Advisory Committee for Aeronautics in the United States, with the objective of reducing drag and improving performance. These laminar-flow airfoils were the Supermarine 371-I used at the root and the 371-II used at the tip. Supermarine estimated that the new wing could give an increase in speed of 55 mph (48 kn; 89 km/h) over the Spitfire Mk 21. The new wing was initially fitted to a Spitfire Mk XIV. Later, a new fuselage was designed, with the new fighter becoming the Supermarine Spiteful.

=== Carburation versus fuel injection ===
The Rolls Royce engine's designers deliberately chose a carburettor for the Merlin engine: Sir Stanley Hooker explained in his autobiography that "the Germans paid a large penalty for their fuel injection. When the fuel is fed before the supercharger, as on the Merlin, it evaporates and cools the air by 25°C. This cooling enhances the performance of the supercharger, and increases the power of the engine, with a corresponding increase in aircraft speed, particularly at high altitude." However, the early Merlin engine's lack of fuel injection meant that Spitfires and Hurricanes, unlike the Bf 109E, were unable to simply nose down into a steep dive. This meant a Luftwaffe fighter could simply "bunt" into a high-power dive to escape an attack, leaving the Spitfire behind, as its fuel was forced out of the carburettor by negative "g". RAF fighter pilots soon learned to "half-roll" their aircraft before diving to pursue their opponents.

In March 1941, a metal disc with a hole was fitted in the fuel line, restricting fuel flow to the maximum the engine could consume. While it did not cure the problem of the initial fuel starvation in a dive, it did reduce the more serious problem of the carburettor being flooded with fuel by the fuel pumps under negative "g". Invented by Beatrice "Tilly" Shilling, it became known as "Miss Shilling's orifice". Further improvements were introduced throughout the Merlin series, with Bendix-manufactured pressure carburettors, designed to allow fuel to flow during all flight attitudes, introduced in 1942.

=== Armament ===
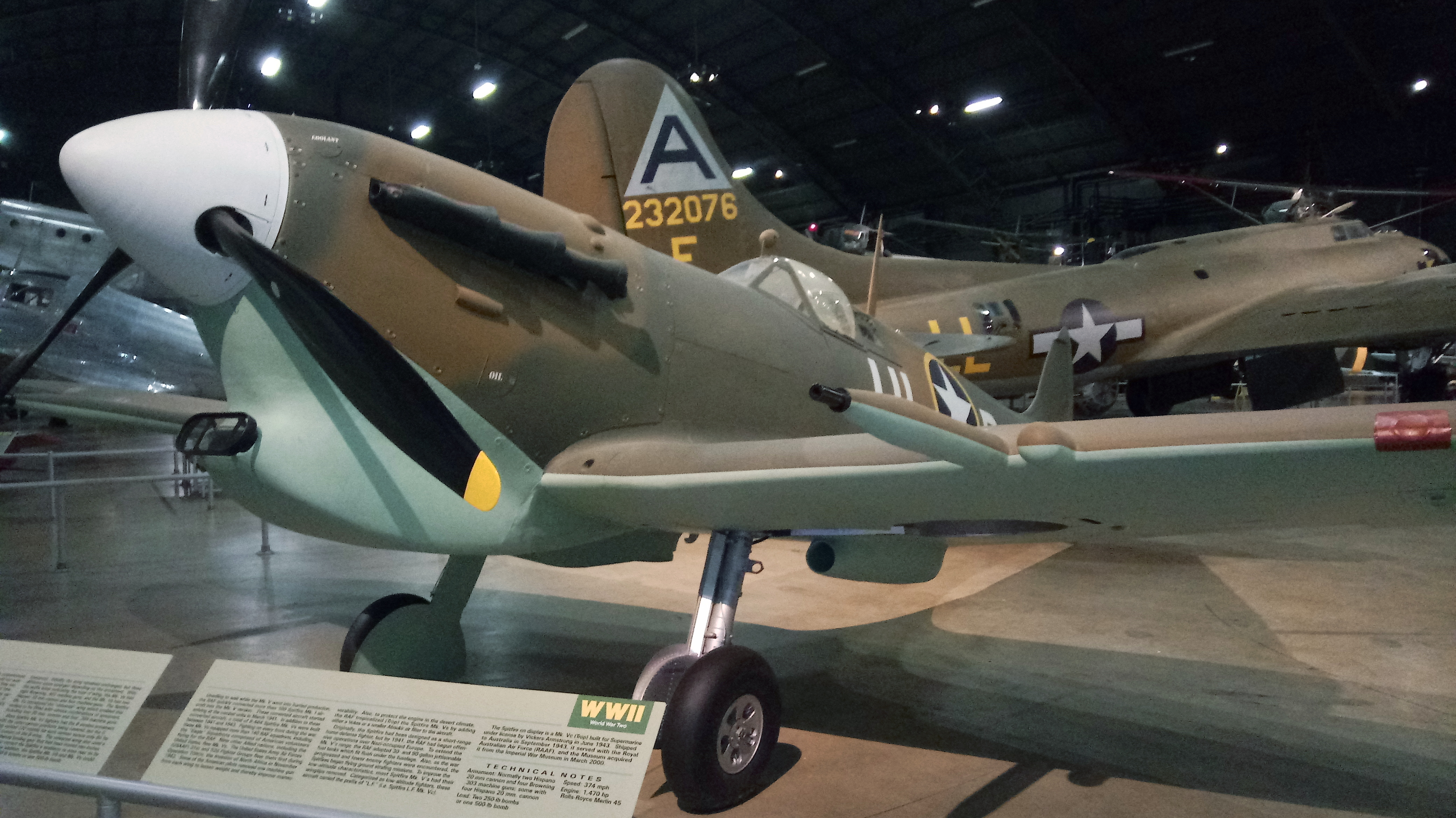
Mk. Vc (Trop) built for Supermarine under licence by Vickers-Armstrong in June 1943, on display at the National Museum of the U.S. Air Force.

Due to a shortage of Brownings, which had been selected as the new standard rifle calibre machine gun for the RAF in 1934, early Spitfires were fitted with only four guns, with the other four fitted later. Early tests showed that, while the guns worked perfectly on the ground and at low altitudes, they tended to freeze at high altitude, especially the outer wing guns, because the RAF's Brownings had been modified to fire from an open bolt. While this prevented overheating of the cordite used in British ammunition, it allowed cold air to flow through the barrel unhindered. Supermarine did not fix the problem until October 1938, when they added hot air ducts from the rear of the wing-mounted radiators to the guns, and bulkheads around the gunbays to trap the hot air in the wing. Red fabric patches were doped over the gun ports to protect the guns from cold, dirt, and moisture until they were fired.

The decision on the arming of the Spitfire (and the Hurricane) is told in Captain C. H. Keith's book I Hold my Aim. Keith held various appointments with the RAF dealing with designing, development and technical policy of armament equipment. He organised a conference, with Air Commodore Tedder in the chair, on 19 July 1934. He says "I think it can be reasonably contended that the deliberations of that conference made possible, if not certain, of the winning of the Battle of Britain, almost exactly six years later". At that meeting, scientific officer Captain F. W. "Gunner" Hill presented charts based on his calculations showing that future fighters must carry no fewer than eight machine-guns, each of which must be capable of firing 1,000 shots a minute. Hill's assistant in making his calculations had been his teenage daughter.

Even if the eight Brownings worked perfectly, pilots soon discovered that they were not sufficient to destroy larger aircraft. Combat reports showed that an average of 4,500 rounds were needed to shoot down an enemy aircraft. The main cause of this was from early misconceptions about gun harmonisation, the aiming of the eight guns. Air Chief Marshal Hugh Dowding and other air officers were convinced that a scattershot gunnery pattern would best ensure that the average RAF pilot could obtain hits, but this method did not concentrate fire for maximum damage to the enemy aircraft. Battle experience gathered in mid-1940 changed the British harmonisation scheme to a more concentrated point focussing at 750 ft (230 m) in front of the Spitfire. Meanwhile, a persistent suggestion was to augment or replace the machine guns with greater firepower; in November 1938, tests against armoured and unarmoured targets had already indicated that the introduction of a weapon with a calibre of at least 20 mm was urgently needed. A variant on the Spitfire design with four 20 mm Oerlikon cannon had been tendered to specification F37/35, but the order for prototypes had gone to the Westland Whirlwind in January 1939.

In June 1939, a Spitfire was fitted with a drum-fed Hispano in each wing, an installation that required large blisters on the wing to cover the 60-round drum, reducing speed by 8 mph (7.0 kn; 13 km/h). The cannon suffered frequent stoppages, mostly because the guns were mounted on their sides to fit as much of the magazine as possible within the wing. In January 1940, P/O George Proudman flew this prototype in combat, but the starboard gun stopped after firing a single round, while the port gun fired 30 rounds before seizing.

Nevertheless, 30 more cannon-armed Spitfires were ordered for operational trials, and they were soon known as the Mk IB, to distinguish them from the Browning-armed Mk IA; they were delivered to No. 19 Squadron beginning in June 1940. The Hispanos were found to be so unreliable that the squadron requested an exchange of its aircraft with the older Browning-armed aircraft of an operational training unit. By August, Supermarine had perfected a more reliable installation with an improved feed mechanism and four .303s in the outer wing panels. The modified fighters were then delivered to 19 Squadron.

== Operational history ==
=== Service operations ===
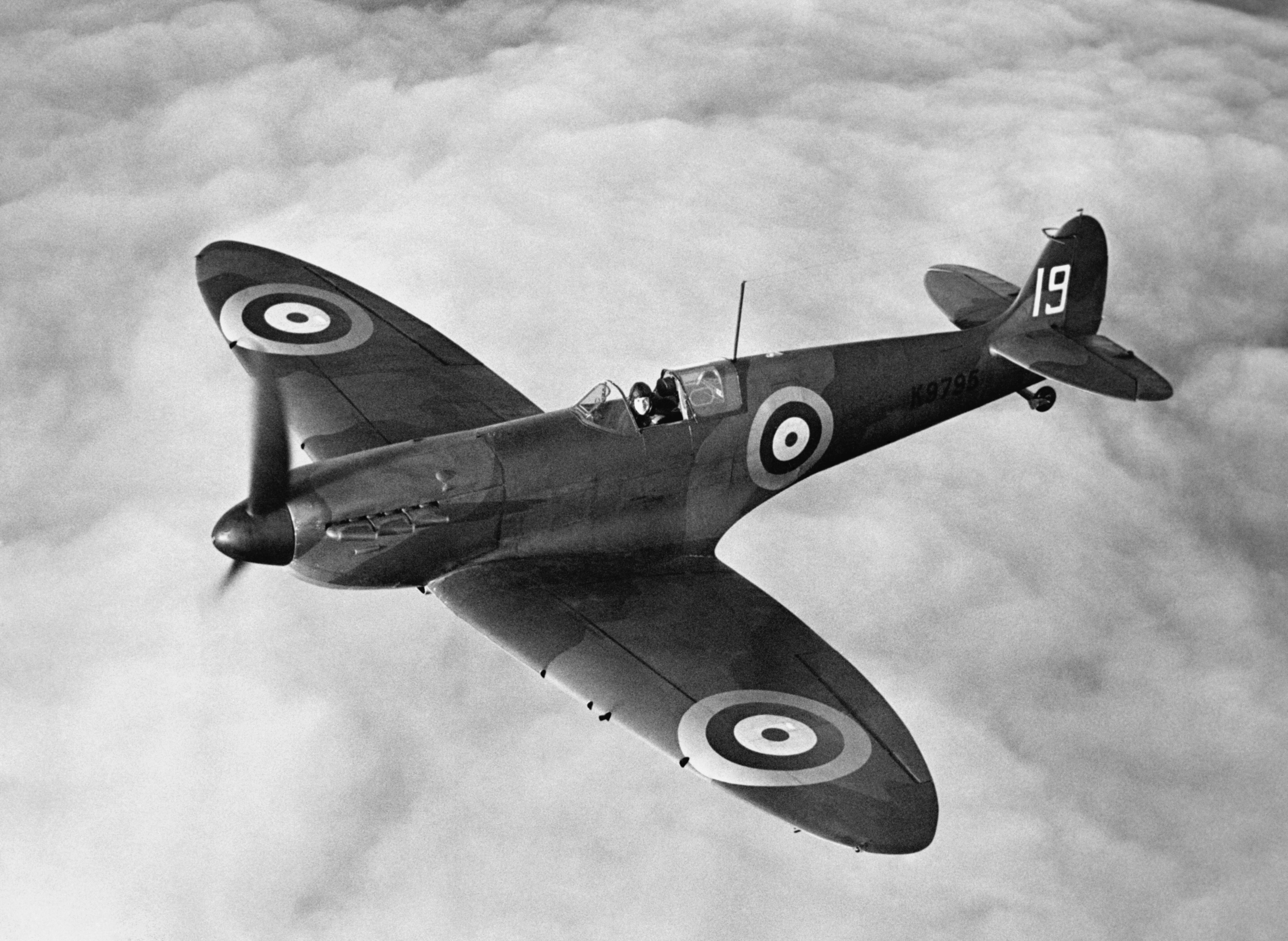
K9795, the 9th production Mk I, with 19 Squadron in 1938

The operational history of the Spitfire with the RAF began with the first Mk Is K9789, which entered service with 19 Squadron at RAF Duxford on 4 August 1938. (Note: This aircraft survived the war, only to be scrapped in 1945. The first pilot to fly K9789 was Squadron Leader Henry Cozens, whose career had begun in 1917 with the Sopwith Camel and ended after flying Meteor and Vampire jets.) The Spitfire achieved legendary status during the Battle of Britain, a reputation aided by the "Spitfire Fund" organised and run by Lord Beaverbrook, the Minister of Aircraft Production. In fact, the Hurricane outnumbered the Spitfire throughout the battle, and shouldered the burden of the defence against the Luftwaffe; however, because of its higher performance, the overall attrition rate of the Spitfire squadrons was lower than that of the Hurricane units, and the Spitfire units had a higher victory-to-loss ratio. The key aim of Fighter Command was to stop the Luftwaffe's bombers; in practice, whenever possible, the tactic was to use Spitfires to counter German escort fighters, by then based in northern France, particularly the Bf 109s, while the Hurricane squadrons attacked the bombers.

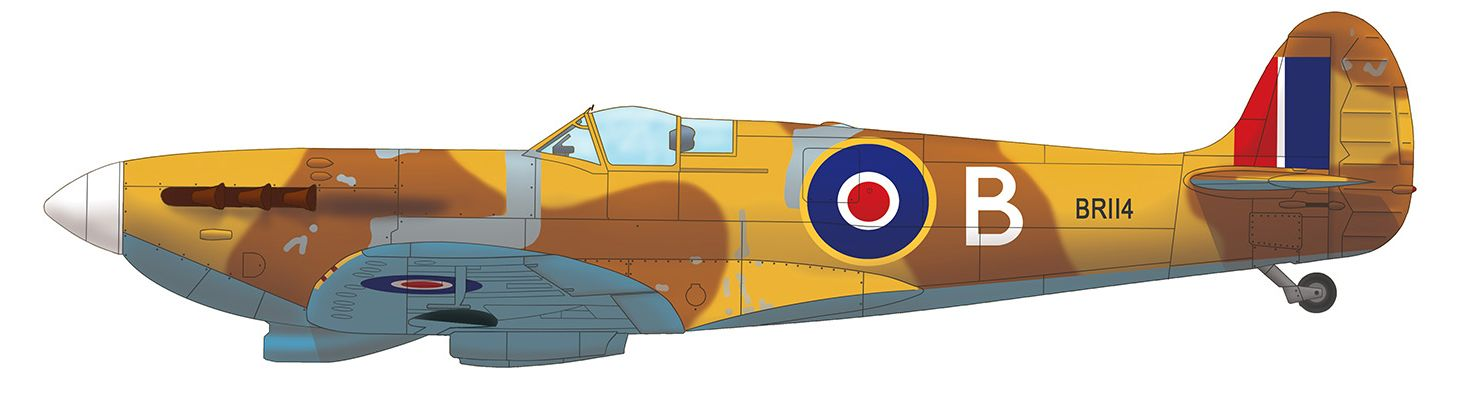
Supermarine Spitfire Mk.VC, BR114, of the No 103 MU, Aboukir, 1942

Well-known Spitfire pilots included "Johnnie" Johnson—34 enemy aircraft (e/a) shot down—who flew the Spitfire right through his operational career from late 1940 to 1945. Douglas Bader (20 e/a) and "Bob" Tuck (27 e/a) flew Spitfires and Hurricanes during the major air battles of 1940. Both were shot down and became prisoners of war, while flying Spitfires over France in 1941 and 1942. "Paddy" Finucane (28–32 e/a) scored all his successes in the fighter before disappearing over the English Channel in July 1942. Some notable Commonwealth pilots were George Beurling (31 1/3 e/a) from Canada, "Sailor" Malan (27 e/a) from South Africa, Rhodesians like Ian Smith and John Plagis, New Zealanders Alan Deere (17 e/a) and C F Gray (27 e/a) and Australians Clive Caldwell (28.5 e/a), Paterson Clarence (17 e/a) and Hugo Armstrong (12 e/a).

The Spitfire continued to play increasingly diverse roles throughout the Second World War and beyond, often in air forces other than the RAF. For example, the Spitfire became the first high-speed photo-reconnaissance aircraft to be operated by the RAF. Sometimes unarmed, they flew at high, medium, and low altitudes, often ranging far into enemy territory to closely observe the Axis powers and provide an almost continual flow of valuable intelligence information throughout the war. In 1941 and 1942, PRU Spitfires provided the first photographs of the Freya and Würzburg radar systems, and in 1943, helped confirm that the Germans were building the V1 and V2 Vergeltungswaffen ("vengeance weapons") rockets by photographing Peenemünde, on the Baltic Sea coast of Germany.

In the Mediterranean, the Spitfire blunted the heavy attacks on Malta by the Regia Aeronautica and Luftwaffe, and from early 1943, helped pave the way for the Allied invasions of Sicily and Italy. On 7 March 1942, 15 Mk Vs carrying 90 imp gal (410 L; 110 US gal) fuel tanks under their bellies took off from HMS Eagle off the coast of Algeria on a 600-mile (970 km) flight to Malta. Those Spitfire Vs were the first to see service outside Britain. The Spitfire served on the Eastern Front with the Soviet Air Force (VVS). The first deliveries of the Spitfire Mk VB variant took place at the start of 1943, with the first batch of 35 aircraft delivered via sea to the city of Basra, Iraq. A total of 143 aircraft and 50 furnished hulls (to be used for spare parts) followed by March of the same year. Though some aircraft were used for front line duty in 1943, most of them saw service with the Protivo-Vozdushnaya Oborona (English: "Anti-air Defence Branch").

The Spitfire served in the Pacific Theatre, meeting the Japanese Mitsubishi A6M Zero. Lt. Gen. Claire Chennault said: "The RAF pilots were trained in methods that were excellent against German and Italian equipment, but suicide against the acrobatic Japs." Although not as fast as the Spitfire, the Zero could out-turn it, could sustain a climb at a very steep angle, and could stay in the air for three times as long. To counter the Zero, Spitfire pilots adopted a "slash and run" policy and used their faster speed and diving superiority to fight, while avoiding turning dogfights. The Allies achieved air superiority when the Mk VIII version was introduced to the theatre, replacing the earlier Mk V.

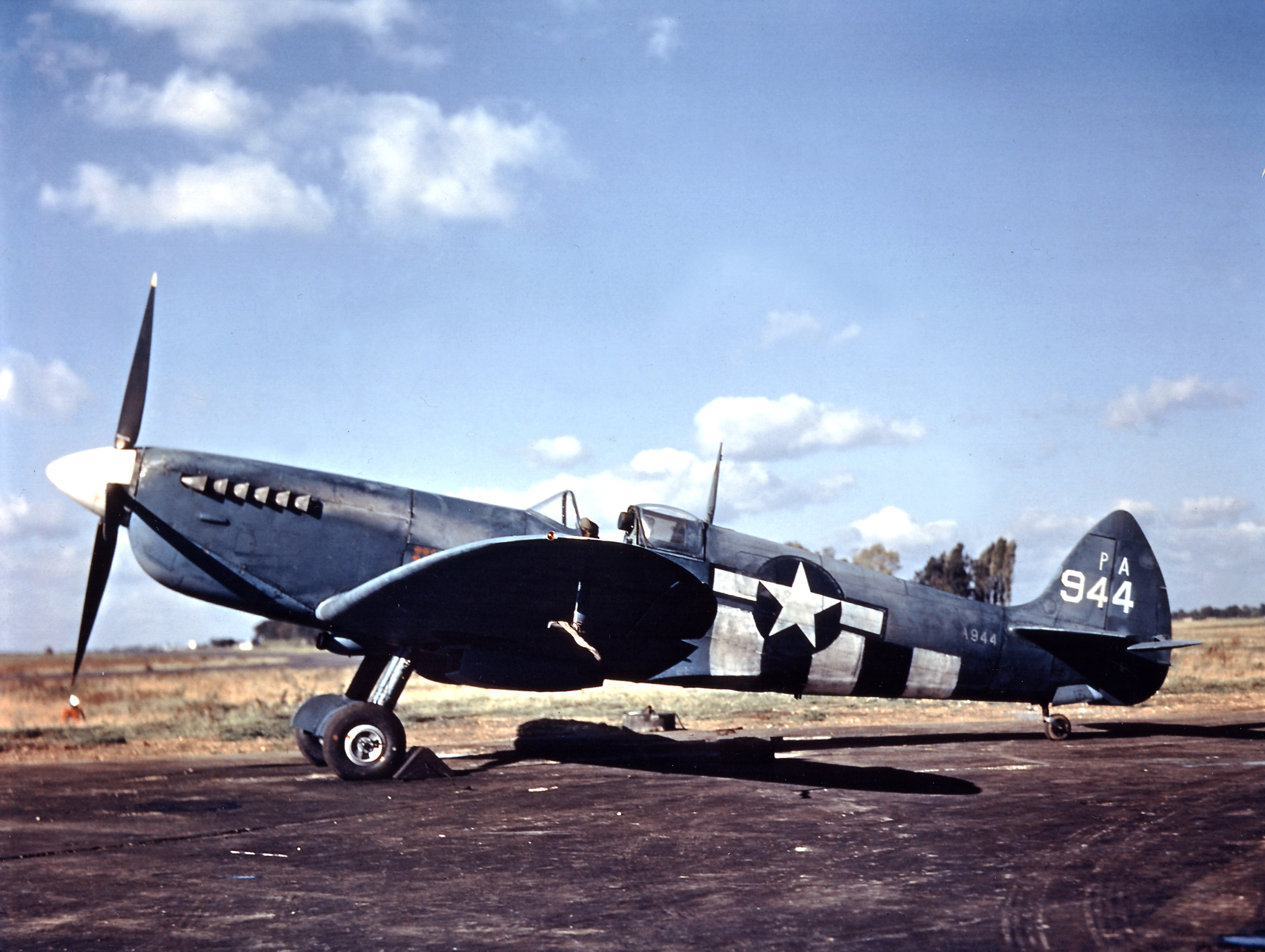
Spitfire PR Mk XI PA944 of the U.S. Army Air Forces 7th Photo Recon Group, 14th Recon Squadron at RAF Mount Farm, Oxfordshire in 1944

That Southeast Asia was a lower-priority area also did not help, and it was allocated few Spitfires and other modern fighters compared to Europe, which allowed the Japanese to easily achieve air superiority by 1942. Over the Northern Territory of Australia, Royal Australian Air Force and RAF Spitfires assigned to No. 1 Wing RAAF helped defend the port town of Darwin against air attack by the Japanese Naval Air Force, suffering heavy losses largely due to the type's limited fuel capacity. Spitfire MKVIIIs took part in the last battle of World War II involving the Western allies in Burma, in the ground attack role, helping defeat a Japanese break-out attempt.

During the Second World War, Spitfires were used by the United States Army Air Forces (USAAF) in the 4th Fighter Group until they were replaced by Republic P-47 Thunderbolts in March 1943. The 4th Fighter Group comprised the former RAF Eagle Squadrons, which transferred into American service in September 1942 and kept their Mark Vb Spitfires during the transfer. The USAAF 14th Photographic Squadron of the 8th Air Force also operated Spitfire Mark XIs from November 1943 to April 1945, flying long-range reconnaissance over Europe.

Several Spitfires were captured by the Germans and flown by units that tested, evaluated, and sometimes clandestinely operated enemy aircraft.

=== Speed and altitude records ===
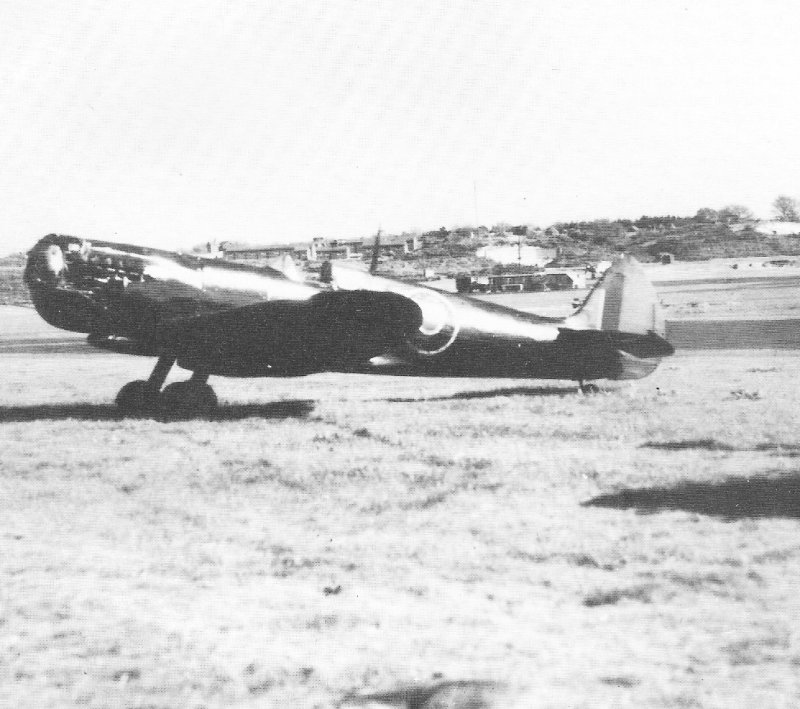
The Spitfire Mk XI flown by Sqn. Ldr. Martindale, seen here after its flight on 27 April 1944 during which it was damaged achieving a true airspeed of 620 mph (998 km/h or Mach 0.92) in a dive

Beginning in late 1943, high-speed diving trials were undertaken at Farnborough to investigate the handling characteristics of aircraft travelling at speeds near the sound barrier (i.e., the onset of compressibility effects). Because it had the highest limiting Mach number of any aircraft at that time, a Spitfire XI was chosen to take part in these trials. Due to the high altitudes necessary for these dives, a fully feathering Rotol propeller was fitted to prevent overspeeding. During these trials, EN409, flown by Squadron Leader J. R. Tobin, reached 606 mph (527 kn; 975 km/h) (Mach 0.891) in a 45° dive. In April 1944, the same aircraft suffered engine failure in another dive while being flown by Squadron Leader Anthony F. Martindale, Royal Air Force Volunteer Reserve, when the propeller and reduction gear broke off. The dive put the aircraft to Mach 0.92, the fastest ever recorded in a piston-engined aircraft, but when the propeller came off, the Spitfire, now tail-heavy, zoom-climbed back to altitude. Martindale blacked out under the 11 g loading, but when he resumed consciousness, he found the aircraft at about 40,000 feet with its (originally straight) wings now slightly swept back. Martindale successfully glided the Spitfire 20 mi (32 km) back to the airfield and landed safely. Martindale was awarded the Air Force Cross for his exploits.

RAE Bedford (RAE) modified a Spitfire for high-speed testing of the stabilator (then known as the "flying tail") of the Miles M.52 supersonic research aircraft. RAE test pilot Eric Brown stated that he tested this successfully during October and November 1944, attaining Mach 0.86 in a dive.

On 5 February 1952, a Spitfire 19 of 81 Squadron based at Kai Tak in Hong Kong reached probably the highest altitude ever achieved by a Spitfire. The pilot, Flight Lieutenant Edward "Ted" Powles, was on a routine flight to survey outside air temperature and report on other meteorological conditions at various altitudes in preparation for a proposed new air service through the area. He climbed to 50,000 ft (15,000 m) indicated altitude, with a true altitude of 51,550 ft (15,710 m). The cabin pressure fell below a safe level, and in trying to reduce altitude, he entered an uncontrollable dive which shook the aircraft violently. He eventually regained control somewhere below 3,000 ft (900 m) and landed safely with no discernible damage to his aircraft. Evaluation of the recorded flight data suggested he achieved a speed of 690 mph (600 kn; 1,110 km/h), (Mach 0.96) in the dive, which would have been the highest speed ever reached by a propeller-driven aircraft if the instruments had been considered more reliable.

That any operational aircraft off the production line, cannons sprouting from its wings and warts and all, could readily be controlled at this speed when the early jet aircraft such as Meteors, Vampires, P-80s, etc, could not, was certainly extraordinary.

— Jeffrey Quill

The critical Mach number of the Spitfire's original elliptical wing was higher than the subsequently used laminar-flow section, straight-tapering-planform wing of the follow-on Supermarine Spiteful, Seafang, and Attacker, illustrating that Reginald Mitchell's practical engineering approach to the problems of high-speed flight had paid off.

== Variants ==
=== Overview ===
Although R. J. Mitchell is justifiably known as the engineer who designed the Spitfire, his premature death in 1937 meant that all development after that date was undertaken by a team led by his chief draughtsman, Joe Smith, who became Supermarine's chief designer on Mitchell's death. As Jeffrey Quill noted: "If Mitchell was born to design the Spitfire, Joe Smith was born to defend and develop it."

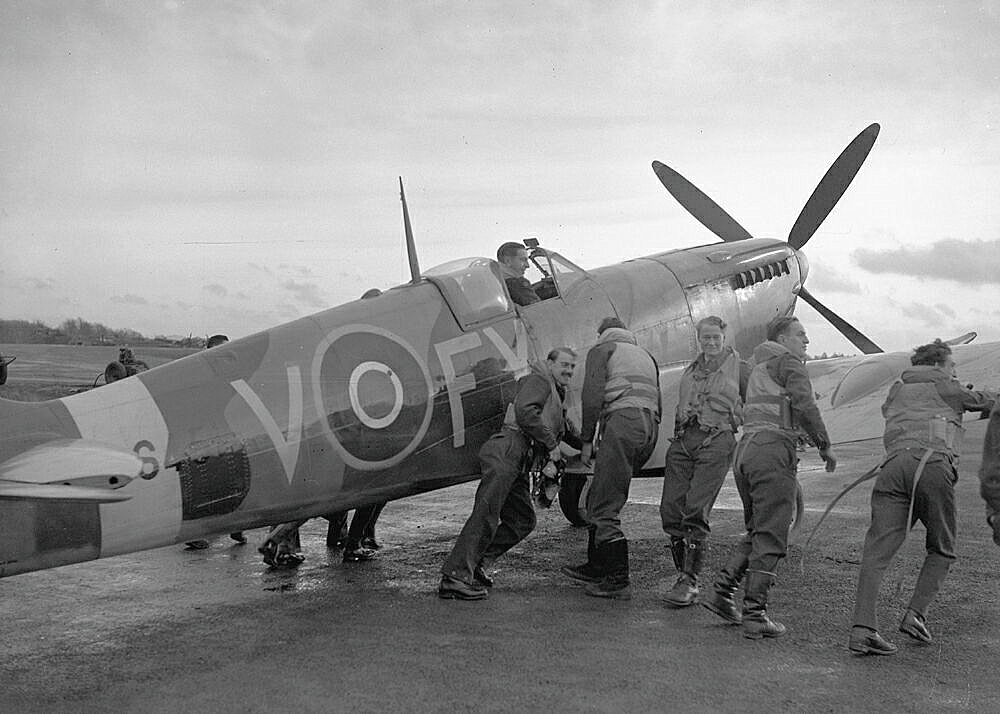
Pilots of 611 West Lancashire Squadron pushing an early Spitfire Mark IXb at Biggin Hill in late 1942

There were 24 marks of Spitfire and many sub-variants. These covered the Spitfire in development from the Merlin to Griffon engines, the high-speed photo-reconnaissance variants and the different wing configurations. More Spitfire Mk Vs were built than any other type, with 6,487 built, followed by the 5,656 Mk IXs. Different wings, featuring a variety of weapons, were fitted to most marks; the A wing used eight .303 in (7.7 mm) machine guns, the B wing had four .303 in (7.7 mm) machine guns and two 20 mm (.79 in) Hispano cannons, and the C, or universal, wing could mount either four 20 mm (.79 in) cannons or two 20 mm (.79 in) and four .303 in (7.7 mm) machine guns. As the war progressed, the C wing became more common. Another armament variation was the E wing which housed two 20 mm (.79 in) cannons and two .50 in (12.7 mm) Browning machine guns. Although the Spitfire continued to improve in speed and armament, its limited fuel capacity restricted range and endurance: it remained "short-legged" throughout its life except in the dedicated photo-reconnaissance role, when its guns were replaced by extra fuel tanks.

Supermarine developed a two-seat variant, known as the T Mk VIII, to be used for training, but none were ordered, and only one example was ever constructed (identified as N32/G-AIDN by Supermarine). In the absence of an official two-seater variant, a number of airframes were crudely converted in the field. These included a 4 Squadron SAAF Mk VB in North Africa, where a second seat was fitted instead of the upper fuel tank in front of the cockpit, although it was not a dual-control aircraft, and is thought to have been used as the squadron "run-about". The only unofficial two-seat conversions that were fitted with dual-controls were a few Russian lend/lease Mk IX aircraft. These were referred to as Mk IX UTI and differed from the Supermarine proposals by using an inline "greenhouse" style double canopy rather than the raised "bubble" type of the T Mk VIII.

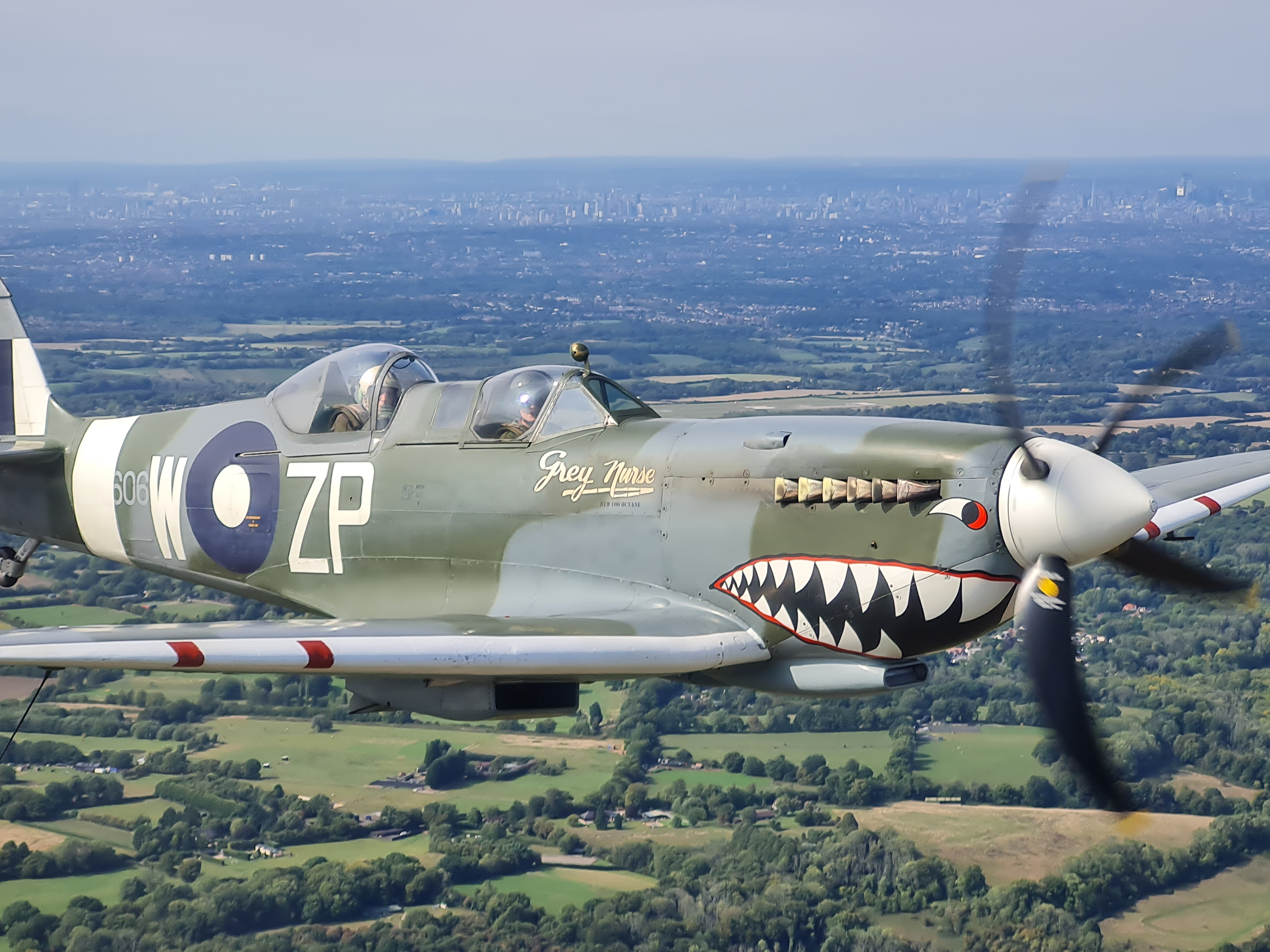
A two seater Spitfire, flying out of Biggin Hill Airport

In the postwar era, the idea was revived by Supermarine and a number of two-seat Spitfires were built by converting old Mk IX airframes with a second "raised" cockpit featuring a bubble canopy. Ten of these TR9 variants were then sold to the Indian Air Force along with six to the Irish Air Corps, three to the Royal Netherlands Air Force and one for the Royal Egyptian Air Force. Currently several of the trainers are known to exist, including both the T Mk VIII, a T Mk IX based in the US, and the "Grace Spitfire" ML407, a veteran flown operationally by 485(NZ) Squadron in 1944. (Note: The second cockpit of this aircraft has been lowered and is now below the front cockpit. This modification is known as the Grace Canopy Conversion, and was designed by Nick Grace, who rebuilt ML407. (For further details on surviving Spitfires see List of surviving Supermarine Spitfires).)

=== Seafire ===
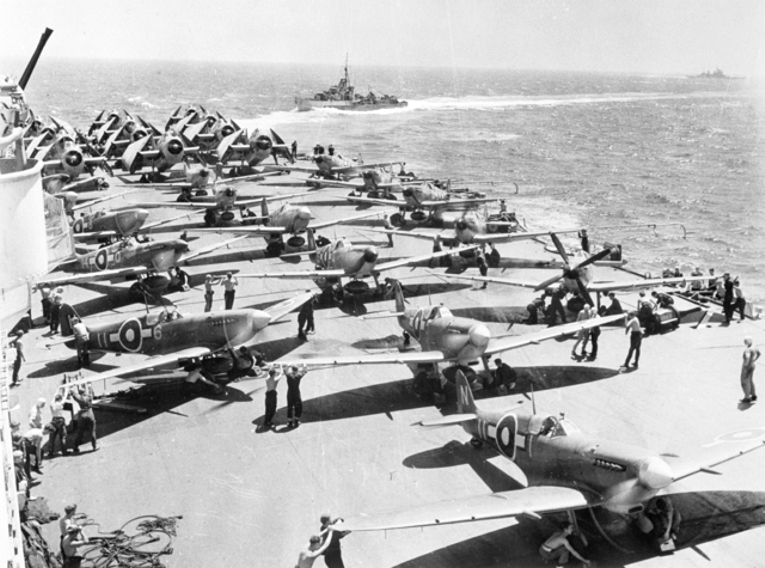
Seafires preparing to take off from the aircraft carrier HMS Implacable in 1945

The Seafire, a name derived from sea, and Spitfire, was a naval version of the Spitfire specially adapted for operation from aircraft carriers. Although the Spitfire was not designed for the rough-and-tumble of carrier-deck operations, it was considered the best available fighter at the time. The basic Spitfire design did impose some limitations on the use of the aircraft as a carrier-based fighter; poor visibility over the nose, for example, meant that pilots had to be trained to land with their heads out of the cockpit and looking along the port cowling of their Seafire. Like the Spitfire, the Seafire also had a relatively narrow undercarriage track, which meant that it was not ideally suited to deck operations. Early Seafire marks had relatively few modifications to the standard Spitfire airframe; however cumulative front line experience meant that most of the later versions of the Seafire had strengthened airframes, folding wings, arrestor hooks and other modifications, culminating in the purpose-built Seafire F/FR Mk 47.

The Seafire II was able to outperform the A6M5 Zero at low altitudes when the two types were tested against each other during wartime mock combat exercises. However, contemporary Allied carrier fighters such as the F6F Hellcat and F4U Corsair were considerably more robust and so more practical for carrier operations. Performance was greatly increased when later versions of the Seafire were fitted with the Griffon engines. These were too late to see service in World War II.

=== Griffon-engined variants ===
The first Rolls-Royce Griffon-engined Mk XII flew in August 1942, and first flew operationally with 41 Squadron in April 1943. This mark could nudge 400 mph (350 kn; 640 km/h) in level flight and climb to an altitude of 33,000 ft (10,000 m) in under nine minutes.

As American fighters took over the long-range escorting of USAAF daylight bombing raids, the Griffon-engined Spitfires progressively took up the tactical air superiority role, and played a major role in intercepting V-1 flying bombs, while the Merlin-engined variants (mainly the Mk IX and the Packard-engined Mk XVI) were adapted to the fighter-bomber role. Although the later Griffon-engined marks lost some of the favourable handling characteristics of their Merlin-powered predecessors, they could still outmanoeuvre their main German foes and other, later, American and British-designed fighters.

The final version of the Spitfire, the Mk 24, first flew at South Marston on 13 April 1946. On 20 February 1948, almost twelve years from the prototype's first flight, the last production Spitfire, VN496, left the production line. Spitfire Mk 24s were used by only one regular RAF unit, with 80 Squadron replacing their Hawker Tempests with F Mk 24s in 1947. With these aircraft, 80 Squadron continued its patrol and reconnaissance duties from Wunstorf in Germany as part of the occupation forces, until it relocated to Kai Tak Airport, Hong Kong, in July 1949. During the Chinese Civil War, 80 Squadron's main duty was to defend Hong Kong from perceived Communist threats.

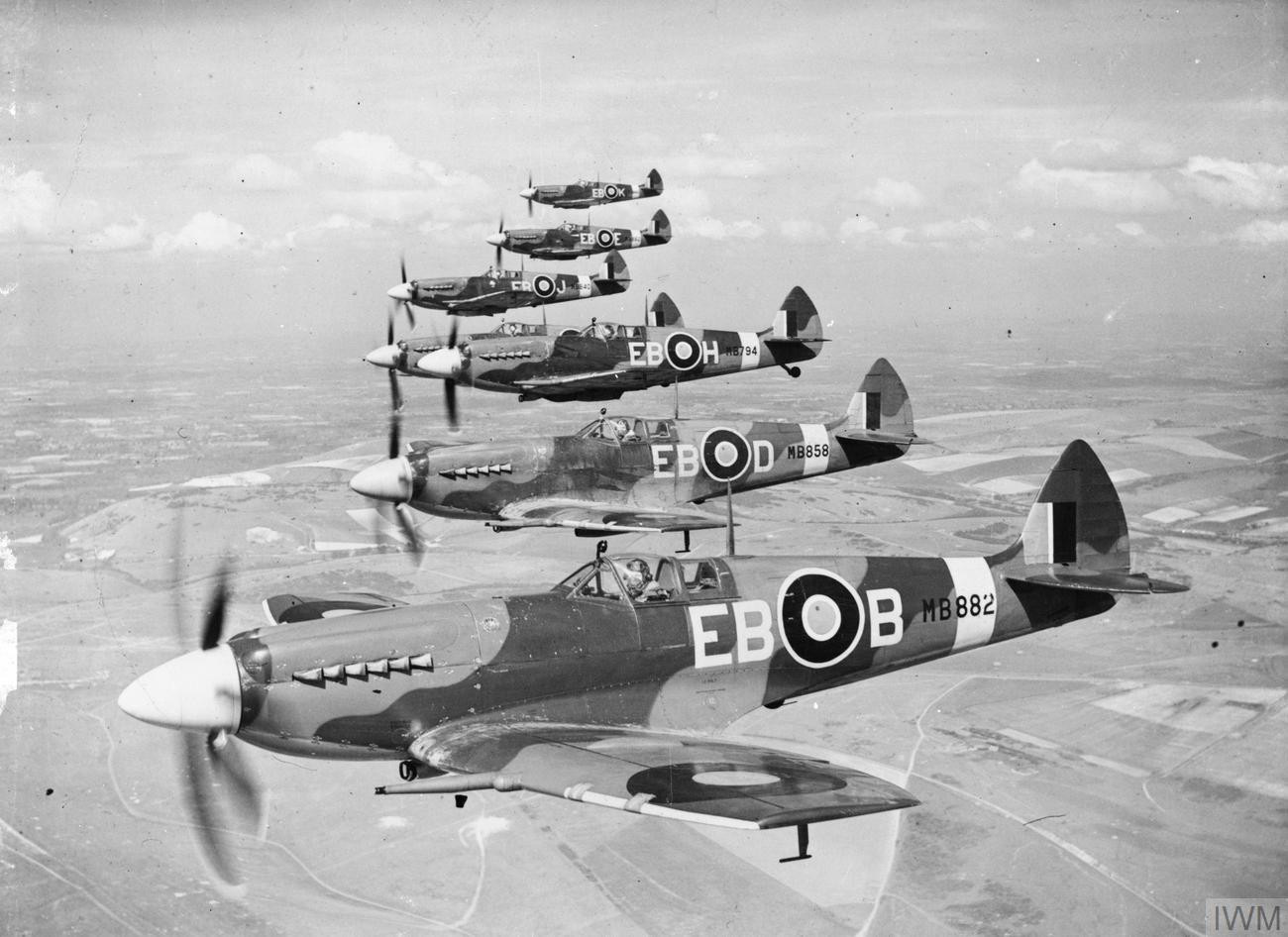
Supermarine Spitfire LF Mk XIIs of 41 Squadron in April 1944

Operation Firedog during the Malayan Emergency saw the Spitfire fly over 1,800 operational sorties against the Malayan Communists. The last operational sortie of an RAF Spitfire was flown on 1 April 1954, by PS888 a PR Mk 19 Spitfire of 81 Squadron. It was flying from RAF Seletar, in Singapore to photograph an area of jungle in Johore, Malaysia, thought to contain Communist guerrillas. To mark the special occasion, ground crewmen had painted 'The Last' on the aircraft's nose.

The last non-operational flight of a Spitfire in RAF service, which took place on 9 June 1957, was by a PR Mk 19, PS583, from RAF Woodvale of the Temperature and Humidity Flight. This was also the last known flight of a piston-engined fighter in the RAF. The last nation in the Middle East to operate Spitfires was Syria, which kept its F Mk 22s until 1953.

In late 1962, Air Marshal Sir John Nicholls instigated a trial when he flew Spitfire PM631, a PR Mk 19 in the custody of the Battle of Britain Memorial Flight, against an English Electric Lightning F 3 (a supersonic jet-engined interceptor) in mock combat at RAF Binbrook. At the time, British Commonwealth forces were involved in possible action against Indonesia over Malaya and Nicholls decided to develop tactics to fight the Indonesian Air Force P-51 Mustang, a fighter that had a similar performance to the PR Mk 19. The first airframe (PM631) developed mechanical issues which removed it from the trial. Another PR Mk 19, PS853, which is now owned by Rolls-Royce, was on gate-guard duties at Binbrook, having been retired from the Battle of Britain Memorial Flight (BBMF) one year before. It had been maintained in running condition by ground crews at Binbrook, and after a short time was participating in the trials. At the end of the trials, RAF pilots found that Firestreak infra-red guided missiles had trouble acquiring the Spitfire due to a low exhaust temperature, and decided that the twin ADEN 30 mm (1.2 in) cannons were the only weapons suited to the task, which was complicated by the tight turning circle of the Spitfire, and the Lightning's proclivity for over-running the Spitfire. It was concluded that the most effective and safest way for a modern jet-engined fighter to attack a piston-engined fighter was to engage full afterburner at an altitude lower than the Spitfire, and circle behind it to perform a hit-and-run attack, contrary to all established fighter-on-fighter doctrine at that time.

== Operators ==
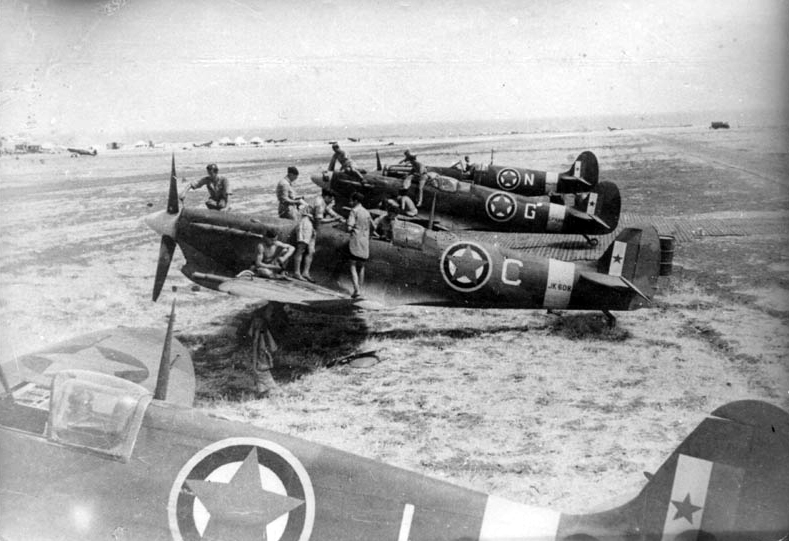
Spitfires Mk Vc (Trop) of 352 (Yugoslav) Squadron RAF (Balkan Air Force) before first mission on 18 August 1944, from Canne airfield, Italy

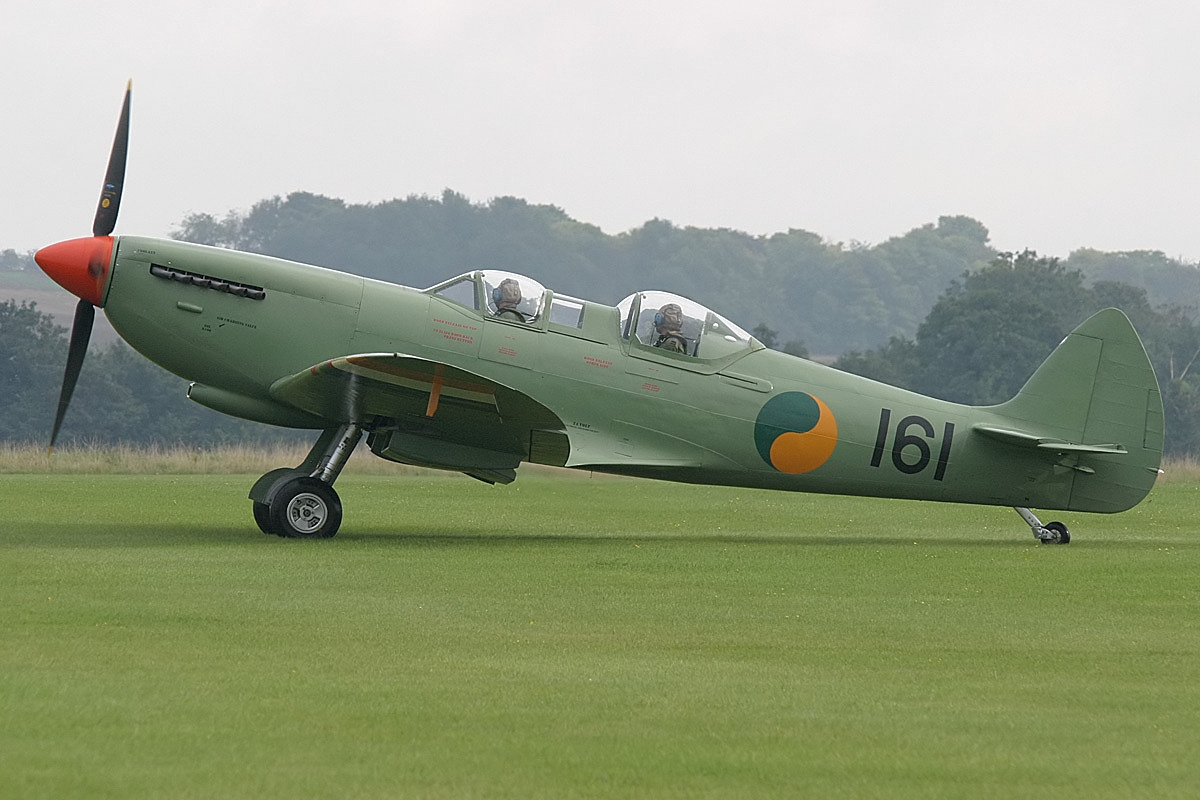
Spitfire T9 in 2005, civil registered as G-CCCA, painted in the markings of the Irish Air Corps

- Australia
- Belgium
- Burma
- Canada
- Czechoslovakia
- Denmark
- Egypt
- France
- Free France
- Greece
- Hong Kong
- India
- (British Raj) Indian Empire
- Ireland
- Israel
- Kingdom of Italy
- Italy (Italian Republic)
- Netherlands
- New Zealand
- Norway
- Pakistan
- Poland
- Portugal
- Southern Rhodesia
- South Africa
- Soviet Union
- Sweden
- Syria
- Thailand
- Turkey
- United Kingdom
- United States
- Yugoslavia

== Surviving aircraft ==
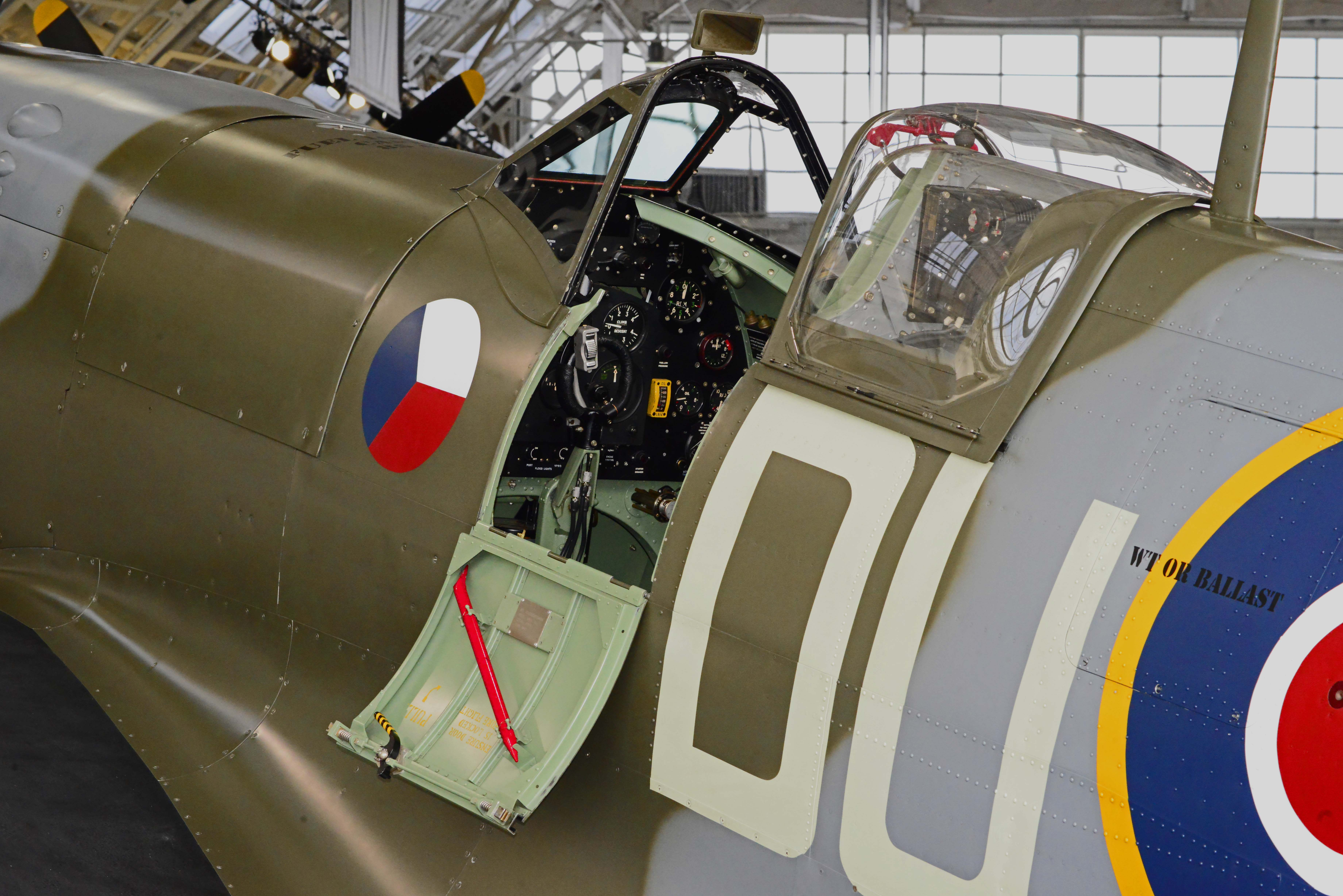
Lynn Garrison Spitfire AR614 now in Paul Allen Collection

Owing to its wide usage in World War II and iconic status, a large number of Spitfires have survived into preservation. Approximately 240 Spitfires are preserved as of 2025, including around 70 which are airworthy. Many air museums have Spitfires on static display, for example, Chicago's Museum of Science and Industry has paired a static Spitfire with a static Ju 87 R-2/Trop. Stuka dive bomber. (Note: Both of these airframes have a significant history in that they were acquired in the Second World War and used in the first war drives, which preceded the US entry into the conflict. The Spitfire, donated by the British government in 1940, was the first example to come to the United States, and was used extensively as a propaganda tool, alongside the Stuka, recovered from the Middle East.)

The oldest surviving Spitfire is a Mark 1, serial number K9942; it is preserved at the Royal Air Force Museum Cosford in Shropshire. This aircraft was the 155th built and first flew in April 1939. It flew operationally with No. 72 Squadron RAF until June 1940, when it was damaged in a wheels-up landing. After repair, it was used for training until August 1944, when it became one of several Battle of Britain aircraft veterans that were allocated to the Air Historical Branch for future museum preservation.

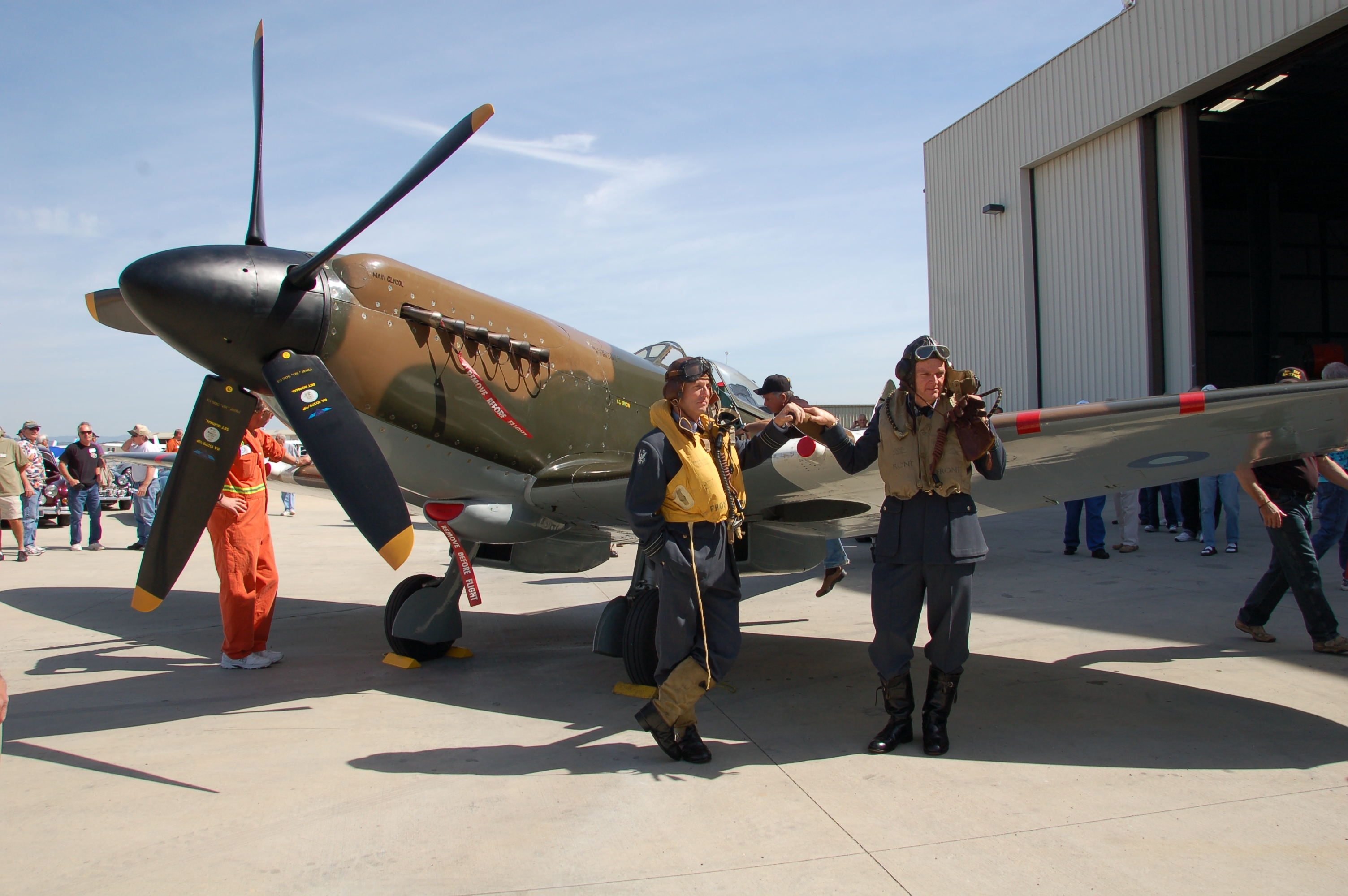
Spitfire XIVe NH749 of the Commemorative Air Force, based at Camarillo airport, Southern California, seen with period-dressed crew members in 2011

A restored Spitfire is maintained at Fantasy of Flight in Polk City, Florida. Over a six-year period in the 1990s, this aircraft was restored by Personal Plane Services in England using almost 90% of its original aircraft skins. The owner Kermit Weeks insisted that the aircraft be restored as closely as possible to its original condition. Machine guns, cannon, gun sight and original working radios are all installed.

Two MK 1 Supermarine Spitfires, originally restored by the Aircraft Restoration Company, remain in flying condition at the Imperial War Museum Duxford, in Cambridgeshire, England. Both restored by American billionaire Thomas Kaplan, one has been donated to the Imperial War Museum and the second was auctioned in July 2015 at Christie's, London. It was one of only four flying Mk I Spitfires at the time, with a fifth (P9372) restored to airworthy status following its first post-restoration flight on 22 April 2025. The aircraft fetched a record £3.1 million at auction on 9 July, beating the previous record for a Spitfire of £1.7 million set in 2009. In 2021, Duxford hosted an exhibition of the Spitfire's evolution with twelve of the aircraft on display. This was reportedly the largest number "under one roof" during the 21st century.

A Spitfire model ML407 was purchased by Carolyn Grace and her husband Nick in 1979. Carolyn Grace subsequently flew the Spitfire in several displays, including one commemorating the 60th anniversary of D-Day in 2004.

=== Search for reported surviving Spitfires in Burma ===
After hostilities ceased in Asia in 1945, a number of Spitfire Mk.XIVs were rumoured to be buried in crates in Burma. Excavations carried out at Yangon International Airport (formerly RAF Mingaladon) in early 2013 failed to locate any of the rumoured aircraft, and the team reported that they found no evidence that Spitfires were shipped there in crates or buried. Pat Woodward, who was an RAF pilot operating from Burma at the end of the war, reported that no such burying took place. In 2016 it was reported that the hunt was continuing.

== Memorials ==
- A fibreglass replica of the Mk.1 Spitfire Mk1 YT-J (R6675), flown by Supermarine test pilot Jeffrey Quill during his brief period of active service with 65 Squadron, is on display at the Kent Battle of Britain Museum at Hawkinge near Folkestone.
- Sentinel is a sculpture by Tim Tolkien depicting three Spitfires in flight at the roundabout junction (popularly known as Spitfire Island) of the A47 and A452 in Castle Bromwich, Birmingham, England, commemorating the main Spitfire factory. The island sits at the adjoining southern corners of the former Castle Bromwich Aircraft Factory and Aerodrome (now Castle Vale housing estate). There is also a Spitfire and a Hurricane in the nearby Thinktank Science Museum.
- Jeffrey Quill, the former Supermarine test pilot, initiated a project to build an exact replica of K5054, the prototype Spitfire to be put on permanent public display as a memorial to R.J. Mitchell. A team of original Supermarine designers worked with Aerofab Restorations of Andover for 10 years to create the facsimile. It was unveiled to the public in April 1993 by Quill at the RAF Museum, Hendon, and is currently on loan to the Tangmere Military Aviation Museum.
- One of the few remaining Supermarine Spitfires with a wartime record is on display (alongside a Hawker Hurricane) at the RAF Manston Spitfire and Hurricane Memorial Museum, near Kent International Airport.
- Lodge Hill Garage, Abingdon, Oxfordshire has a full-size replica Spitfire as a rooftop monument. Owner Peter Jewson bought the replica in a campaign to build the first ever national memorial to honour the 166 women from the Air Transport Auxiliary (ATA) who flew Spitfires and other aircraft from factories to their operational airbases; 14 died during these ferry flights.
- A fibreglass replica of a Spitfire Mk IX is mounted to the roof of the speciality shop, Spitfire Emporium, in Kitchener, Ontario.
- There is a replica of a Spitfire (and of a Hurricane) at the entrance to the Eden Camp Modern History Museum as a memorial to pilots who served in the Battle of Britain.
- A full-size pole-mounted replica was erected in 2021 on the site of a Salisbury factory.
- In 2009, the Spitfire was selected by the Royal Mail for their "British Design Classics" commemorative postage stamp issue.

== Restorations and replicas ==
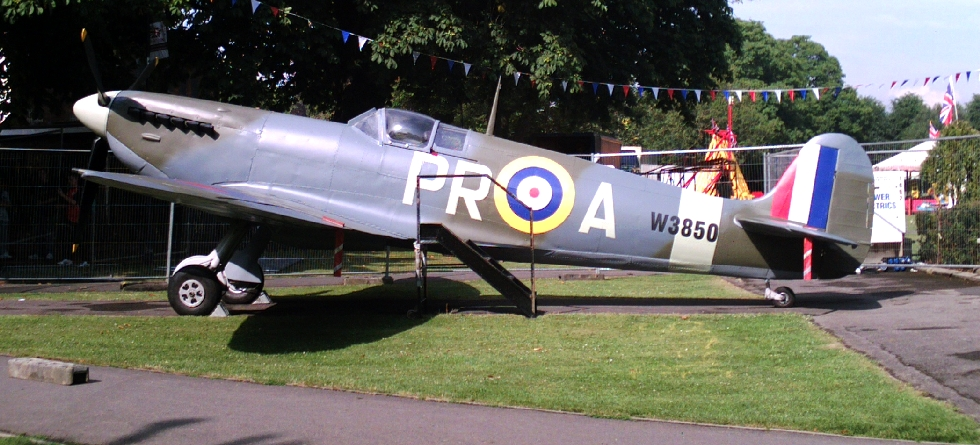
Replica Mk Vb on display in 2009

The Aircraft Restoration Company, a British organisation involved in aircraft restoration, has either restored, overhauled or built from scratch a significant proportion of the Spitfires that are now airworthy. Several other manufacturers have produced replica Spitfires, either as complete aircraft or as kits for self-building. These range in scale from 60% scale to full-size, and most use wooden construction rather than the original all-metal monocoque design. These include the Jurca Spit from France, and those manufactured by Tally Ho Enterprises in Canada. Supermarine Aircraft – originally from Brisbane, Australia, and now based in Cisco, Texas – manufacture the 80% scale Spitfire Mk26 and the 90% scale Mk26B replicas. Their Supermarine Aircraft Spitfire is supplied in kit form and is the only all-aluminium reproduction Spitfire in production. The Isaacs Spitfire (1975) and the Time Warp Spitfire Mk V (1996) are homebuilt 60% scale replicas, and Bob DeFord of Prescott, Arizona built and flies a 100% scale replica.

== In media ==
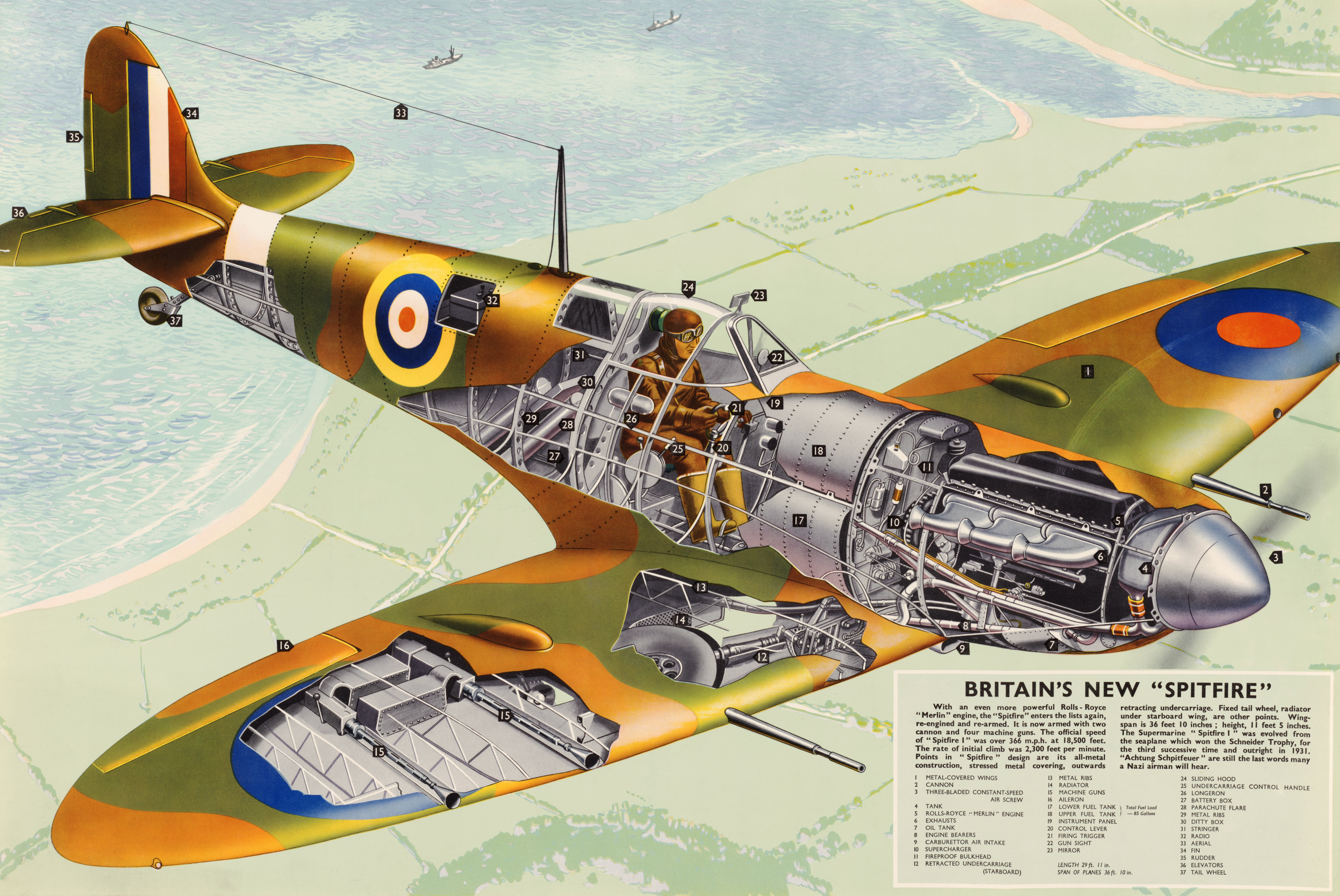
Cutaway diagram of the Spitfire

During and after the Battle of Britain, the Spitfire became a symbol of British resistance. Numerous films and documentaries featuring the Spitfire have been produced, including:

- The First of the Few (also known as Spitfire in the US and Canada) (1942) is a British film produced and directed by Leslie Howard, with Howard in the starring role of R. J. Mitchell, and David Niven playing a composite character based on the Schneider Trophy pilots of 1927, 1929 and 1931, and the Supermarine test pilot Jeffrey Quill. Some of the footage includes film shot in 1941 of operational Spitfires and pilots of 501 Squadron (code letters SD). Howard spent a long time researching the history of the Spitfire's development for the film; Mrs. Mitchell and her son Gordon were on the set during much of the production.
- Malta Story (1953), starring Alec Guinness, Jack Hawkins, Anthony Steel and Muriel Pavlow, is a black and white war film telling the story of the defence of Malta in 1942 when Spitfires were the island's main defence from air attacks.
- Reach for the Sky (1956) starring Kenneth More tells the story of Douglas Bader, using contemporary Spitfire aircraft in the production.
- Battle of Britain (1969) directed by Guy Hamilton and starring Laurence Olivier, Michael Caine, Christopher Plummer, Ralph Richardson, Michael Redgrave and Susannah York, is set in 1940. Features several sequences involving a total of 12 flying Spitfires (mostly Mk IX versions because not many Mk.Is were available at the time).
- Piece of Cake (1987) starring Tom Burlinson, aired on the ITV network in 1987. Based on the novel by Derek Robinson, the six-part miniseries covers the prewar era to "Battle of Britain Day", 15 September 1940. It depicts air combat over the skies of France and Britain during the early stages of the Second World War, though using five flying examples of late model Spitfires in place of the novel's early model Hurricanes.
- Dark Blue World (2001), starring Ondřej Vetchý, is a tale of two Czech pilots who escape Nazi-occupied Europe to fly Spitfires during the Battle of Britain. Jan Svěrák filmed some new aerial scenes and reused aerial footage from Hamilton's film.
- Guy Martin's Spitfire (2014) is a Channel 4 documentary covering the two-year restoration of a Mark 1 Spitfire, N3200, coded 'QV', that had been buried beneath the sand for 46 years after crash landing during the Dunkirk evacuation in 1940. Guy Martin tells the Boy's Own-style story of its pilot, Squadron Leader Geoffrey Stephenson and helps in the restoration of the aircraft at the Aircraft Restoration Company facilities at Duxford.
- Dunkirk (2017), directed by Christopher Nolan, features three Spitfires defending the evacuation of British and French troops from Dunkirk against attacks by the German Luftwaffe.
- Spitfire: The People's Plane (2020) is a BBC World Service ten-part podcast on the efforts of the people who built the aircraft.
- The current badge for the British football club Eastleigh F.C., introduced in 2020, prominently features the Supermarine Spitfire.

== Specifications (Spitfire Mk Vb) ==
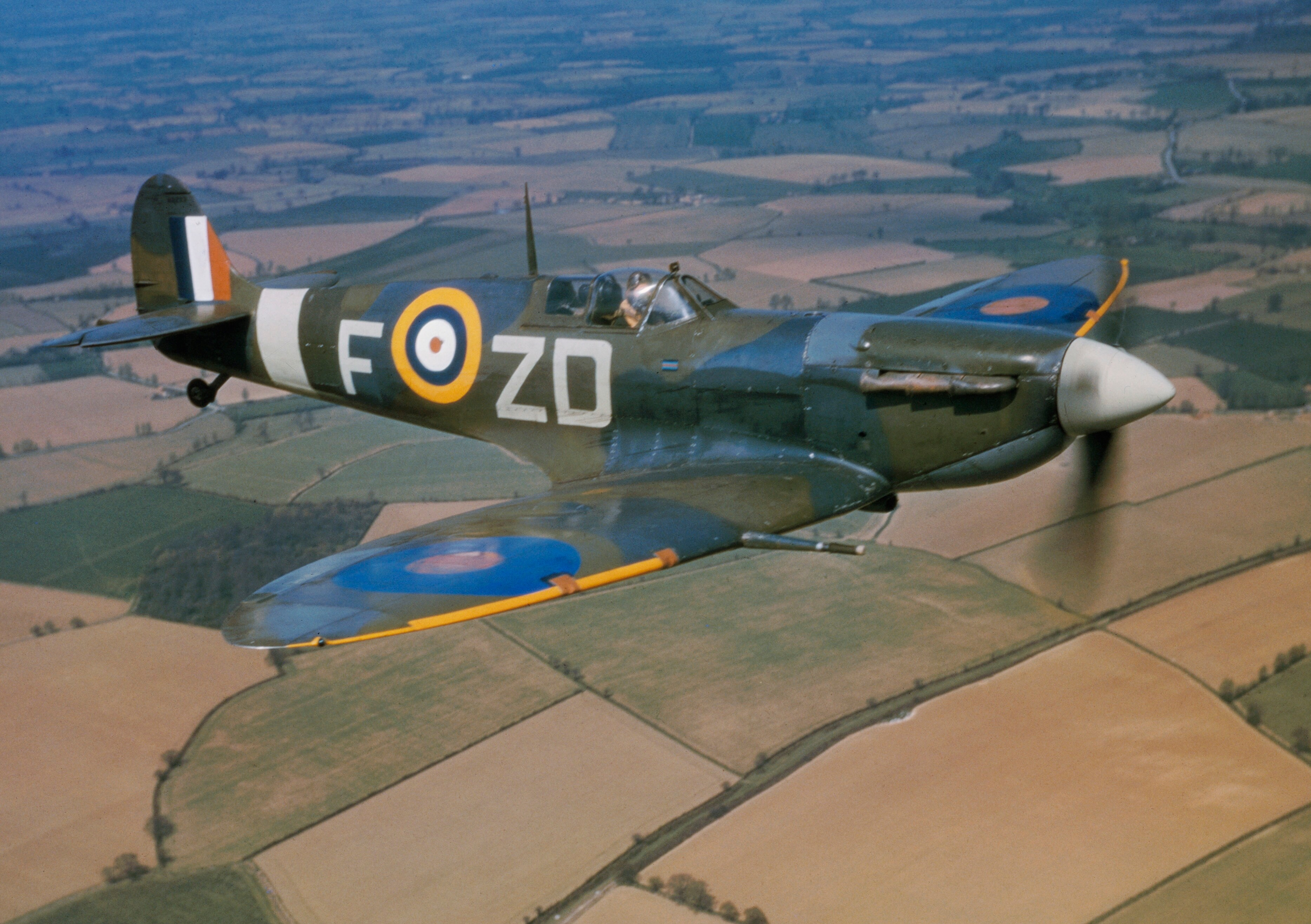
Spitfire VB of 222 Squadron, 1942

The Spitfire's performance improved greatly as WWII progressed; for more information, see Supermarine Spitfire variants: specifications, performance and armament.

Data from Spitfire: The History and Jane's Fighting Aircraft of World War II.

General characteristics

- Crew: 1
- Length: 29 ft 11 in (9.12 m)
- Wingspan: 36 ft 10 in (11.23 m)
- Height: 11 ft 5 in (3.48 m)
- Wing area: 242.1 sq ft (22.49 m^{2})
- Airfoil: root: NACA 2213; tip: NACA 2209.4
- Empty weight: 5,065 lb (2,297 kg)
- Gross weight: 6,622 lb (3,004 kg)
- Max takeoff weight: 6,700 lb (3,039 kg)
- Powerplant: 1 × Rolls-Royce Merlin 45 V-12 liquid-cooled piston engine, 1,470 hp (1,100 kW) (Note: The Merlin 46 and Merlin 50 were also used in the VB.)
- Propellers: 3-bladed Rotol constant-speed propeller

Performance

- Maximum speed: 370 mph (600 km/h, 320 kn)
- Range: 479 mi (771 km, 416 nmi)
- Combat range: 248 mi (399 km, 216 nmi)
- Ferry range: 1,100 mi (1,800 km, 960 nmi) with fuel tank
- Service ceiling: 36,500 ft (11,100 m)
- Rate of climb: 2,600 ft/min (13 m/s)
- Wing loading: 27.35 lb/sq ft (133.5 kg/m^{2})
- Power/mass: 0.22 hp/lb (0.36 kW/kg)

Armament

- Guns:
  - A wing
    - 8 × .303 in Browning Mk II* machine guns (350 rounds per gun)
  - B wing
    - 2 × 20 mm Hispano Mk II (60 rounds per gun)
    - 4 × .303 in Browning Mk II* machine guns (350 rounds per gun)
  - C wing
    - 4 × 20 mm Hispano Mk II cannon (120 rounds per gun)
  - C wing (Alt.)
    - 2 × 20 mm Hispano Mk II (120 rounds per gun)
    - 4 × .303 in Browning Mk II* machine guns (350 rounds per gun)
  - E wing
    - 2 × 20 mm Hispano Mk II cannon (120 rounds per gun)
    - 2 × .50 in M2 Browning machine guns (250 rounds per gun)
- Rockets: 2 RP-3 rockets (1 under each wing)

== See also ==
- Aircraft of the Battle of Britain
- Allied technological cooperation during World War II

Related development

- Supermarine S.6B
- Supermarine Seafire
- Supermarine Spiteful
- Supermarine Seafang

Aircraft of comparable role, configuration, and era

- Bell P-39 Airacobra
- Curtiss P-40 Warhawk
- Dewoitine D.520
- Fiat G.55 Centauro
- Hawker Hurricane
- Heinkel He 112
- Macchi C.202 Folgore
- Messerschmitt Bf 109
- Mikoyan-Gurevich MiG-3
- North American P-51 Mustang
- Yakovlev Yak-1

Related lists

- List of Supermarine Spitfire topics
- List of most produced aircraft
- List of aircraft of the Royal Air Force
- List of aircraft of World War II
- List of surviving Supermarine Spitfires

== Bibliography ==
- Ackroyd, John. "The Aerodynamics of the Spitfire". Journal of Aeronautical History (2016) 20#1:59–86
- Air Ministry. A.P 1565B Spitfire IIA and IIB Aeroplanes: Merlin XII Engine, Pilot's Notes. London: Air Data Publications, 1972. ISBN 0-85979-043-6.
- Air Ministry. Pilot's Notes for Spitfire, IX XI & XVI. Merlin 61, 63, 66, 70 or 266 Engine. London: Air Data Publications, 1946. ASIN B000TUWO64
- Andrews, C.F. and E.B. Morgan. Supermarine Aircraft since 1914. London: Putnam, 1987. ISBN 0-85177-800-3.
- Bader, Douglas. Fight for the Sky: The Story of the Spitfire and Hurricane. London: Cassell Military Books, 2004. ISBN 0-304-35674-3.
- Bodie, Warren M. The Lockheed P-38 Lightning: The Definitive Story of Lockheed's P-38 Fighter. Hayesville, North Carolina: Widewing Publications, 2001, first edition 1991. ISBN 0-9629359-5-6.
- Bowyer, Chaz. Supermarine Spitfire. London, Arms and Armour Press, 1980. ISBN 0-85368-464-2.
- Bowyer, Michael. Interceptor Fighters for the Royal Air Force 1935–45. Wellingborough, UK: Patrick Stevens, 1984. ISBN 0-85059-726-9.
- Brown, Eric. "Spitfires with Sea Legs, Part two." Air International, Vol. 15, No. 4, October 1978.
- Bungay, Stephen. The Most Dangerous Enemy: A History of the Battle of Britain. London: Aurum, 2001. ISBN 1-85410-801-8.
- Buttler, Tony. British Secret Projects: Fighters and Bombers 1935–1950. Hersham, UK: Midland, 2004. ISBN 1-85780-179-2.
- Carpenter, Chris. Flightwise: Part 1, Principles of Aircraft Flight. Shrewsbury, UK: AirLife, 1996. ISBN 1-85310-719-0.
- Cross, Roy and Gerald Scarborough. Messerschmitt Bf 109, Versions B-E. London: Patrick Stevens, 1976. ISBN 0-85059-106-6.
- Cull, Brian with Fredrick Galea. Spitfires Over Malta: The Epic Air Battles of 1942. London: Grub Street, 2005. ISBN 1-904943-30-6.
- Danel, Raymond and Jean Cuny. Docavia n°4: le Dewoitine D.520 (in French). Paris, France: Editions Larivière, 1966.
- Deere, Brendon. Spitfire: Return to Flight. Palmerston North, NZ: ITL Aviation Limited, 2010. ISBN 978-0-473-16711-0.
- Deighton, Len. Fighter: The True Story of the Battle of Britain. London: Grafton 1977. ISBN 0-7858-1208-3.
- Delve, Ken. The Story of the Spitfire: An Operational and Combat History. London: Greenhill books, 2007. ISBN 978-1-85367-725-0.
- Dibbs, John and Tony Holmes. Spitfire: Flying Legend. Southampton, UK: Osprey Publishing, 1997. ISBN 1-84176-005-6.
- Eforgan, Estel. Leslie Howard: The Lost Actor. London: Mitchell Vallentine & Company, 2010. ISBN 978-0-85303-941-9.
- Ethell, Jeffrey L. World War II in the Air. Annapolis, Maryland: Naval Institute Press, 1994. ISBN 1-55750-249-8.
- Ethell, Jeffrey L. and Steve Pace. Spitfire. St. Paul, Minnesota: Motorbooks International, 1997. ISBN 0-7603-0300-2.
- Flack, Jeremy. Spitfire – The World's Most Famous Fighter. London: Chancellor Press, 1994. ISBN 1-85152-637-4.
- Flintham, Victor. Air Wars and Aircraft: A Detailed Record of Air Combat, 1945 to the Present. New York: Facts on File, 1990. ISBN 0-8160-2356-5.
- Gerdessen, Frederik. "Estonian Air Power 1918–1945". Air Enthusiast, No. 18, April–July 1982. pp. 61–76. ISSN 0143-5450.
- Gilman J.D. and J. Clive. KG 200. London: Pan Books Ltd., 1978. ISBN 0-85177-819-4
- Glancey, Jonathan. Spitfire: The Illustrated Biography. London: Atlantic Books, 2006. ISBN 978-1-84354-528-6.
- Green, Peter. "Spitfire Against a Lightning". Flypast, No. 315, October 2007.
- Green, William. Famous Fighters of the Second World War, 3rd ed. New York: Doubleday, 1975. ISBN 0-356-08334-9.
- Green, William. Messerschmitt Bf 109: The Augsburg Eagle; A Documentary History. London: Macdonald and Jane's Publishing Group Ltd., 1980. ISBN 0-7106-0005-4.
- Green, William and Gordon Swanborough. The Great Book of Fighters. St. Paul, Minnesota: MBI Publishing, 2001. ISBN 0-7603-1194-3.
- Gueli, Marco. "Spitfire con Coccarde Italiane (Spitfire in Italian service)." (in Italian) Storia Militare n. 62, November 1998.
- Gunston, Bill et al. "Supermarine unveils its high-performance monoplane today (5 March)." The Chronicle of Aviation. Liberty, Missouri: JL International Publishing, 1992. ISBN 1-872031-30-7.
- Henshaw, Alex. Sigh for a Merlin: Testing the Spitfire: 2nd Revised edition . London: Crecy Publishing, 1999. ISBN 978-0-947554-83-5.
- Henshaw, Alex. "Spitfire: A Test Pilot's Defence." Aeroplane Monthly, Vol. 9, Issue No. 269, September 1995.
- Holland, James. Fortress Malta: An Island Under Siege, 1940–1943. New York: Miramax Books, 2003. ISBN 1-4013-5186-7.
- Holmes, Tony. Spitfire vs Bf 109: Battle of Britain. London: Osprey Aerospace, 2007. ISBN 978-1-84603-190-8
- Jackson, Robert. Aircraft of World War II: Development, Weaponry, Specifications. Edison, New Jersey: Chartwell Books, 2003. ISBN 0-7858-1696-8.
- Jane, Fred T. "The Supermarine Spitfire." Jane's Fighting Aircraft of World War II. London: Studio, 1946. ISBN 1-85170-493-0.
- Jane, Fred T. Jane's Fighting Aircraft of World War II (repr). New York: Crescent Books, 1998. ISBN 0-517-67964-7.
- Keith, C.H. I Hold My Aim. George, Allen and Unwin Ltd, London, 1946.
- Lawrence, Joseph (1945). The Observer's Book Of Airplanes. London and New York: Frederick Warne & Co.
- Lednicer, David A. "Technical Note: A CFD Evaluation of Three Prominent World War II Fighter Aircraft." Aeronautical Journal, Royal Aeronautical Society, June/July 1995.
- Lednicer, David A. "World War II Fighter Aerodynamics." EAA Sport Aviation, January 1999.
- Lopez, Mario Canoniga (August–November 1990). "Fighters of the Cross of Christ". Air Enthusiast (13): 13–25. ISSN 0143-5450.
- McKinstry, Leo. Spitfire: Portrait of a Legend. London: John Murray, 2007. ISBN 0-7195-6874-9.
- Morgan, Eric B. and Edward Shacklady. Spitfire: The History (4th rev. edn.). London: Key Publishing, 1993. ISBN 0-946219-10-9.
- Morgan, Eric B. and Edward Shacklady. Spitfire: The History (5th rev. edn.). London: Key Publishing, 2000. ISBN 0-946219-48-6.
- Morison, Samuel Eliot. Breaking the Bismarcks Barrier. History of United States Naval Operations in World War II, Volume 6. Castle Books, 1958. ISBN 0-7858-1307-1
- Moss, Graham and Barry McKee. Spitfires and Polished Metal: Restoring the Classic Fighter. Marlborough, Wiltshire, UK: Airlife, 1999. ISBN 0-7603-0741-5.
- Price, Alfred. "The Birth of a Thoroughbred." Aeroplane, Volume 34, Number 3, No. 395, March 2006.
- Price, Alfred. Late Marque Spitfire Aces 1942–1945. Oxford, UK: Osprey Publishing, 1995. ISBN 1-85532-575-6.
- Price, Alfred. Spitfire: A Documentary History. London: Macdonald and Jane's, 1977. ISBN 0-354-01077-8.
- Price, Alfred. Spitfire a Complete Fighting History. Enderby, Leicester, UK: The Promotional Reprint Company Limited, 1991. ISBN 1-85648-015-1.
- Price, Alfred. The Spitfire Story. London: Jane's Publishing Company Ltd., 1982. ISBN 0-86720-624-1.
- Price, Alfred. The Spitfire Story: Second edition. London: Arms and Armour Press Ltd., 1986. ISBN 0-85368-861-3.
- Price, Alfred. Spitfire: Fighter Supreme. London: Arms and Armour Press, 1991. ISBN 1-85409-056-9.
- Price, Alfred. "Supermarine Spitfire (Merlin-engined variants)". Wings of Fame, Volume 9, 1997, pp. 30–93. London: Aerospace. ISBN 1-86184-001-2.
- Price, Alfred. "Supermarine Spitfire (Griffon-engined variants and Seafire)" Wings of Fame, Volume 16, 1999, pp. 30–85. London: Aerospace. ISBN 1-86184-037-3.
- Price, Alfred. The Spitfire Story: New edited edition. London: Weidenfeld Military, 1999. ISBN 1-85409-514-5.
- Price, Alfred. The Spitfire Story: Revised second edition. Enderby, Leicester, UK: Siverdale Books, 2002. ISBN 978-1-84425-819-2.
- Price, Alfred and Mike Spick. Handbook of Great Aircraft of WW II. Enderby, Leicester, UK: The Promotional Reprint Company Limited, 1997. ISBN 0-7858-0669-5.
- Quill, Jeffrey. Birth of a Legend: The Spitfire. London: Quiller Press, 1986. ISBN 0-907621-64-3.
- Quill, Jeffrey. Spitfire: A Test Pilot's Story. London: John Murray, 1983, New edition: Crecy Publishing 1996, reprinted 1998, 2001, 2005, 2008. ISBN 978-0-947554-72-9
- Rearden, Jim. Koga's Zero: The Fighter That Changed World War II. ISBN 0-929521-56-0, second edition, Missoula, Montana: Pictorial Histories Publishing Company, 1995. Originally published as Cracking the Zero Mystery: How the US Learned to Beat Japan's Vaunted WWII Fighter Plane ISBN 978-0-8117-2235-3.
- Shores, Christopher and Brian Cull with Nicola Malizia. Malta: The Spitfire Year. London: Grub Street, 1991. ISBN 0-948817-16-X.
- Smallwood, Hugh. Spitfire in Blue. London: Osprey Aerospace, 1996. ISBN 1-85532-615-9.
- Spick, Mike. Supermarine Spitfire. New York: Gallery Books, 1990. ISBN 0-8317-1403-4.
- "Spitfire: Simply Superb, Part three." Air International, Volume 28, Number 4, April 1985.
- Stokes, Doug. Paddy Finucane, Fighter Ace: A Biography of Wing Commander Brendan E. Finucane, D.S.O., D.F.C. and Two Bars. London: William Kimber & Co. Ltd., 1983. ISBN 0-7183-0279-6.
- Tanner, John. The Spitfire V Manual (AP1565E reprint). London: Arms and Armour Press, 1981. ISBN 0-85368-420-0.
- Vader, John. Spitfire (Ballantine's Illustrated History of World War II). London: Ballantine's Books, 1969.
- Warnes, Alan (March–April 1999). "Hatzerim Album: Spitfires and Meteors at the Israeli Defence Force Museum". Air Enthusiast (80): 76–77. ISSN 0143-5450.
- Williams, Anthony G. and Dr. Emmanuel Gustin. Flying Guns: World War II. Shrewsbury, UK: Airlife Publishing, 2003. ISBN 1-84037-227-3.
