= List of Supermarine Spitfire topics =

The following articles refer or relate to the subject matter of the Supermarine Spitfire fighter aircraft.

== Variants ==
- Supermarine Spitfire
- Supermarine Spitfire (early Merlin-powered variants)
- Supermarine Spitfire (late Merlin-powered variants)
- Supermarine Spitfire (Griffon-powered variants)
- Supermarine Seafire
- Supermarine Spitfire prototype K5054
- Supermarine Aircraft Spitfire

== History ==
- Supermarine Spitfire operational history
- Supermarine Spitfire variants: specifications, performance and armament

== Spitfire-related lists ==
- List of surviving Supermarine Spitfires
- List of Supermarine Spitfire operators
