= Curtiss P-40 Warhawk =

American WWII fighter

P-40 Warhawk Tomahawk / Kittyhawk
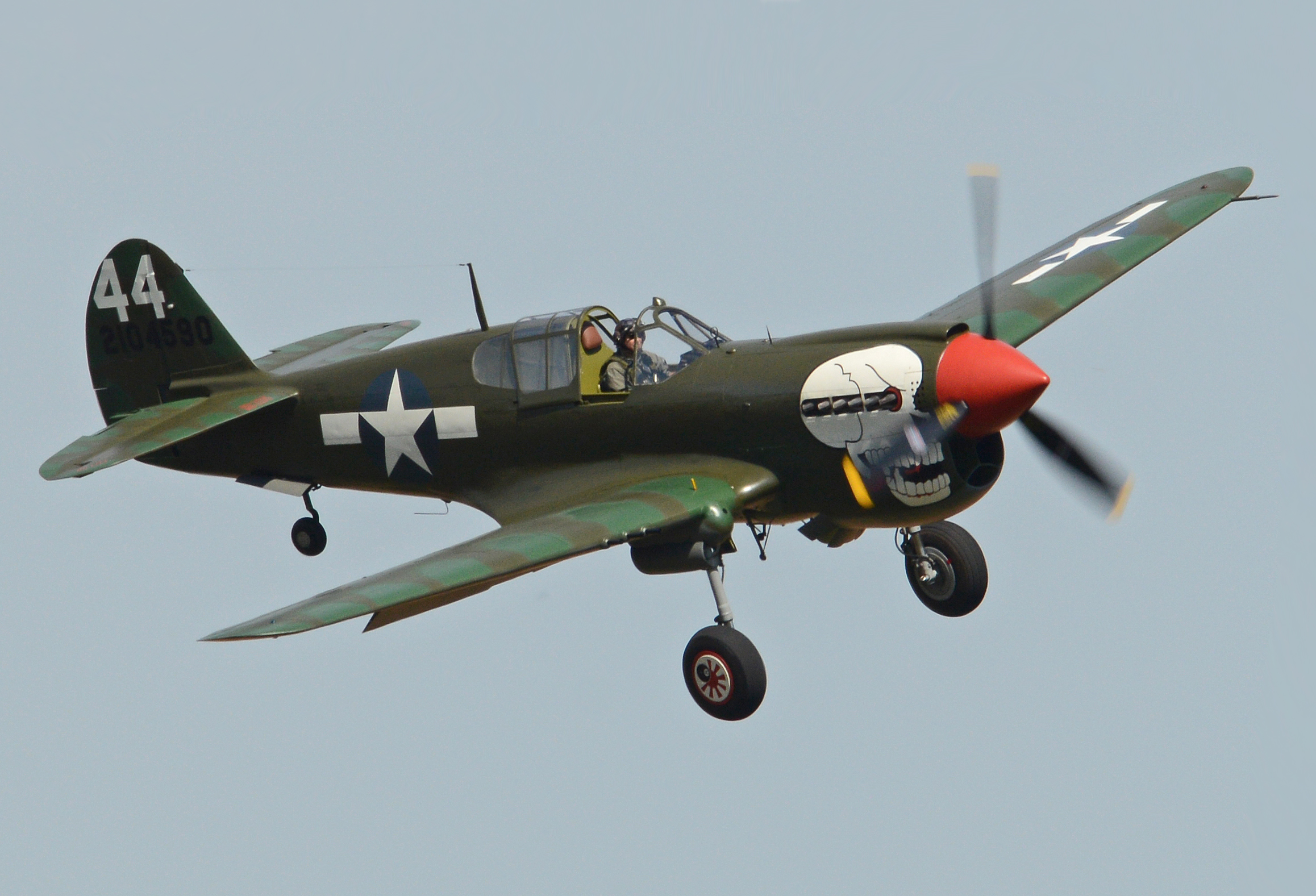
- A restored P-40M Warhawk landing at Season Premier Airshow, in Shuttleworth, UK

General information
- Type: Fighter aircraft
- National origin: United States
- Manufacturer: Curtiss-Wright
- Primary users: United States Army Air Forces Royal Air Force; Royal Australian Air Force; Royal Canadian Air Force
- Number built: 13,738

History
- Manufactured: 1939–1944
- Introduction date: 1939
- First flight: 14 October 1938
- Retired: Brazilian Air Force (1958)
- Developed from: Curtiss P-36 Hawk
- Variant: Curtiss XP-46

The Curtiss P-40 Warhawk is an American single-engined, single-seat, all-metal fighter-bomber that first flew in 1938. The P-40 design was a modification of the previous Curtiss P-36 Hawk which reduced development time and enabled a rapid entry into production and operational service. The Warhawk was used by most Allied powers during World War II, and remained in frontline service until the end of the war. It was the third most-produced American fighter of World War II, after the North American P-51 Mustang and Republic P-47 Thunderbolt; by November 1944, when production of the P-40 ceased, 13,738 had been built, all at Curtiss-Wright Corporation's main production facilities in Buffalo, New York.

The British Commonwealth from 1940 and Soviet air forces used the name Tomahawk for models equivalent to the original P-40, P-40B, and P-40C (Curtiss Model 81), and the name Kittyhawk for models equivalent to the P-40D and all later variants (Curtiss Model 87). P-40 Warhawk was the name the United States Army Air Corps gave the plane; after June 1941, the USAAF adopted the name for all models, making it the official name in the US for all P-40s. P-40s first saw combat with the British Commonwealth squadrons of the Desert Air Force in the Middle East and North African campaigns, during June 1941. No. 112 Squadron Royal Air Force, was among the first to operate Tomahawks in North Africa and the unit was the first Allied military aviation unit to feature the "shark mouth" logo, copying similar markings on some Luftwaffe Messerschmitt Bf 110 twin-engine fighters. (Note: Inspired by 112 Squadron's usage of them in North Africa, and by the Luftwaffe's earlier use of it, both via Allied wartime newspaper and magazine article images, the "shark mouth" logo on the sides of the P-40's nose was most famously used on those of the Flying Tigers in China. The Bf 110s were from II Gruppe/Zerstörergeschwader 76. Shilling, an AVG pilot indicated, "I was looking through a British magazine one day and saw a photo of a Messerschmitt Bf 110 with a shark face on it.")

The lack of a two-speed supercharger for the P-40's Allison V-1710 engine made it inferior to Luftwaffe fighters such as the Messerschmitt Bf 109 or the Focke-Wulf Fw 190 in high-altitude combat and it was rarely used in operations in Northwest Europe. However, between 1941 and 1944, the P-40 played a critical role with Allied air forces in three major theaters: North Africa, the Southwest Pacific, and China. It also had a significant role in the Middle East, Southeast Asia, Eastern Europe, Alaska and Italy. The P-40's performance at high altitudes was not as important in those theaters, where it served as an air superiority fighter, bomber escort and fighter-bomber.

Although it gained a postwar reputation as a mediocre design, suitable only for close air support, more recent research including scrutiny of the records of Allied squadrons indicates that this was not the case; the P-40 performed surprisingly well as an air superiority fighter, at times suffering severe losses, but also inflicting a very heavy toll on enemy aircraft. Based on war-time victory claims, over 200 Allied fighter pilots – from the UK, Australia, New Zealand, Canada, South Africa, the US and the Soviet Union – became aces flying the P-40. These included at least 20 double aces, mostly over North Africa, China, Burma and India, the South West Pacific and Eastern Europe. The P-40 offered the additional advantages of low cost and durability, which kept it in production as a ground-attack aircraft long after it was obsolescent as a fighter.

== Design and development ==
=== Origins ===
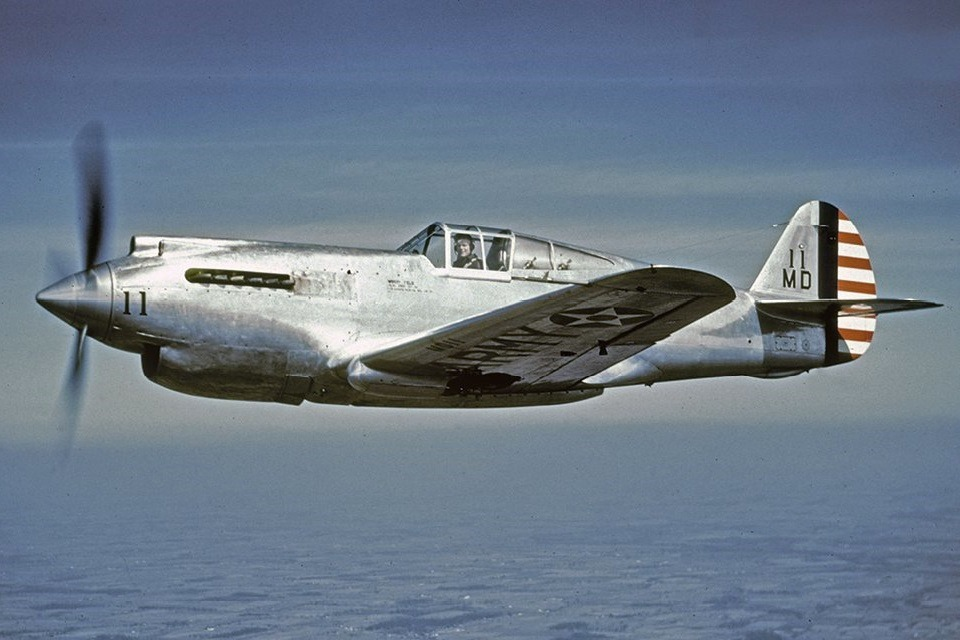
Curtiss XP-40 "11" used for test purposes by the Materiel Division of the US Army Air Corps

On 14 October 1938, Curtiss test pilot Edward Elliott flew the prototype XP-40 on its first flight in Buffalo. The XP-40 was the 10th production Curtiss P-36 Hawk, with its Pratt & Whitney R-1830 Twin Wasp 14-cylinder air-cooled radial engine replaced at the direction of Chief Engineer Don R. Berlin by a liquid-cooled, supercharged Allison V-1710 V-12 engine. The first prototype placed the glycol coolant radiator in an underbelly position on the fighter, just aft of the wing's trailing edge. USAAC Fighter Projects Officer Lieutenant Benjamin S. Kelsey flew this prototype some 300 miles in 57 minutes, approximately 315 miles per hour (507 km/h). Hiding his disappointment, he told reporters that future versions would likely go 100 miles per hour (160 km/h) faster. Kelsey was interested in the Allison engine because it was sturdy and dependable, and it had a smooth, predictable power curve. The V-12 engine offered as much power as a radial engine but had a smaller frontal area and allowed a more streamlined cowl than an aircraft with a radial engine, promising a theoretical 5% increase in top speed.

Curtiss engineers worked to improve the XP-40's speed by moving the radiator forward in steps. Seeing little gain, Kelsey ordered the aircraft to be evaluated in a NACA wind tunnel to identify solutions for better aerodynamic qualities. From 28 March to 11 April 1939, the prototype was studied by NACA. Based on the data obtained, Curtiss moved the glycol coolant radiator forward to the chin; its new air scoop also accommodated the oil cooler air intake. Other improvements to the landing gear doors and the exhaust manifold combined to give performance that was satisfactory to the USAAC. Without beneficial tail winds, Kelsey flew the XP-40 from Wright Field back to Curtiss's plant in Buffalo at an average speed of 354 mph (570 km/h). (Note: Due to the reporter's unfamiliarity with the type, the XP-40 was inaccurately identified as an upgraded P-36.) Further tests in December 1939 proved the fighter could reach 366 mph (589 km/h).

An unusual production feature was a special truck rig to speed delivery at the main Curtiss plant in Buffalo, New York. The rig moved the newly built P-40s in two main components, the main wing and the fuselage, the eight miles from the plant to the airport where the two units were mated for flight and delivery.

=== Performance characteristics ===
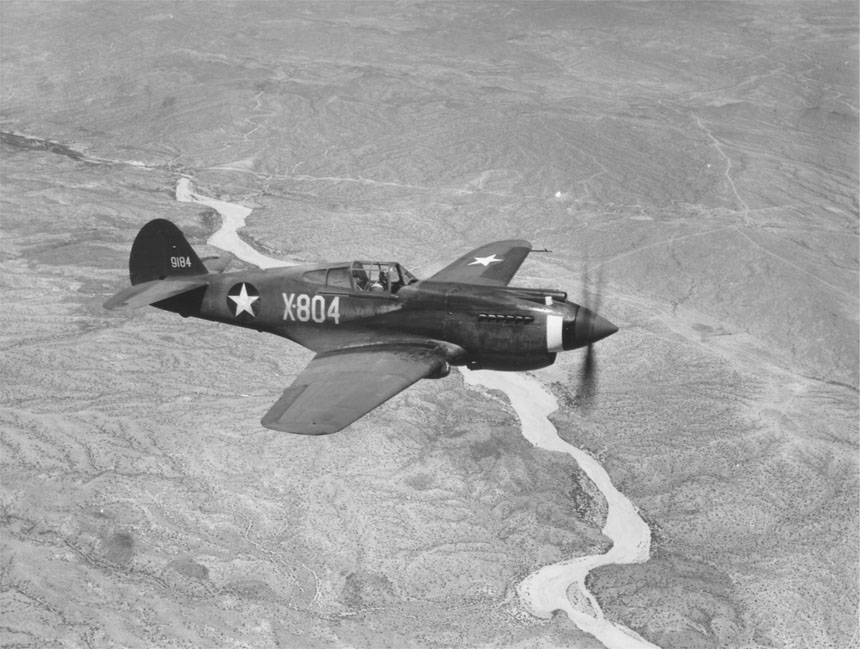
A three-quarter view of a P-40B, X-804 (s/n 39-184) in flight. This aircraft served with an advanced training unit at Luke Field, Arizona.

The P-40 was conceived as a pursuit aircraft and was agile at low and medium altitudes but suffered from a lack of power at higher altitudes. At medium and high speeds it was one of the tightest-turning early monoplane designs of the war, and it could out-turn most opponents it faced in North Africa and the Russian Front. In the Pacific Theater it was out-turned at lower speeds by the lightweight fighters Mitsubishi A6M Zero and Nakajima Ki-43 Hayabusa (known to Allies as "Oscar"). The American Volunteer Group Commander Claire Chennault advised against prolonged dogfighting with the Japanese fighters due to speed reduction favoring the Japanese.

Allison's V-1710 engines produced 1,040 hp (780 kW) at sea level and 14,000 ft (4,300 m). This was not powerful compared with contemporary fighters, and the early P-40 variants' top speeds were only average. The single-stage, single-speed supercharger meant that the P-40 was a poor high-altitude fighter. Later versions, with 1,200 hp (890 kW) Allisons or more powerful 1,400 hp (1,000 kW) Packard Merlin engines were more capable. Climb performance was fair to poor, depending on the subtype. Dive acceleration was good and dive speed was excellent. The highest-scoring P-40 ace, Clive Caldwell (RAAF), who claimed 22 of his 28½ kills in the type, said that the P-40 had "almost no vices", although "it was a little difficult to control in terminal velocity". The P-40 had one of the fastest maximum dive speeds of any fighter of the early war period, and good high-speed handling.

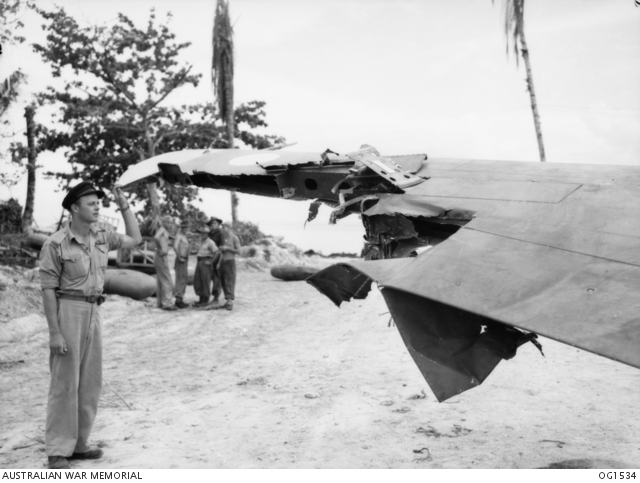
Evidence of the P-40's durability: in 1944 F/O T. R. Jacklin (pictured) flew this No. 75 Squadron RAAF P-40N-5 more than 200 mi (322 km) after the loss of the port aileron and 25% of its wing area, due to a mid-air collision with another P-40N-5. (Note: The fighter was repaired and served out the war.)

The P-40 tolerated harsh conditions and a variety of climates. Its semi-modular design was easy to maintain in the field. It lacked innovations such as boosted ailerons or automatic leading edge slats, but its strong structure included a five-spar wing, which enabled P-40s to pull high-G turns and survive some midair collisions. Intentional ramming attacks against enemy aircraft were occasionally recorded as victories by the Desert Air Force and Soviet Air Forces. Caldwell said P-40s "would take a tremendous amount of punishment, violent aerobatics as well as enemy action". Operational range was good by early war standards and was almost double that of the Supermarine Spitfire or Messerschmitt Bf 109, although inferior to the Mitsubishi A6M Zero, Nakajima Ki-43 and Lockheed P-38 Lightning.

Caldwell found the P-40C Tomahawk's armament of two .50-inch (12.7 mm) Browning AN/M2 "light-barrel" dorsal nose-mount synchronized machine guns and two .303-inch (7.7 mm) Browning machine guns in each wing to be inadequate. This was improved with the P-40D (Kittyhawk I) which abandoned the synchronized gun mounts and instead had two .50-inch (12.7 mm) guns in each wing, although Caldwell still preferred the earlier Tomahawk in other respects. The D had armor around the engine and the cockpit, which enabled it to withstand considerable damage. This allowed Allied pilots in Asia and the Pacific to attack Japanese fighters head on, rather than try to out-turn and out-climb their opponents. Late-model P-40s were well armored. Visibility was adequate, although hampered by a complex windscreen frame, and completely blocked to the rear in early models by a raised turtledeck. Poor ground visibility and relatively narrow landing gear track caused many losses on the ground.

Curtiss tested a follow-on design, the Curtiss XP-46, but it offered little improvement over newer P-40 models and was cancelled.

== Operational history ==
In April 1939, the US Army Air Corps, having witnessed the new, sleek, high-speed, in-line-engined fighters of the European air forces, placed the largest fighter order it had ever made for 524 P-40s.

=== French Air Force ===
An early order came from the French Armée de l'Air, which was already operating P-36s. The Armée de l'Air ordered 100 (later the order was increased to 230) as the Hawk 81A-1 but the French were defeated before the aircraft had left the factory and the aircraft were diverted to British and Commonwealth service (as the Tomahawk I), in some cases complete with metric flight instruments.

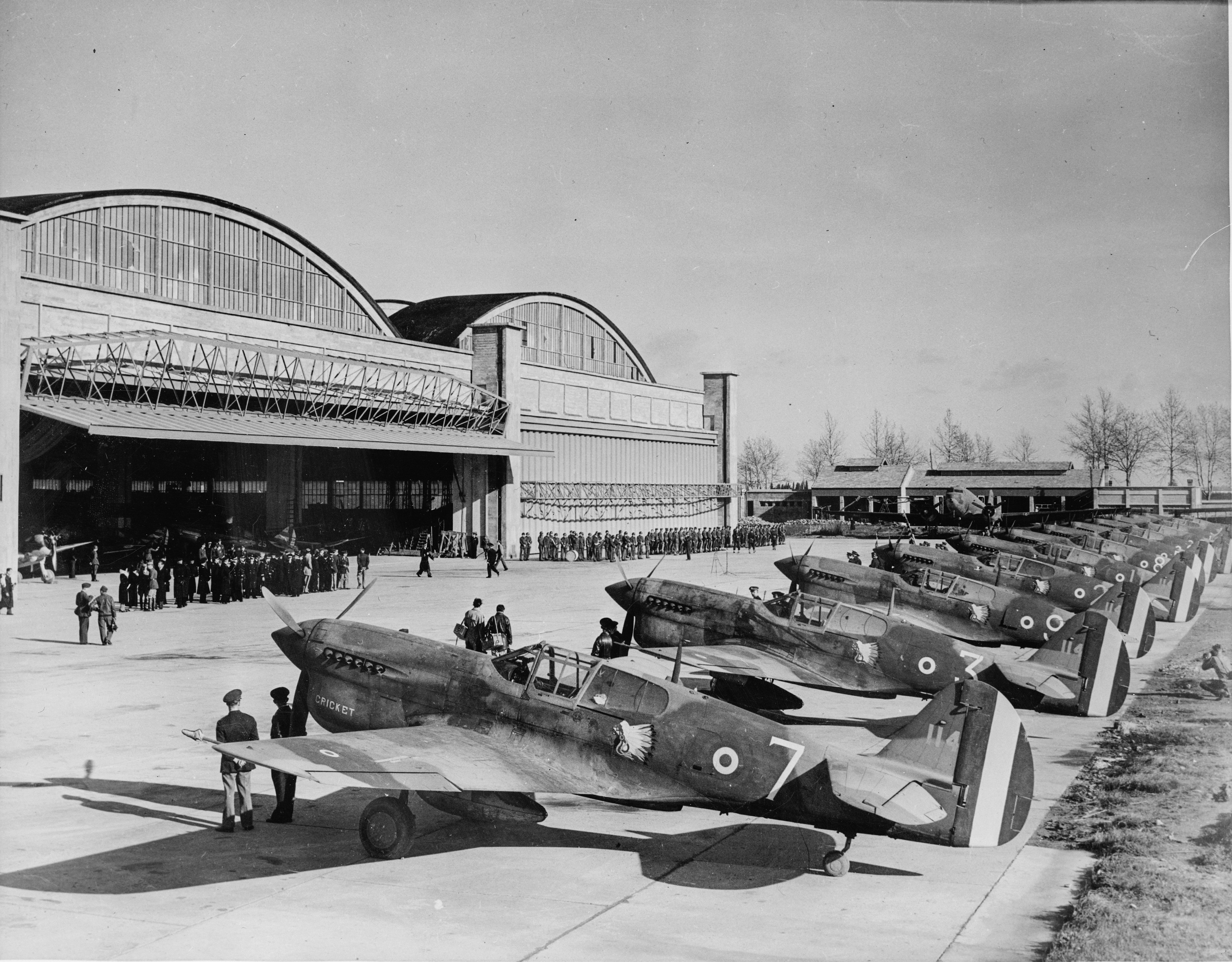
12 Curtiss P-40F Warhawk fighters on 9 January 1943 in Casablanca during the ceremony marking their official transfer to French forces.

In late 1942, as French forces in North Africa split from the Vichy government to side with the Allies, US forces transferred P-40Fs from 33rd FG to GC II/5, a squadron that was historically associated with the Lafayette Escadrille. GC II/5 used its P-40Fs and Ls in combat in Tunisia and later for patrol duty off the Mediterranean coast until mid-1944, when they were replaced by Republic P-47D Thunderbolts.

=== British Commonwealth ===
==== Deployment ====
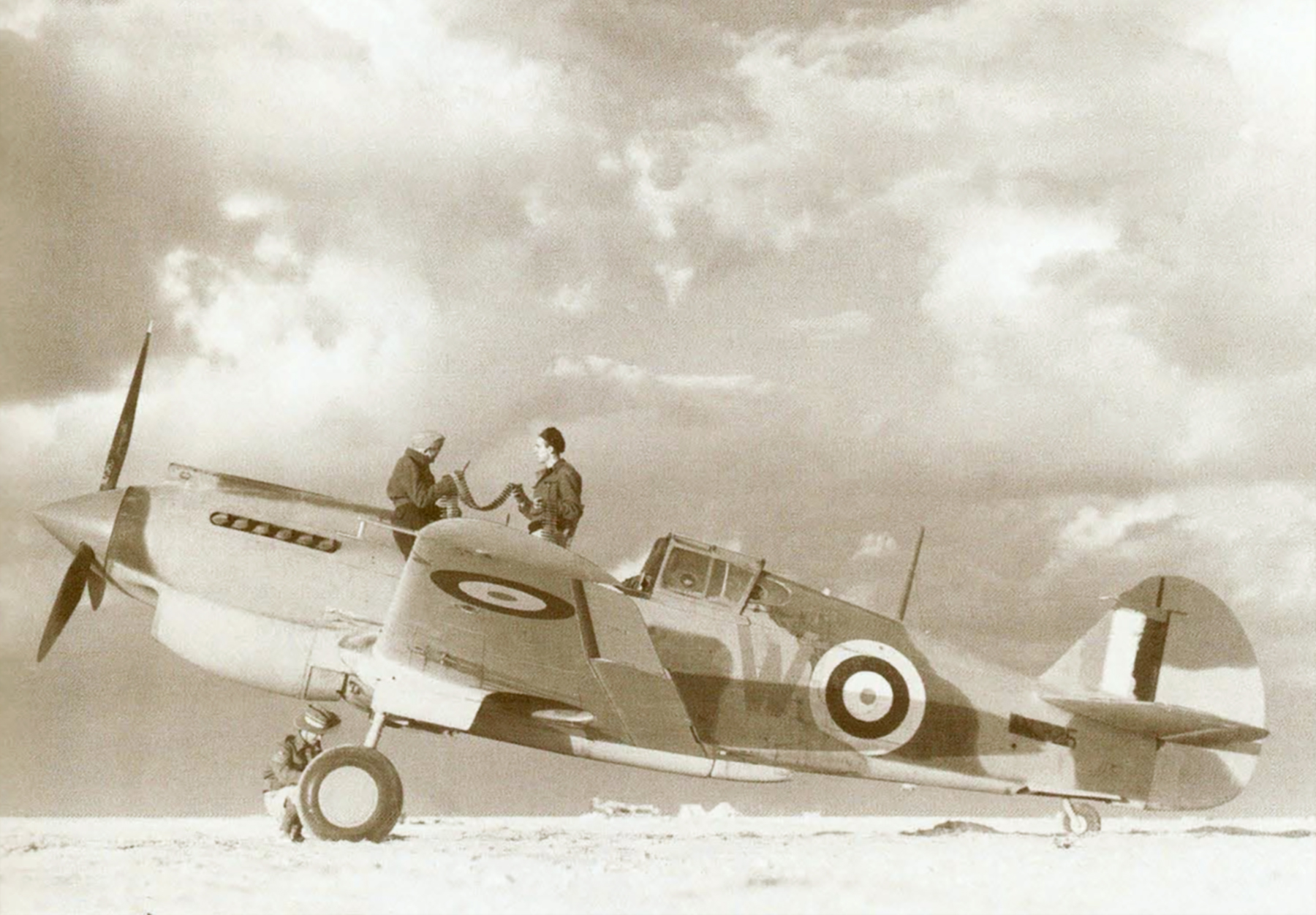
Armourers working on a Tomahawk Mk.II from No. 3 Squadron RAAF in North Africa, 23 December 1941

In all, 18 Royal Air Force (RAF) squadrons, four Royal Canadian Air Force (RCAF), three South African Air Force (SAAF) and two Royal Australian Air Force (RAAF) squadrons serving with RAF formations, used P-40s. The first units to convert were Hawker Hurricane squadrons of the Desert Air Force (DAF), in early 1941. The first Tomahawks delivered came without armor, bulletproof windscreens or self-sealing fuel tanks, which were installed in subsequent shipments. Pilots used to British fighters sometimes found it difficult to adapt to the P-40's rear-folding landing gear, which was more prone to collapse than the lateral-folding landing gear of the Hurricane or Supermarine Spitfire. In contrast to the "three-point landing" commonly employed with British types, P-40 pilots were obliged to use a "wheels landing": a longer, low angle approach that touched down on the main wheels first.

Testing showed the aircraft did not have the performance needed for use in Northwest Europe at high-altitude, due to the service ceiling limitation. Spitfires used in the theater operated at heights around 30,000 ft (9,100 m), while the P-40's Allison engine, with its single-stage, low altitude rated supercharger, worked best at 15,000 ft (4,600 m) or lower. When the Tomahawk was used by Allied units based in the UK from February 1941, this limitation relegated the Tomahawk to low-level reconnaissance with RAF Army Cooperation Command and only No. 403 Squadron RCAF was used in the fighter role for a mere 29 sorties, before being replaced by Spitfires. Air Ministry deemed the P-40 unsuitable for the theater. UK P-40 squadrons from mid-1942 re-equipped with aircraft such as Mustangs.

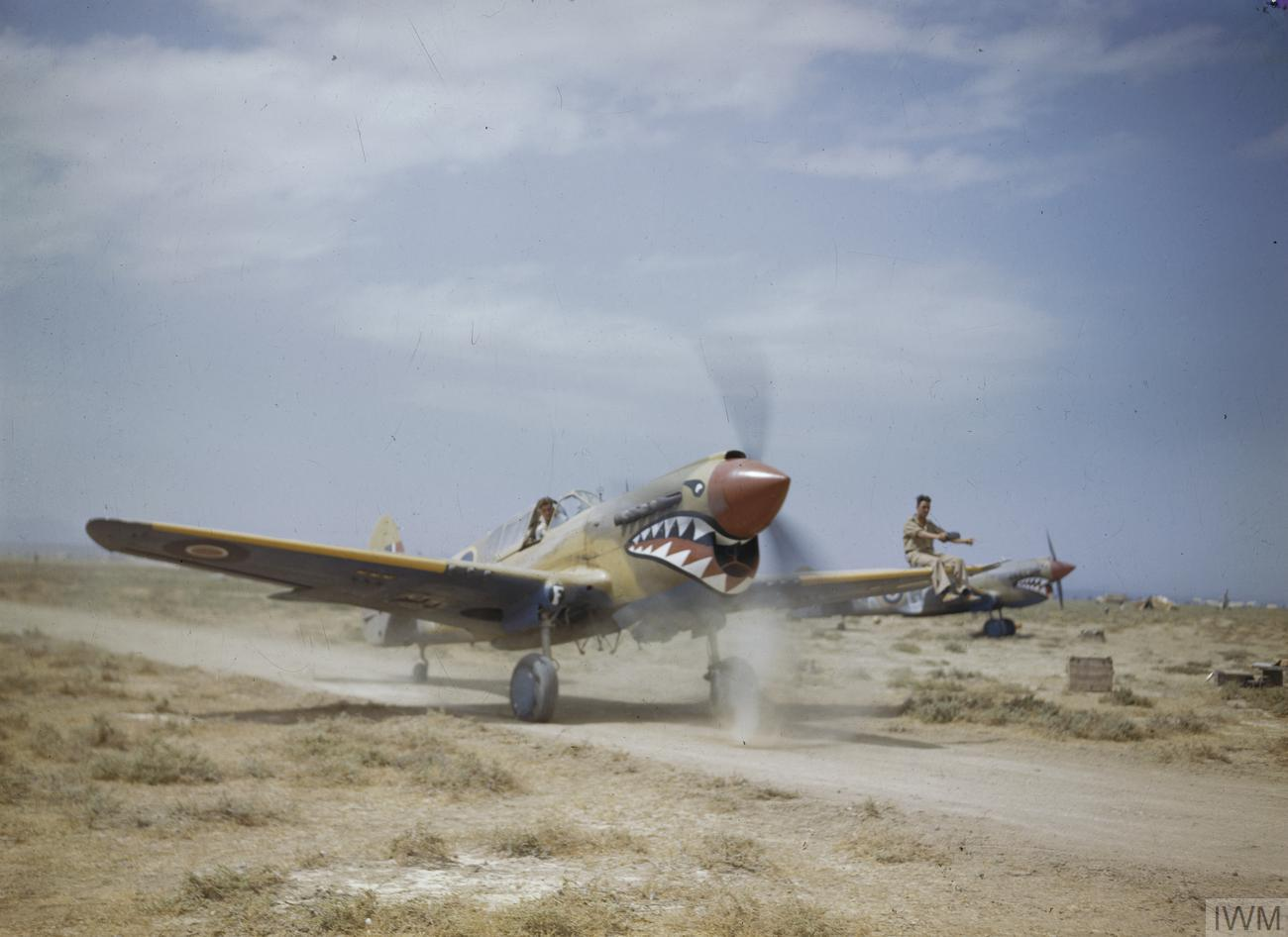
A Kittyhawk Mk III of No. 112 Squadron RAF, taxiing at Medenine, Tunisia, in 1943. The ground crewman on the wing is directing the pilot, whose forward view is hindered by the aircraft's nose.

The Tomahawk was superseded in North Africa by the more powerful Kittyhawk ("D"-mark onwards) types from early 1942, though some Tomahawks remained in service until 1943. Kittyhawks included many improvements and were the DAF's air superiority fighter for the critical first few months of 1942, until "tropicalised" Supermarine Spitfires were available. DAF units received nearly 330 Packard V-1650 Merlin-powered P-40Fs, called Kittyhawk IIs, most of which went to the USAAF and the majority of the 700 "lightweight" L models, also powered by the Packard Merlin, in which the armament was reduced to four.50 in (12.7 mm) Brownings (Kittyhawk IIA). The DAF also received some 21 of the later P-40K and the majority of the 600 P-40Ms built; these were known as Kittyhawk IIIs. The "lightweight" P-40Ns (Kittyhawk IV) arrived from early 1943 and were used mostly as fighter-bombers. (Note: Late P-40Fs and most Ks, Ls and the P-40Ms had lengthened rear fuselages; the F/Ls had no carburettor air scoop on the upper engine cowling.) From July 1942 until mid-1943, elements of the US 57th Fighter Group (57th FG) were attached to DAF P-40 units. The British government also donated 23 P-40s to the Soviet Union.

==== Combat performance ====
Tomahawks and Kittyhawks bore the brunt of Luftwaffe and Regia Aeronautica fighter attacks during the North African campaign. The P-40s were considered superior to the Hurricane, which they replaced as the primary fighter of the Desert Air Force.

I would evade being shot at accurately by pulling so much g-force...that you could feel the blood leaving the head and coming down over your eyes... And you would fly like that for as long as you could, knowing that if anyone was trying to get on your tail they were going through the same bleary vision that you had and you might get away... I had deliberately decided that any deficiency the Kittyhawk had was offset by aggression. And I'd done a little bit of boxing – I beat much better opponents simply by going for [them]. And I decided to use that in the air. And it paid off.

— Nicky Barr, 3 Sqn RAAF

The P-40 initially proved quite effective against Axis aircraft and contributed to a slight shift of advantage in the Allies' favor. The gradual replacement of Hurricanes by the Tomahawks and Kittyhawks led to the Luftwaffe accelerating retirement of the Bf 109E and introducing the newer Bf 109F; these were to be flown by the veteran pilots of elite Luftwaffe units, such as Jagdgeschwader 27 (JG27), in North Africa. The P-40 was generally considered roughly equal or slightly superior to the Bf 109 at low altitude but inferior at high altitude, particularly against the Bf 109F. Most air combat in North Africa took place well below 16,000 ft (4,900 m), negating much of the Bf 109's superiority. The P-40 usually had an advantage over the Bf 109 in turning, dive speed and structural strength, was roughly equal in firepower but was slightly inferior in speed and outclassed in rate of climb and operational ceiling.

The P-40 was generally superior to early Italian fighter types, such as the Fiat G.50 Freccia and the Macchi C.200. Its performance against the Macchi C.202 Folgore elicited varying opinions. Some observers consider the Macchi C.202 superior. Caldwell, who scored victories against them in his P-40, felt that the Folgore was superior to the P-40 and the Bf 109 except that its armament of only two or four machine guns was inadequate. Other observers considered the two equally matched or favored the Folgore in aerobatic performance, such as turning radius. The aviation historian Walter J. Boyne wrote that over Africa, the P-40 and the Folgore were "equivalent". Against its lack of high-altitude performance, the P-40 was considered to be a stable gun platform and its rugged construction meant that it was able to operate from rough front line airstrips with a good rate of serviceability.

The earliest victory claims by P-40 pilots include Vichy French aircraft, during the 1941 Syria-Lebanon campaign, against Dewoitine D.520s, a type often considered to be the best French fighter of the war. The P-40 was deadly against Axis bombers in the theater, as well as against the Bf 110 twin-engine fighter. In June 1941, Caldwell, of 250 Squadron in Egypt, flying as flying Officer (F/O) Jack Hamlyn's wingman, recorded in his log book that he was involved in the first air combat victory for the P-40. This was a CANT Z.1007 bomber on 6 June. The claim was not officially recognized, as the crash of the CANT was not witnessed. The first official victory occurred on 8 June, when Hamlyn and Flight Sergeant (Flt Sgt) Tom Paxton destroyed a CANT Z.1007 from 211^{a} Squadriglia of the Regia Aeronautica, over Alexandria. Several days later, the Tomahawk was in action over Syria with No. 3 Squadron RAAF, which claimed 19 aerial victories over Vichy French aircraft during June and July 1941, for the loss of one P-40 (and one lost to ground fire).

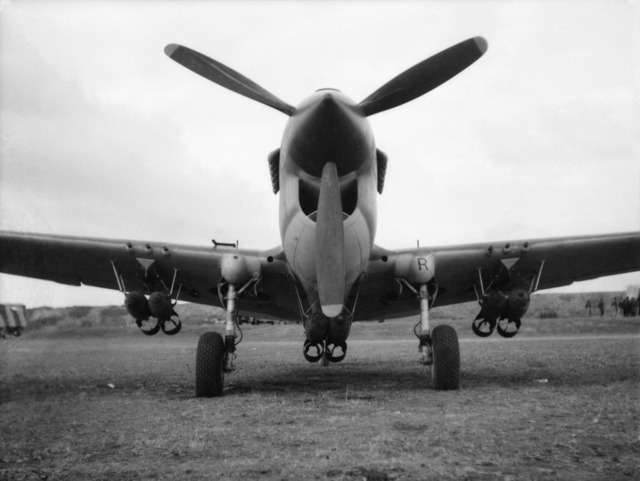
North Africa, c. 1943. A P-40 "Kittybomber" of No. 450 Squadron RAAF, loaded with six 250 lb (110 kg) bombs.

Some DAF units initially failed to use the P-40's strengths or used outdated defensive tactics such as the Lufbery circle. The superior climb rate of the Bf 109 enabled fast, swooping attacks, neutralizing the advantages offered by conventional defensive tactics. Various new formations were tried by Tomahawk units from 1941 to 1942, including "fluid pairs" (similar to the German rotte); the Thach Weave (one or two "weavers") at the back of a squadron in formation and whole squadrons bobbing and weaving in loose formations. Werner Schröer, who was credited with destroying 114 Allied aircraft in only 197 combat missions, referred to the latter formation as "bunches of grapes", because he found them so easy to pick off. The leading German expert in North Africa, Hans-Joachim Marseille, claimed as many as 101 P-40s during his career.

From 26 May 1942, Kittyhawk units operated primarily as fighter-bomber units, giving rise to the nickname "Kittybomber". As a result of this change in role and because DAF P-40 squadrons were frequently used in bomber escort and close air support missions, they suffered relatively high losses; many Desert Air Force P-40 pilots were caught flying low and slow by marauding Bf 109s.

Victory claims and losses for three Tomahawk/Kittyhawk squadrons of the Desert Air Force, June 1941 – May 1943.
Unit	3 Sqn RAAF	112 Sqn RAF	450 Sqn RAAF (Note: Began conversion to P-40s in December 1941; operational in February 1942.)
Claims with Tomahawks	41	36	–
Claims with Kittyhawks	74.5	82.5	49
Total P-40 claims	115.5	118.5	49
P-40 losses (total)	34	38	28

Caldwell believed that Operational Training Units did not properly prepare pilots for air combat in the P-40 and as a commander, stressed the importance of training novice pilots properly.

Competent pilots who took advantage of the P-40's strengths were effective against the best of the Luftwaffe and Regia Aeronautica. In August 1941, Caldwell was attacked by two Bf 109s, one of them piloted by German ace Werner Schröer. Although Caldwell was wounded three times and his Tomahawk was hit by more than 100 7.92 mm (0.312 in) bullets and five 20 mm cannon shells, Caldwell shot down Schröer's wingman and returned to base. Some sources also claim that in December 1941, Caldwell killed a prominent German Experte, Erbo von Kageneck (69 kills), while flying a P-40. (Note: Kageneck's brother, August Graf von Kageneck, who corresponded with Caldwell after the war, was among those who believed that Caldwell shot down Erbo.) Caldwell's victories in North Africa included 10 Bf 109s and two Macchi C.202s. Billy Drake of 112 Squadron was the leading British P-40 ace with 13 victories. James "Stocky" Edwards (RCAF), who achieved 12 kills in the P-40 in North Africa, shot down German ace Otto Schulz (51 kills) while flying a Kittyhawk with No. 260 Squadron RAF. Caldwell, Drake, Edwards and Nicky Barr were among at least a dozen pilots who achieved ace status twice over while flying the P-40. A total of 46 British Commonwealth pilots became aces in P-40s, including seven double aces.

=== Chinese Air Force ===
==== Flying Tigers (American Volunteer Group) ====
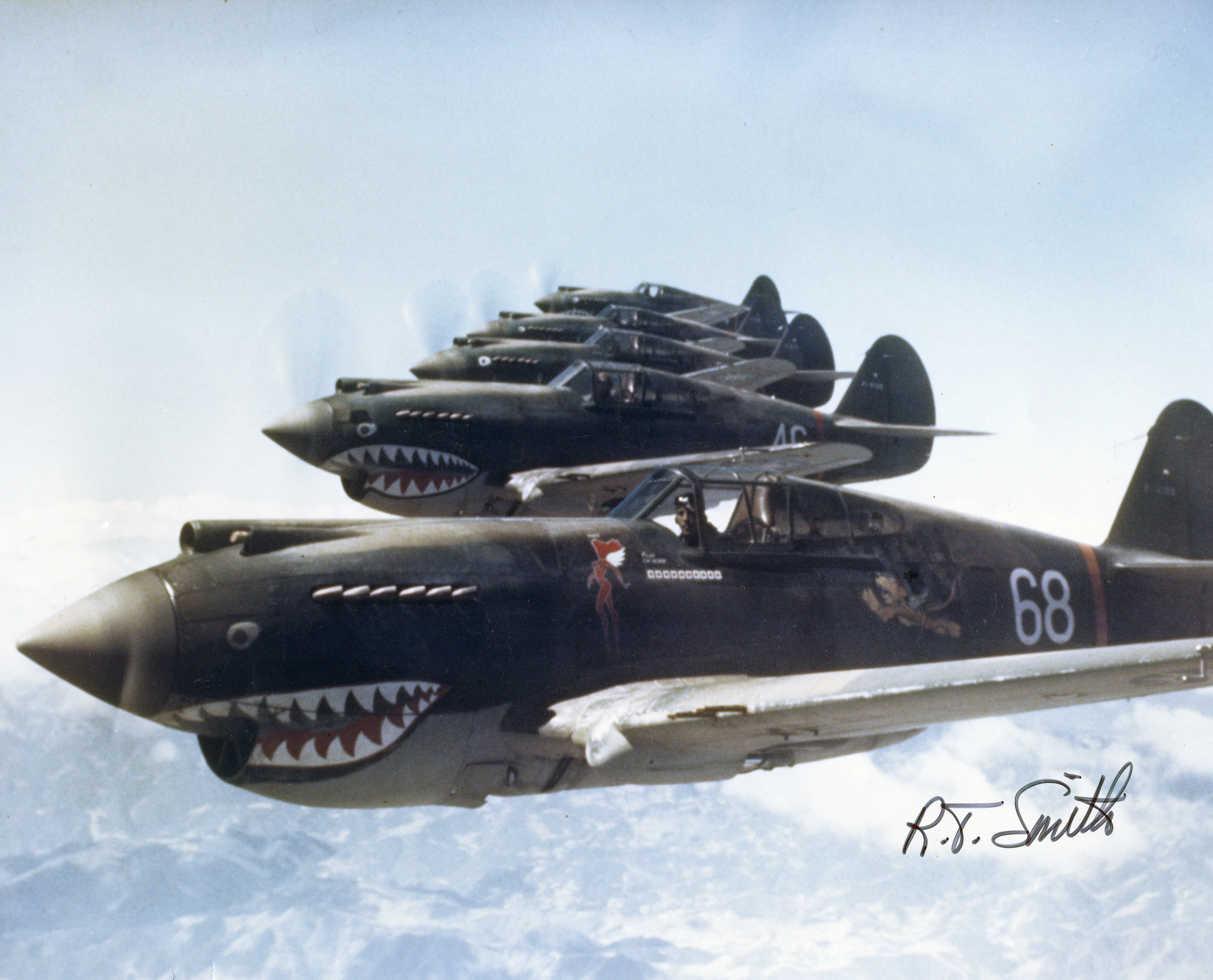
3rd Squadron Hell's Angels, Flying Tigers over China, photographed in 1942 by AVG pilot Robert T. Smith. (Note: Smith commented on the challenge of taking this photo while "scanning the surrounding sky every few seconds to make sure no Jap fighters were about to ambush us".)

The Flying Tigers, known officially as the 1st American Volunteer Group (AVG), were a unit of the Chinese Air Force, recruited from amongst US Navy, Marine Corps and Army aviators and ground crew.

AVG leader Claire Chennault received crated Model Bs which his airmen assembled in Burma at the end of 1941, adding self-sealing fuel tanks and a second pair of wing guns, such that the aircraft became a hybrid of B and C models. These were not well-liked by their pilots: they lacked drop tanks for extra range, and there were no bomb racks on the wings. Chennault considered the liquid-cooled engine vulnerable in combat because a single bullet through the coolant system would cause the engine to overheat in minutes. The Tomahawks also had no radios, so the AVG improvised by installing a fragile radio transceiver, the RCA-7-H, which had been built for a Piper Cub. Because the plane had a single-stage low-altitude supercharger, its effective ceiling was about 25,000 feet (7,600 m). The most critical problem was the lack of spare parts; the only source was from damaged aircraft. The planes were viewed as cast-offs that no one else wanted, dangerous and difficult to fly. But the pilots did appreciate some of the planes' features. There were two heavy sheets of steel behind the pilot's head and back that offered solid protection, and overall the planes were ruggedly constructed.

Compared to opposing Japanese fighters, the P-40B's strengths were that it was sturdy, well-armed, faster in a dive and possessed an excellent rate of roll. While the P-40s could not match the maneuverability of the Japanese Army air arm's Nakajima Ki-27s and Ki-43s, nor the much more famous Zero naval fighter in slow, turning dogfights, at higher speeds the P-40s were more than a match. Chennault trained his pilots to use the P-40's particular performance advantages. The P-40 had a higher dive speed than any Japanese fighter aircraft of the early war years, for example, and could exploit so-called "boom-and-zoom" tactics. The AVG was highly successful, and its feats were widely publicized by an active cadre of international journalists to boost sagging public morale at home. According to its official records, in just 6 1/2 months, the Flying Tigers destroyed 297 enemy aircraft for the loss of just four of its own in air-to-air combat.

In early 1942, the AVG received a small number of Model E's. Each came equipped with a radio, six.50-caliber machine guns, and auxiliary bomb racks that could hold 35-lb fragmentation bombs. Chennault's armorer added bomb racks for 570-lb Russian bombs, which the Chinese had in abundance. These planes were used in the battle of the Salween River Gorge in late May 1942, which kept the Japanese from entering China from Burma and threatening Kunming. Spare parts, however, remained in short supply. "Scores of new planes...were now in India, and there they stayed—in case the Japanese decided to invade... the AVG was lucky to get a few tires and spark plugs with which to carry on its daily war."

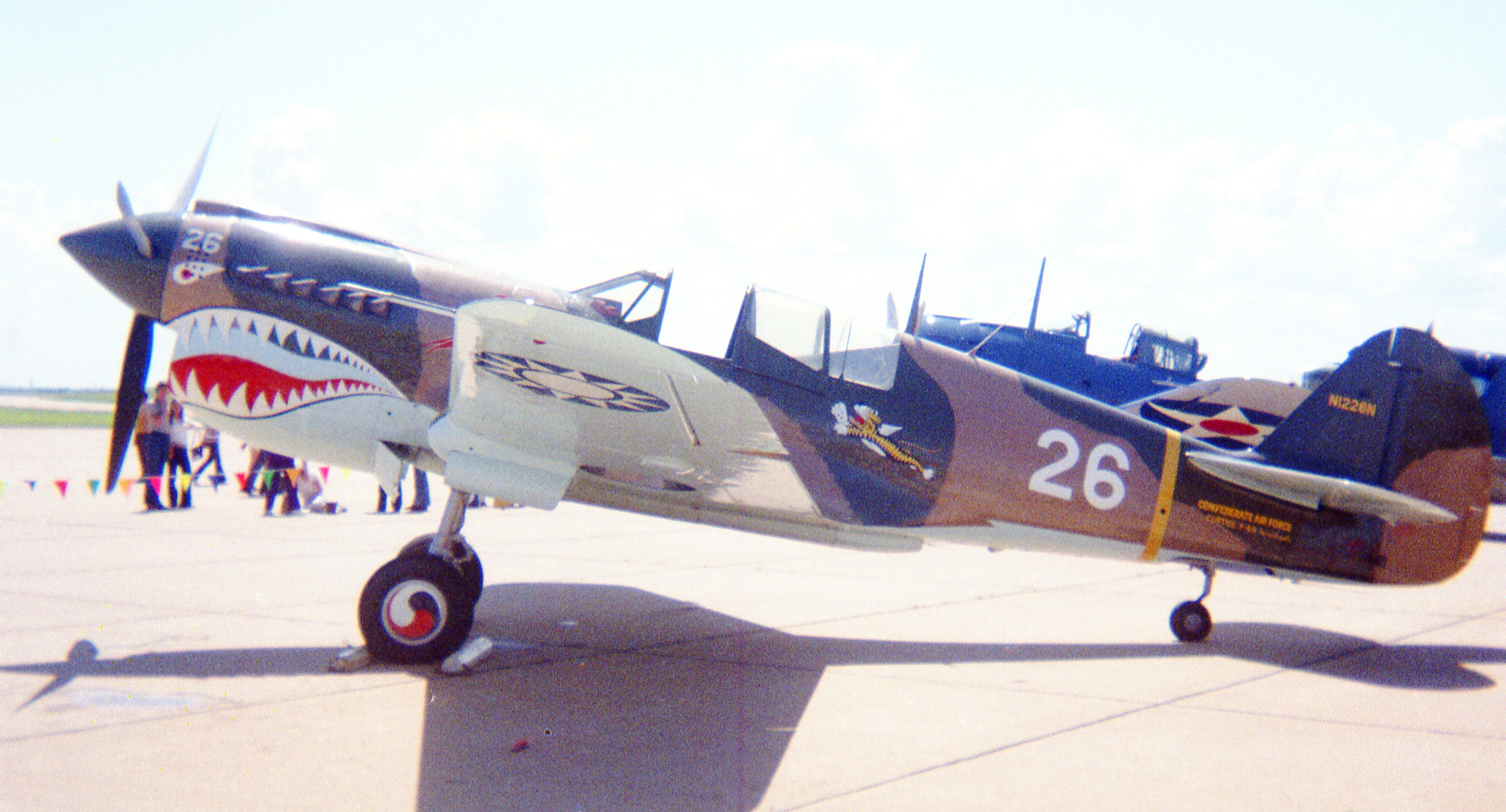
P-40N Warhawk N1226N, restored in the markings of the American Volunteer Group (AVG). Confederate Air Force air show, Greater Southwest International Airport (AKA Amon Carter Field), Tarrant County, Texas, 1969.

==== 4th Air Group ====
China received 27 P-40E models in early 1943. These were assigned to squadrons of the 4th Air Group.

=== United States Army Air Forces ===
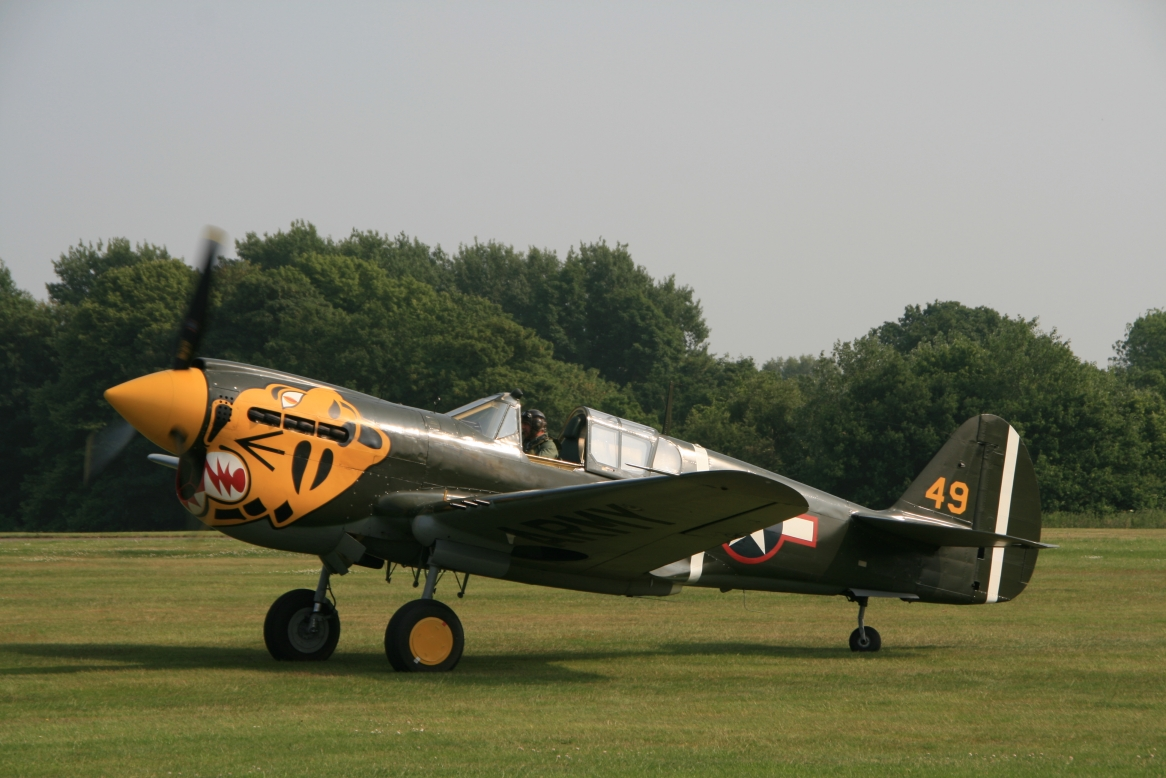
P-40K 42–10256 in Aleutian "Tiger" markings.

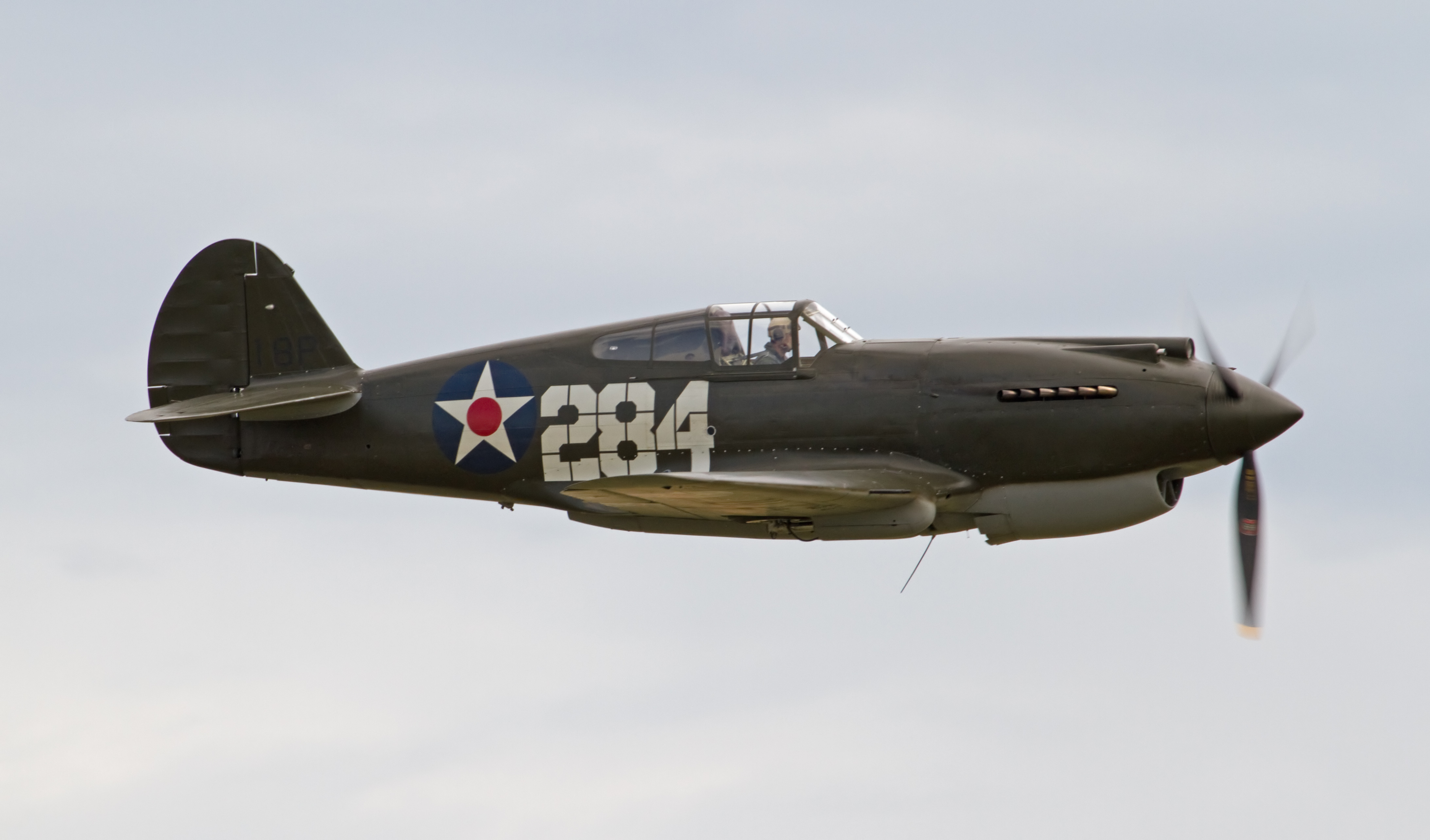
P-40B G-CDWH at Duxford 2011. It is the only airworthy P-40B in the world and the only survivor from the Pearl Harbor attack.

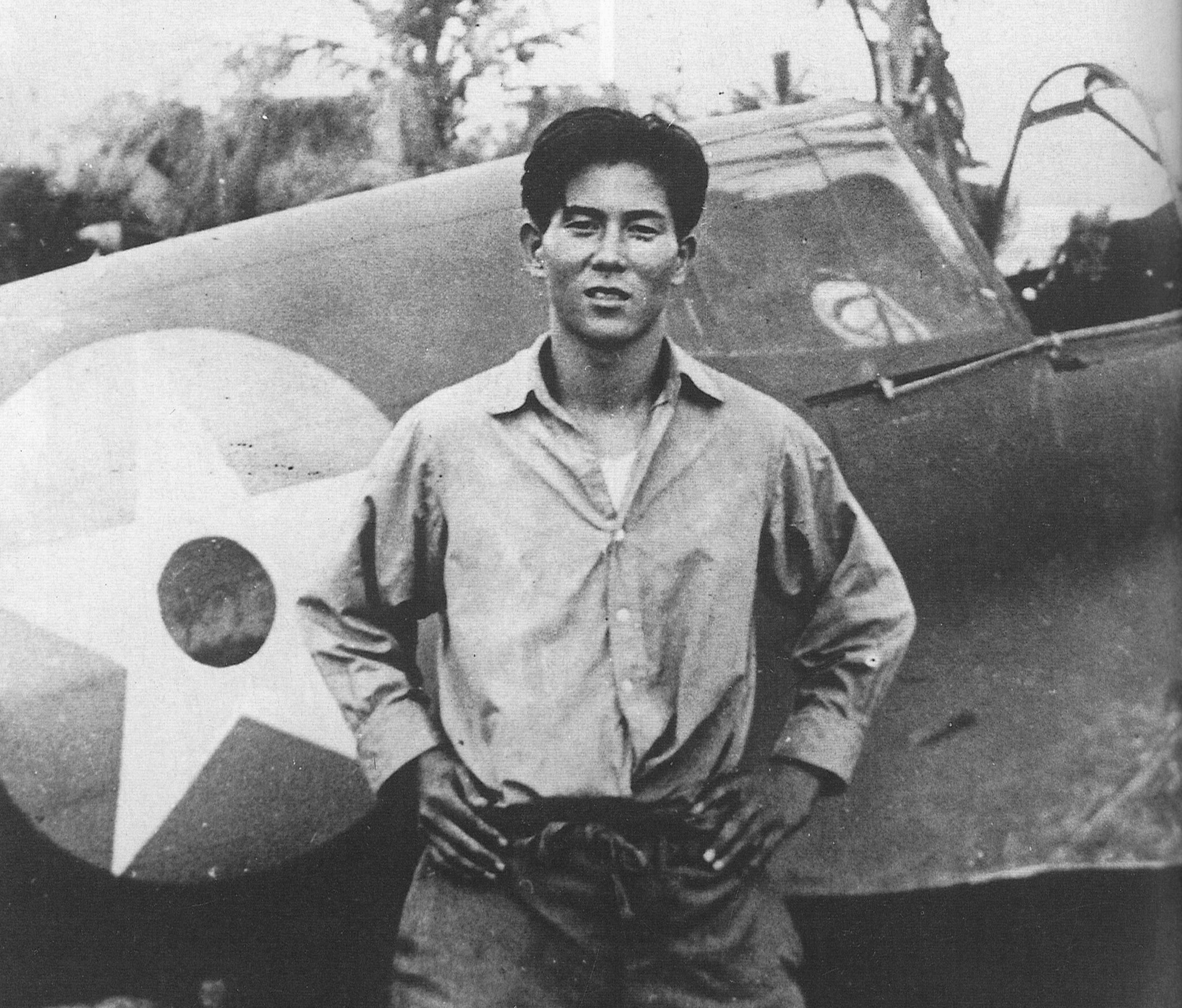
Junichi Sasai and a captured P-40B in the Dutch East Indies, 1942

A total of 15 USAAF pursuit/fighter groups (FG), along with other pursuit/fighter squadrons and a few tactical reconnaissance (TR) units, operated the P-40 during 1941–45. As was also the case with the Bell P-39 Airacobra, many USAAF officers considered the P-40 exceptional but it was gradually replaced by the Lockheed P-38 Lightning, the Republic P-47 Thunderbolt and the North American P-51 Mustang. The bulk of the fighter operations by the USAAF in 1942–43 were borne by the P-40 and the P-39. In the Pacific, these two fighters, along with the US Navy Grumman F4F Wildcat, contributed more than any other US types to breaking Japanese air power during this critical period.

==== Pacific theaters ====
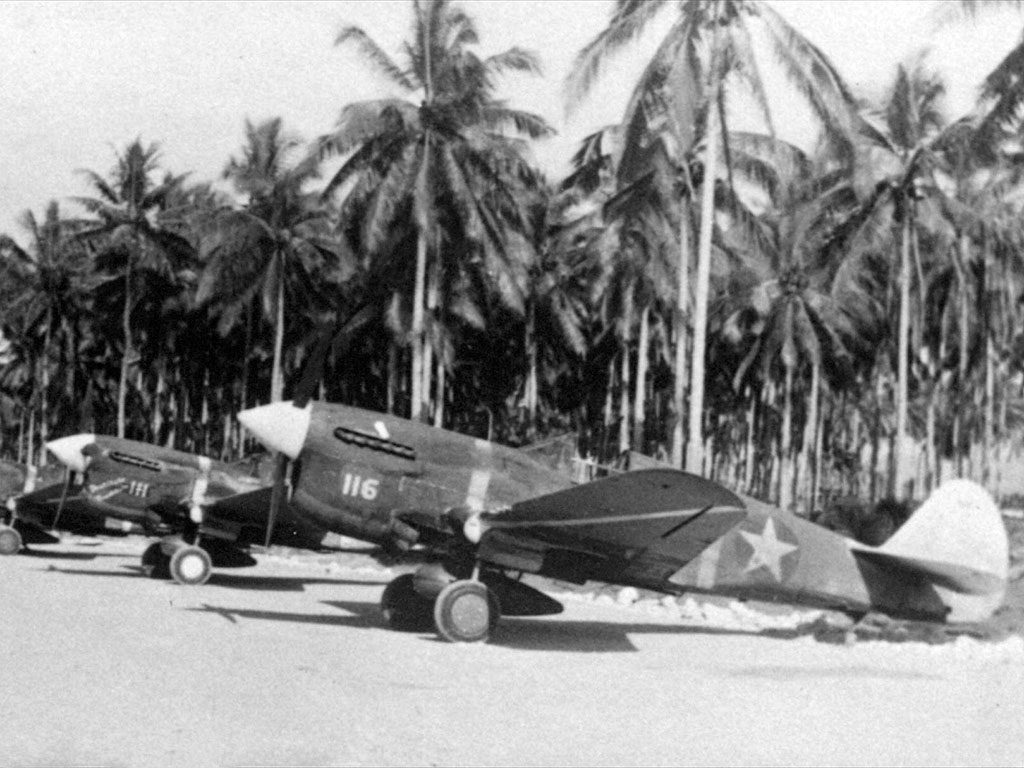
By mid-1943, the USAAF was phasing out the P-40F (pictured); the two nearest aircraft, "White 116" and "White 111" were flown by the aces 1Lt Henry E. Matson and 1Lt Jack Bade, 44th FS, at the time part of AirSols, on Guadalcanal

The P-40 was the main USAAF fighter aircraft in the South West Pacific and Pacific Ocean theaters during 1941–42. At Pearl Harbor and in the Philippines, USAAF P-40 squadrons suffered crippling losses on the ground and in the air to Japanese fighters such as the A6M Zero and Ki-43 Hayabusa respectively. During the attack on Pearl Harbor, most of the USAAF fighters were P-40Bs, the majority of which were destroyed. However, a few P-40s managed to get in the air and shoot down several Japanese aircraft, most notably by George Welch and Kenneth Taylor.

In the Dutch East Indies campaign, the 17th Pursuit Squadron (Provisional), formed from USAAF pilots evacuated from the Philippines, claimed 49 Japanese aircraft destroyed, for the loss of 17 P-40s The seaplane tender USS Langley was sunk by Japanese airplanes while delivering P-40s to Tjilatjap, Java. In the Solomon Islands and New Guinea Campaigns and the air defence of Australia, improved tactics and training allowed the USAAF to better use the strengths of the P-40. Due to aircraft fatigue, scarcity of spare parts and replacement problems, the US Fifth Air Force and Royal Australian Air Force created a joint P-40 management and replacement pool on 30 July 1942 and many P-40s went back and forth between the air forces.

The 49th Fighter Group was in action in the Pacific from the beginning of the war. Robert M. DeHaven scored 10 kills (of 14 overall) in the P-40 with the 49th FG. He compared the P-40 favorably with the P-38:

"If you flew wisely, the P-40 was a very capable aircraft. [It] could outturn a P-38, a fact that some pilots didn't realize when they made the transition between the two aircraft. [...] The real problem with it was lack of range. As we pushed the Japanese back, P-40 pilots were slowly left out of the war. So when I moved to P-38s, an excellent aircraft, I did not [believe] that the P-40 was an inferior fighter, but because I knew the P-38 would allow us to reach the enemy. I was a fighter pilot and that was what I was supposed to do."

The 8th, 15th, 18th, 24th, 49th, 343rd and 347th PGs/FGs, flew P-40s in the Pacific theaters between 1941 and 1945, with most units converting to P-38s from 1943 to 1944. In 1945, the 71st Reconnaissance Group employed them as armed forward air controllers during ground operations in the Philippines, until it received delivery of P-51s. They claimed 655 aerial victories.

Contrary to conventional wisdom, with sufficient altitude, the P-40 could turn with the A6M and other Japanese fighters, using a combination of a nose-down vertical turn with a bank turn, a technique known as a low yo-yo. Robert DeHaven describes how this tactic was used in the 49th Fighter group:

[Y]ou could fight a Jap on even terms, but you had to make him fight your way. He could outturn you at slow speed. You could outturn him at high speed. When you got into a turning fight with him, you dropped your nose down so you kept your airspeed up, you could outturn him. At low speed he could outroll you because of those big ailerons ... on the Zero. If your speed was up over 275, you could outroll [a Zero]. His big ailerons didn't have the strength to make high speed rolls... You could push things, too. Because ... [i]f you decided to go home, you could go home. He couldn't because you could outrun him. [...] That left you in control of the fight.

==== China Burma India Theater ====
USAAF and Chinese P-40 pilots performed well in this theater against many Japanese types such as the Ki-43, Nakajima Ki-44 "Tojo" and the Zero. The P-40 remained in use in the China Burma India Theater (CBI) until 1944 and was reportedly preferred over the P-51 Mustang by some US pilots flying in China. The American Volunteer Group (Flying Tigers) was integrated into the USAAF as the 23rd Fighter Group in June 1942. The unit continued to fly newer model P-40s until 1944, achieving a high kill-to-loss ratio. In the Battle of the Salween River Gorge of May 1942 the AVG used the P-40E model equipped with wing racks that could carry six 35-pound fragmentation bombs and Chennault's armorer developed belly racks to carry Russian 570-pound bombs, which the Chinese had in large quantity.

Units arriving in the CBI after the AVG in the 10th and 14th Air Forces continued to perform well with the P-40, claiming 973 kills in the theater, or 64.8 percent of all enemy aircraft shot down. Aviation historian Carl Molesworth stated that "...the P-40 simply dominated the skies over Burma and China. They were able to establish air superiority over free China, northern Burma and the Assam valley of India in 1942, and they never relinquished it." The 3rd, 5th, 23rd, 51st and 80th FGs, along with the 10th TRS, operated the P-40 in the CBI. (Note: Although part of the US 14th AF, the P-40s of 3rd and 5th FGs of the Chinese American Composite Wing were flown by both American and Chinese pilots.) CBI P-40 pilots used the aircraft very effectively as a fighter-bomber. The 80th Fighter Group in particular used its so-called B-40 (P-40s carrying 1,000-pound high-explosive bombs) to destroy bridges and kill bridge repair crews, sometimes demolishing their target with one bomb. At least 40 US pilots reached ace status while flying the P-40 in the CBI.

==== Europe and Mediterranean theaters ====
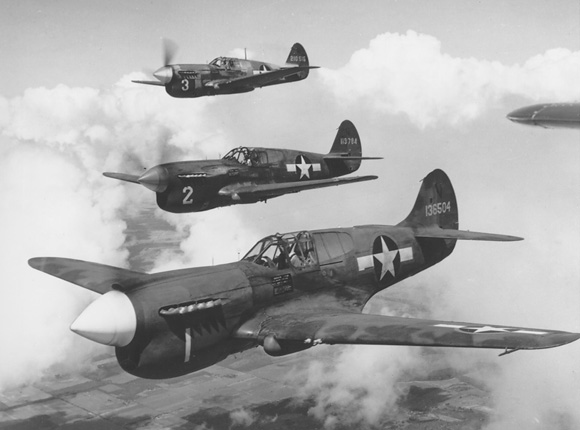
Top to bottom: P-40L, P-40F, and P-40K Warhawk

On 14 August 1942, the first confirmed victory by a USAAF unit over a German aircraft in World War II was initiated by a P-40C pilot. 2nd Lt Joseph D. Shaffer, of the 33rd Fighter Squadron, intercepted a Focke-Wulf Fw 200C-3 maritime patrol aircraft that overflew his base at Reykjavík, Iceland. Shaffer damaged the Fw 200, which was finished off by a P-38F. Warhawks were used extensively in the Mediterranean and Middle East theatre of World War II by USAAF units, including the 33rd, 57th, 58th, 79th, 324th and 325th Fighter Groups. While the P-40 suffered heavy losses in the Mediterranean Theater of Operations (MTO), many USAAF P-40 units achieved high kill-to-loss ratios against Axis aircraft; the 324th FG scored better than a 2:1 ratio in the MTO. In all, 23 US pilots became aces in the MTO on the P-40, most of them during the first half of 1943.

P-40 pilots from the 57th FG were the first USAAF fliers to see action in the MTO, while attached to Desert Air Force Kittyhawk squadrons, from July 1942. The 57th was also the main unit involved in the "Palm Sunday Massacre", on 18 April 1943. Decoded Ultra signals revealed a plan for a large formation of Junkers Ju 52 transports to cross the Mediterranean, escorted by German and Italian fighters. Between 1630 and 1830 hours, all wings of the group were engaged in an intensive effort against the enemy air transports. Of the four Kittyhawk wings, three had left the patrol area before a convoy of a 100+ enemy transports were sighted by 57th FG, which tallied 74 aircraft destroyed. The group was last in the area, and intercepted the Ju 52s escorted by large numbers of Bf 109s, Bf 110s and Macchi C.202s. The group claimed 58 Ju 52s, 14 Bf 109s and two Bf 110s destroyed, with several probables and damaged. Between 20 and 40 of the Axis aircraft landed on the beaches around Cap Bon to avoid being shot down; six Allied fighters were lost, five of them P-40s.

On 22 April, in Operation Flax, a similar force of P-40s attacked a formation of 14 Messerschmitt Me 323 Gigant ("Giant") six-engine transports, covered by seven Bf 109s from II./JG 27. All the transports were shot down, for a loss of three P-40s. The 57th FG was equipped with the Curtiss fighter until early 1944, during which time they were credited with at least 140 air-to-air kills. On 23 February 1943, during Operation Torch, the pilots of the 58th FG flew 75 P-40Ls off the aircraft carrier USS Ranger to the newly captured Vichy French airfield, Cazas, near Casablanca, in French Morocco. The aircraft supplied the 33rd FG and the pilots were reassigned.

The 325th FG (known as the "Checkertail Clan") flew P-40s in the MTO and was credited with at least 133 air-to-air kills from April–October 1943, of which 95 were Bf 109s and 26 were Macchi C.202s, for the loss of 17 P-40s in combat. The 325th FG historian Carol Cathcart wrote:

on 30 July, 20 P-40s of the 317th [Fighter Squadron] ... took off on a fighter sweep ... over Sardinia. As they turned to fly south over the west part of the island, they were attacked near Sassari... The attacking force consisted of 25 to 30 Bf 109s and Macchi C.202s... In the brief, intense battle that occurred ... [the 317th claimed] 21 enemy aircraft.

— Cathcart

Cathcart wrote that Lt. Robert Sederberg assisted a comrade being attacked by five Bf 109s, destroyed at least one German aircraft, and may have shot down as many as five. Sederberg was shot down and became a prisoner of war.

A famous African-American unit, the 99th FS, better known as the "Tuskegee Airmen" or "Redtails", flew P-40s in stateside training and for their initial eight months in the MTO. On 9 June 1943, they became the first African-American fighter pilots to engage enemy aircraft, over Pantelleria, Italy. A single Focke-Wulf Fw 190 was reported damaged by Lieutenant Willie Ashley Jr. On 2 July the squadron claimed its first verified kill; a Fw 190 destroyed by Captain Charles Hall. The 99th continued to score with P-40s until February 1944, when they were assigned P-39s and P-51 Mustangs.

The much-lightened P-40L was most heavily used in the MTO, primarily by US pilots. Many US pilots stripped down their P-40s even further to improve performance, often removing two or more of the wing guns to improve the roll rate.

=== Royal Australian Air Force ===
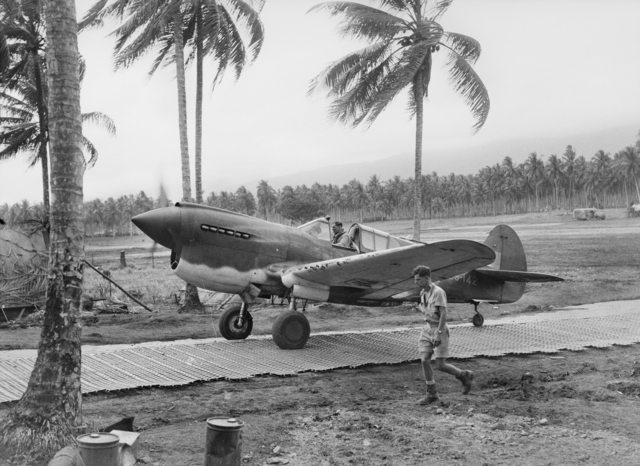
P-40E-1 piloted by the ace Keith "Bluey" Truscott, commander of No. 76 Squadron RAAF, taxis along Marston Matting at Milne Bay, New Guinea in September 1942

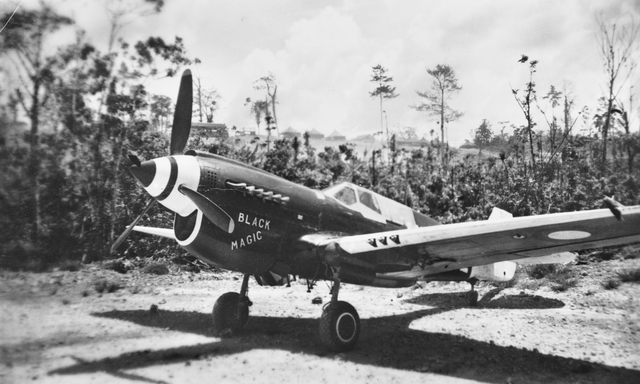
P-40N-15 "Black Magic", No. 78 Squadron RAAF F/L Denis Baker scored the RAAF's last aerial victory over New Guinea in this fighter on 10 June 1944. It was later flown by W/O Len Waters. Note the dark blue tip on the tailfin used to identify 78 Squadron.

The Kittyhawk was the main fighter used by the RAAF in World War II, in greater numbers than the Spitfire. Two RAAF squadrons serving with the Desert Air Force, No. 3 and No. 450 Squadrons, were the first Australian units to be assigned P-40s. Other RAAF pilots served with RAF or SAAF P-40 squadrons in the theater.

Many RAAF pilots achieved high scores in the P-40. At least five reached "double ace" status: Clive Caldwell, Nicky Barr, John Waddy, Bob Whittle (11 kills each) and Bobby Gibbes (10 kills) in the Middle East, North African and/or New Guinea campaigns. In all, 18 RAAF pilots became aces while flying P-40s.

Nicky Barr, like many Australian pilots, considered the P-40 a reliable mount: "The Kittyhawk became, to me, a friend. It was quite capable of getting you out of trouble more often than not. It was a real warhorse."

At the same time as the heaviest fighting in North Africa, the Pacific War was also in its early stages, and RAAF units in Australia were completely lacking in suitable fighter aircraft. Spitfire production was being absorbed by the war in Europe; P-38s were trialled, but were difficult to obtain; Mustangs had not yet reached squadrons anywhere, and Australia's tiny and inexperienced aircraft industry was geared towards larger aircraft. USAAF P-40s and their pilots originally intended for the US Far East Air Force in the Philippines, but diverted to Australia as a result of Japanese naval activity were the first suitable fighter aircraft to arrive in substantial numbers. By mid-1942, the RAAF was able to obtain some USAAF replacement shipments.

RAAF Kittyhawks played a crucial role in the South West Pacific theater. They fought on the front line as fighters during the critical early years of the Pacific War, and the durability and bomb-carrying abilities (1,000 lb/454 kg) of the P-40 also made it ideal for the ground attack role. During the Battle of Port Moresby RAAF 75 destroyed or damaged some 33 Japanese aircraft of various types, with another 30 probables. General Henry H. Arnold said of No 75 squadron: "Victory in the entire air war against Japan can be traced back to the actions which took place from that dusty strip at Port Moresby in early 1942." For example, 75, and 76 Squadrons played a critical role during the Battle of Milne Bay, fending off Japanese aircraft and providing effective close air support for the Australian infantry, negating the initial Japanese advantage in light tanks and sea power. The Kittyhawks fired "nearly 200,000 rounds of half-inch ammunition" during the course of the battle.

The RAAF units that most used Kittyhawks in the South West Pacific were 75, 76, 77, 78, 80, 82, 84 and 86 Squadrons. These squadrons saw action mostly in the New Guinea and Borneo campaigns.

Late in 1945, RAAF fighter squadrons in the South West Pacific began converting to P-51Ds. However, Kittyhawks were in use with the RAAF until the end of the war, in Borneo. In all, the RAAF acquired 841 Kittyhawks (not counting the British-ordered examples used in North Africa), including 163 P-40E, 42 P-40K, 90 P-40 M and 553 P-40N models. In addition, the RAAF ordered 67 Kittyhawks for use by No. 120 (Netherlands East Indies) Squadron (a joint Australian-Dutch unit in the South West Pacific). The P-40 was retired by the RAAF in 1947.

=== Royal Canadian Air Force ===
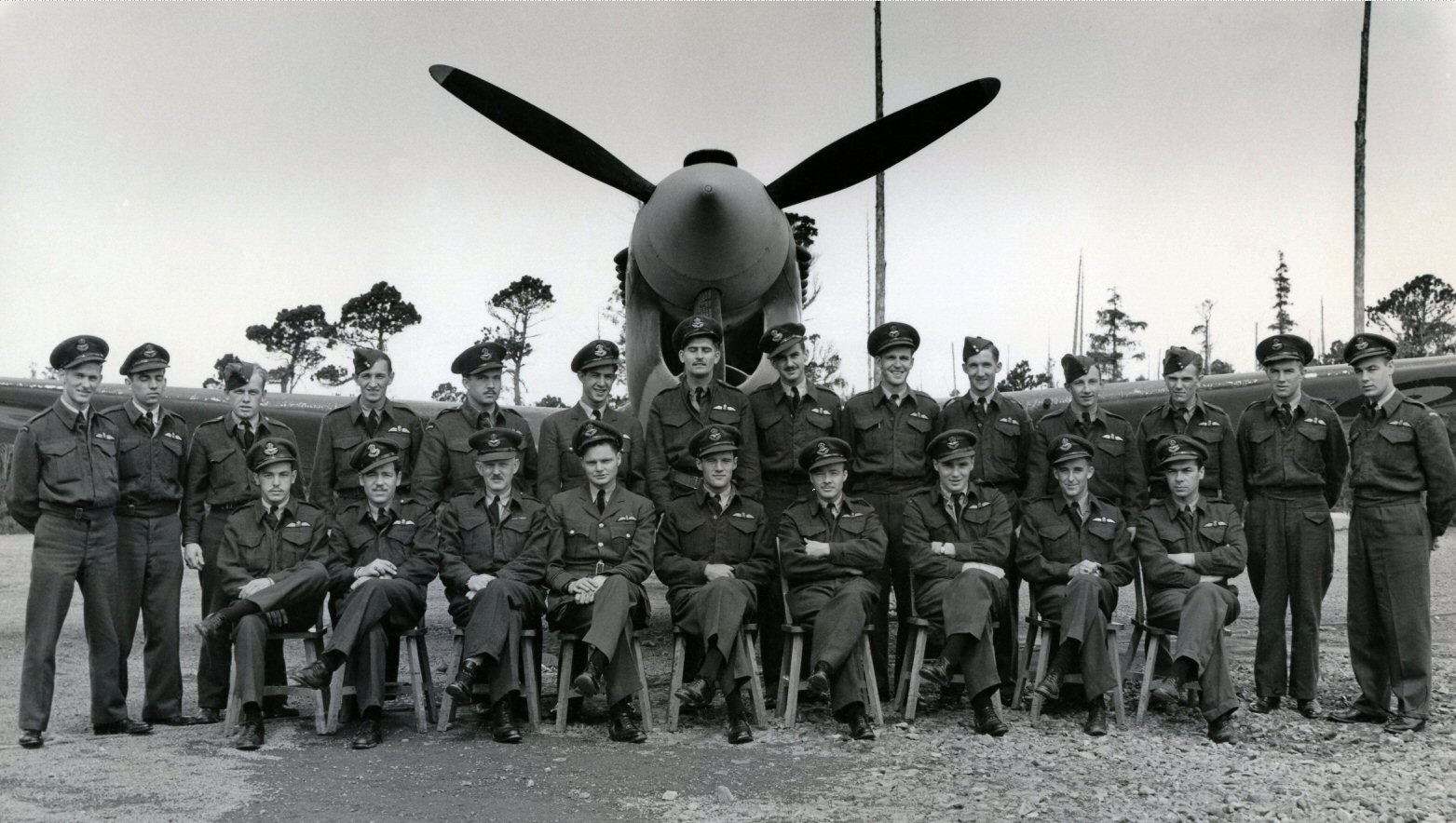
118 Sqn RCAF Kittyhawk pilots take a group picture on Sea Island in 1943.

A total of 13 Royal Canadian Air Force units operated the P-40 in the North West European or Alaskan theaters.

In mid-May 1940, Canadian and US officers watched comparative tests of a XP-40 and a Spitfire, at RCAF Uplands, Ottawa. While the Spitfire was considered to have performed better, it was not available for use in Canada and the P-40 was ordered to meet home air defense requirements. In all, eight Home War Establishment Squadrons were equipped with the Kittyhawk: 72 Kittyhawk I, 12 Kittyhawk Ia, 15 Kittyhawk III and 35 Kittyhawk IV aircraft, for a total of 134 aircraft. These aircraft were mostly diverted from RAF Lend-Lease orders for service in Canada. The P-40 Kittyhawks were obtained in lieu of 144 P-39 Airacobras originally allocated to Canada but reassigned to the RAF.

However, before any home units received the P-40, three RCAF Article XV squadrons operated Tomahawk aircraft from bases in the United Kingdom. No. 403 Squadron RCAF, a fighter unit, used the Tomahawk Mk II briefly before converting to Spitfires. Two Army Co-operation (close air support) squadrons: 400 and 414 Sqns trained with Tomahawks, before converting to Mustang Mk. I aircraft and a fighter/reconnaissance role. Of these, only No. 400 Squadron used Tomahawks operationally, conducting a number of armed sweeps over France in the late 1941. RCAF pilots also flew Tomahawks or Kittyhawks with other British Commonwealth units based in North Africa, the Mediterranean, South East Asia and (in at least one case) the South West Pacific. (Note: After being evacuated from Singapore to Australia in 1942, F/L Thomas W. Watson RCAF served for a period with No. 77 Squadron RAAF.)

In 1942, the Imperial Japanese Navy occupied two islands, Attu and Kiska, in the Aleutians, off Alaska. RCAF home defense P-40 squadrons saw combat over the Aleutians, assisting the USAAF. The RCAF initially sent 111 Squadron, flying the Kittyhawk I, to the US base on Adak island. During the drawn-out campaign, 12 Canadian Kittyhawks operated on a rotational basis from a new, more advanced base on Amchitka,75 mi (121 km) southeast of Kiska. 14 and 111 Sqns took "turn-about" at the base. During a major attack on Japanese positions at Kiska on 25 September 1942, Squadron Leader Ken Boomer shot down a Nakajima A6M2-N ("Rufe") seaplane. The RCAF also purchased 12 P-40Ks directly from the USAAF while in the Aleutians. After the Japanese threat diminished, these two RCAF squadrons returned to Canada and eventually transferred to England without their Kittyhawks.

In January 1943, a further Article XV unit, 430 Squadron was formed at RAF Hartford Bridge, England and trained on obsolete Tomahawk IIA. The squadron converted to the Mustang I before commencing operations in mid-1943.

In early 1945 pilots from No. 133 Squadron RCAF, operating the P-40N out of RCAF Patricia Bay, (Victoria, British Columbia), intercepted and destroyed two Japanese balloon-bombs, which were designed to cause wildfires on the North American mainland. On 21 February, Pilot Officer E. E. Maxwell shot down a balloon, which landed on Sumas Mountain in Washington State. On 10 March, Pilot Officer J. 0. Patten destroyed a balloon near Saltspring Island, British Columbia. The last interception took place on 20 April 1945 when Pilot Officer P.V. Brodeur from 135 Squadron out of Abbotsford, British Columbia shot down a balloon over Vedder Mountain.

The RCAF units that operated P-40s were, in order of conversion:

- Article XV squadrons serving in the UK under direct command and control of the RAF, with RAF owned aircraft.
  - 403 Squadron (Tomahawk IIA and IIB, March 1941)
  - 400 Squadron (Tomahawk I, IIA and IIB, April 1941 – September 1942)
  - 414 Squadron (Tomahawk I, IIA and IIB, August 1941 – September 1942)
  - 430 Squadron (Tomahawk IIA and IIB, January 1943 – February 1943)
- Operational Squadrons of the Home War Establishment (HWE) (Based in Canada)
  - 111 Squadron (Kittyhawk I, IV, November 1941 – December 1943 and P-40K, September 1942 – July 1943),
  - 118 Squadron (Kittyhawk I, November 1941 – October 1943),
  - 14 Squadron (Kittyhawk I, January 1942 – September 1943),
  - 132 Squadron (Kittyhawk IA & III, April 1942 – September 1944),
  - 130 Squadron (Kittyhawk I, May 1942 – October 1942),
  - 163 Squadron (Kittyhawk I & III, October 1943 – March 1944),
  - 133 Squadron (Kittyhawk I, March 1944 – July 1945) and
  - 135 Squadron (Kittyhawk IV, May 1944 – September 1945).

=== Royal New Zealand Air Force ===
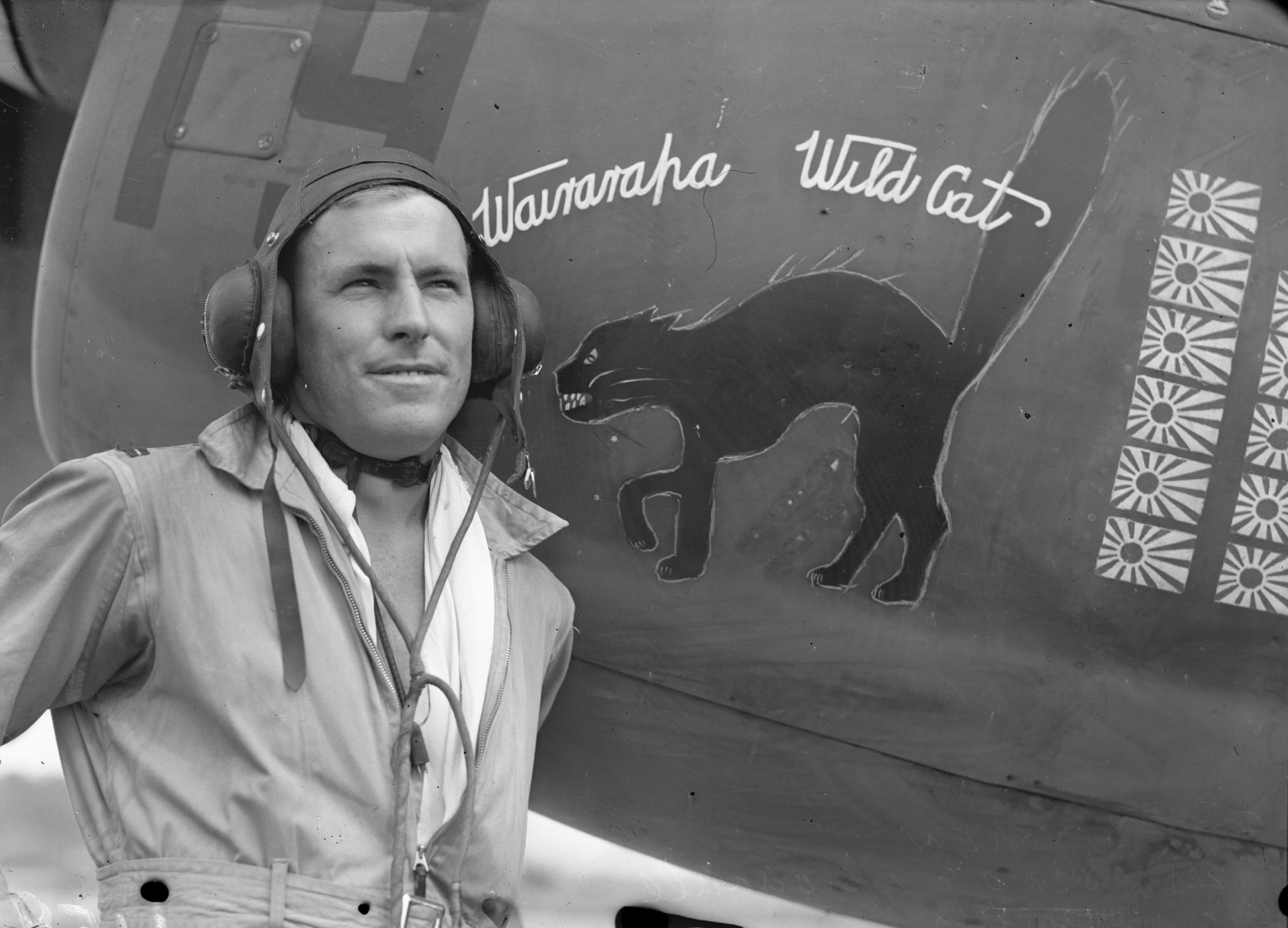
F/O Geoff Fisken in front of his P-40, Wairarapa Wildcat (NZ3072/19)

Some Royal New Zealand Air Force (RNZAF) pilots and New Zealanders in other air forces flew British P-40s while serving with DAF squadrons in North Africa and Italy, including the ace Jerry Westenra.

A total of 301 P-40s were allocated to the RNZAF under Lend-Lease, for use in the Pacific Theater, although four of these were lost in transit. The aircraft equipped 14 Squadron, 15 Squadron, 16 Squadron, 17 Squadron, 18 Squadron, 19 Squadron and 20 Squadron.

RNZAF P-40 squadrons were successful in air combat against the Japanese between 1942 and 1944. Their pilots claimed 100 aerial victories in P-40s, whilst losing 20 aircraft in combat (Note: In total, the RNZAF claimed 106 victories in the Pacific: three by 488(NZ) Sqn in Singapore and Malaya (all confirmed), three by Lockheed Hudsons (one confirmed) and the remaining 102 by P-40 pilots. A total of 99 victories were officially confirmed, including 95 by P-40s.) Geoff Fisken, the highest scoring British Commonwealth ace in the Pacific, flew P-40s with 15 Squadron, although half of his victories were claimed with the Brewster Buffalo.

The overwhelming majority of RNZAF P-40 victories were scored against Japanese fighters, mostly Zeroes. Other victories included Aichi D3A "Val" dive bombers. The only confirmed twin engine claim, a Ki-21 "Sally" (misidentified as a G4M "Betty") fell to Fisken in July 1943.

From late 1943 and 1944, RNZAF P-40s were increasingly used against ground targets, including the innovative use of naval depth charges as improvised high-capacity bombs. The last front line RNZAF P-40s were replaced by Vought F4U Corsairs in 1944. The P-40s were relegated to use as advanced pilot trainers.

The remaining RNZAF P-40s, excluding the 20 shot down and 154 written off, were mostly scrapped at Rukuhia in 1948.

=== Soviet Union ===
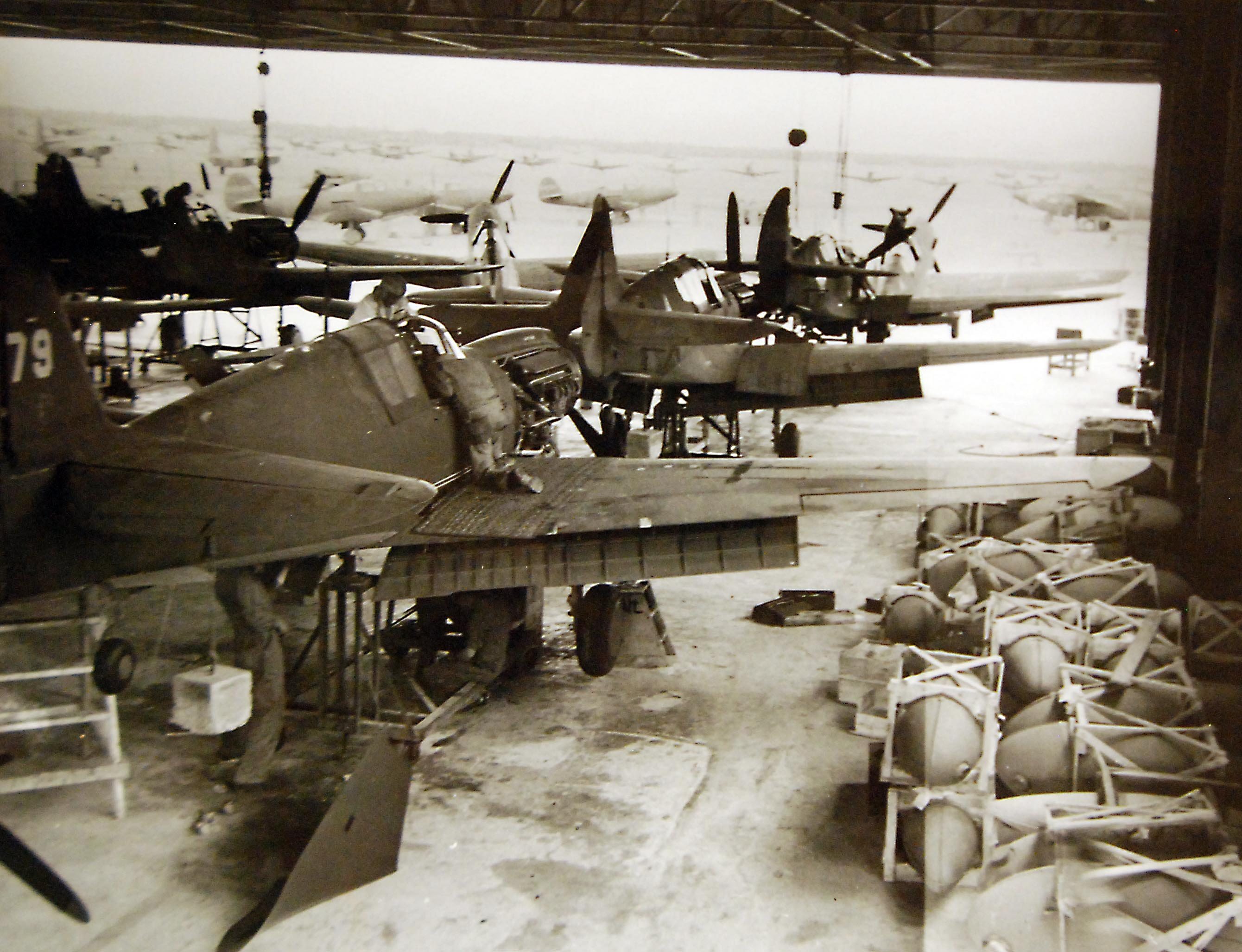
Assembly of P-40s for Soviet Union, somewhere in Iran, 1943

The Soviet Air Forces and Soviet Naval Aviation also referred to P-40s as "Tomahawks" and "Kittyhawks". In fact, the Curtiss P-40 Tomahawk / Kittyhawk was the first Allied fighter supplied to the USSR under the Lend-Lease agreement. The USSR received 247 P-40B/Cs (equivalent to the Tomahawk IIA/B in RAF service) and 2,178 P-40E, -K, -L, and -N models between 1941 and 1944. The Tomahawks were shipped from Great Britain and directly from the US, many of them arriving incomplete, lacking machine guns and even the lower half of the engine cowling. In late September 1941, the first 48 P-40s were assembled and checked in the USSR. Test flights showed some manufacturing defects: generator and oil pump gears and generator shafts failed repeatedly, which led to emergency landings. The test report indicated that the Tomahawk was inferior to Soviet "M-105P-powered production fighters in speed and rate of climb. However, it had good short field performance, horizontal maneuverability, range, and endurance." Nevertheless, Tomahawks and Kittyhawks were used against the Germans. The 126th Fighter Aviation Regiment (IAP), fighting on the Western and Kalinin Fronts, were the first unit to receive the P-40. The regiment entered action on 12 October 1941. By 15 November 1941, the regiment had shot down 17 German aircraft. However, Lt (SG) Smirnov noted that the P-40 armament was sufficient for strafing enemy lines but rather ineffective in aerial combat. Another pilot, Stephan Ridny (a Hero of the Soviet Union), remarked that he had to shoot half the ammunition at 50–100 meters (165–340 ft) to shoot down an enemy aircraft.

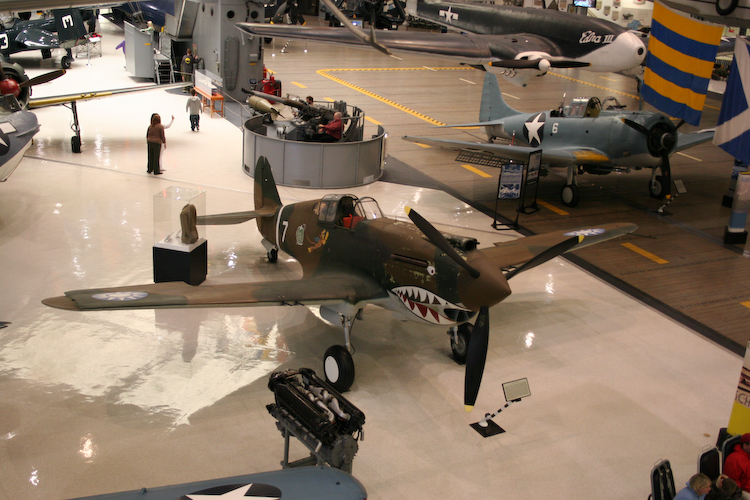
Hawk 81A-3/Tomahawk IIb AK255, at the US National Museum of Naval Aviation, is shown in the colors of the Flying Tigers, but never served with them; it began life with the RAF and was later transferred to the Soviet Union

In January 1942, some 198 aircraft sorties were flown (334 flying hours) and 11 aerial engagements were conducted, in which five Bf 109s, one Ju 88, and one He 111 were downed. On 18 January 1942, Lieutenants S. V. Levin and I. P. Levsha (in pair) fought an engagement with seven Bf 109s and shot down two of them without loss. On 22 January, a flight of three aircraft led by Lieutenant E. E. Lozov engaged 13 enemy aircraft and shot down two Bf 109Es, again without loss. Altogether, in January, two Tomahawks were lost; one downed by German anti-aircraft artillery and one lost to Messerschmitts.

The Soviets stripped down their P-40s significantly for combat, in many cases removing the wing guns altogether in P-40B/C types, for example. Soviet Air Force reports state that they liked the range and fuel capacity of the P-40, which were superior to most of the Soviet fighters, though they still preferred the P-39. Soviet pilot Nikolai G. Golodnikov recalled: "The cockpit was vast and high. At first it felt unpleasant to sit waist-high in glass, as the edge of the fuselage was almost at waist level. But the bullet-proof glass and armored seat were strong and visibility was good. The radio was also good. It was powerful, reliable, but only on HF (high frequency). The American radios did not have hand microphones but throat microphones. These were good throat mikes: small, light and comfortable." The biggest complaint of some Soviet airmen was its poor climb rate and problems with maintenance, especially with burning out the engines. VVS pilots usually flew the P-40 at War Emergency Power settings while in combat, which brought acceleration and speed performance closer to that of their German rivals, but could burn out engines in a matter of weeks. Tires and batteries also failed. The fluid in the engine's radiators often froze, cracking their cores, which made the Allison engine unsuitable for operations during harsh winter conditions. During the winter of 1941, the 126th Fighter Aviation Regiment suffered from cracked radiators on 38 occasions. Often, entire regiments were reduced to a single flyable aircraft because no replacement parts were available. They also had difficulty with the more demanding requirements for fuel and oil quality of the Allison engines. A fair number of burned-out P-40s were re-engined with Soviet Klimov M-105 engines, but these performed relatively poorly and were relegated to rear area use.

Actually, the P-40 could engage all Messerschmitts on equal terms, almost to the end of 1943. If you take into consideration all the characteristics of the P-40, then the Tomahawk was equal to the Bf 109F and the Kittyhawk was slightly better. Its speed and vertical and horizontal manoeuvre were good and fully competitive with enemy aircraft. Acceleration rate was a bit low, but when you got used to the engine, it was OK. We considered the P-40 a decent fighter plane.

— N. G. Golodnikov,
2nd Guards Fighter Regiment (GIAP),
Northern Aviation Fleet (VVS SF)

The P-40 saw the most front line use in Soviet hands in 1942 and early 1943. Deliveries over the Alaska-Siberia ALSIB ferry route began in October 1942. It was used in the northern sectors and played a significant role in the defense of Leningrad. The most numerically important types were P-40B/C, P-40E and P-40K/M. By the time the better P-40F and N types became available, production of superior Soviet fighters had increased sufficiently so that the P-40 was replaced in most Soviet Air Force units by the Lavochkin La-5 and various later Yakovlev types. In early 1943, Lt D.I. Koval of the 45th IAP gained ace status on the North Caucasian front, shooting down six German aircraft flying a P-40. Some Soviet P-40 squadrons had good combat records. Some Soviet pilots became aces on the P-40, though not as many as on the P-39 Airacobra, the most numerous Lend-Lease fighter used by the Soviet Union. However, Soviet commanders thought the Kittyhawk significantly outclassed the Hurricane, although it was "not in the same league as the Yak-1".

=== Japan ===
The Japanese Army captured some P-40s and later operated a number in Burma. The Japanese appear to have had as many as 10 flyable P-40Es. For a brief period in 1943, a few of them were used operationally by 2 Hiko Chutai, 50 Hiko Sentai (2nd Air Squadron, 50th Air Regiment) in the defense of Rangoon. Testimony of this is given by Yasuhiko Kuroe, a member of the 64 Hiko Sentai. In his memoirs, he says one Japanese-operated P-40 was shot down in error by a friendly Mitsubishi Ki-21 "Sally" over Rangoon.

=== Other nations ===
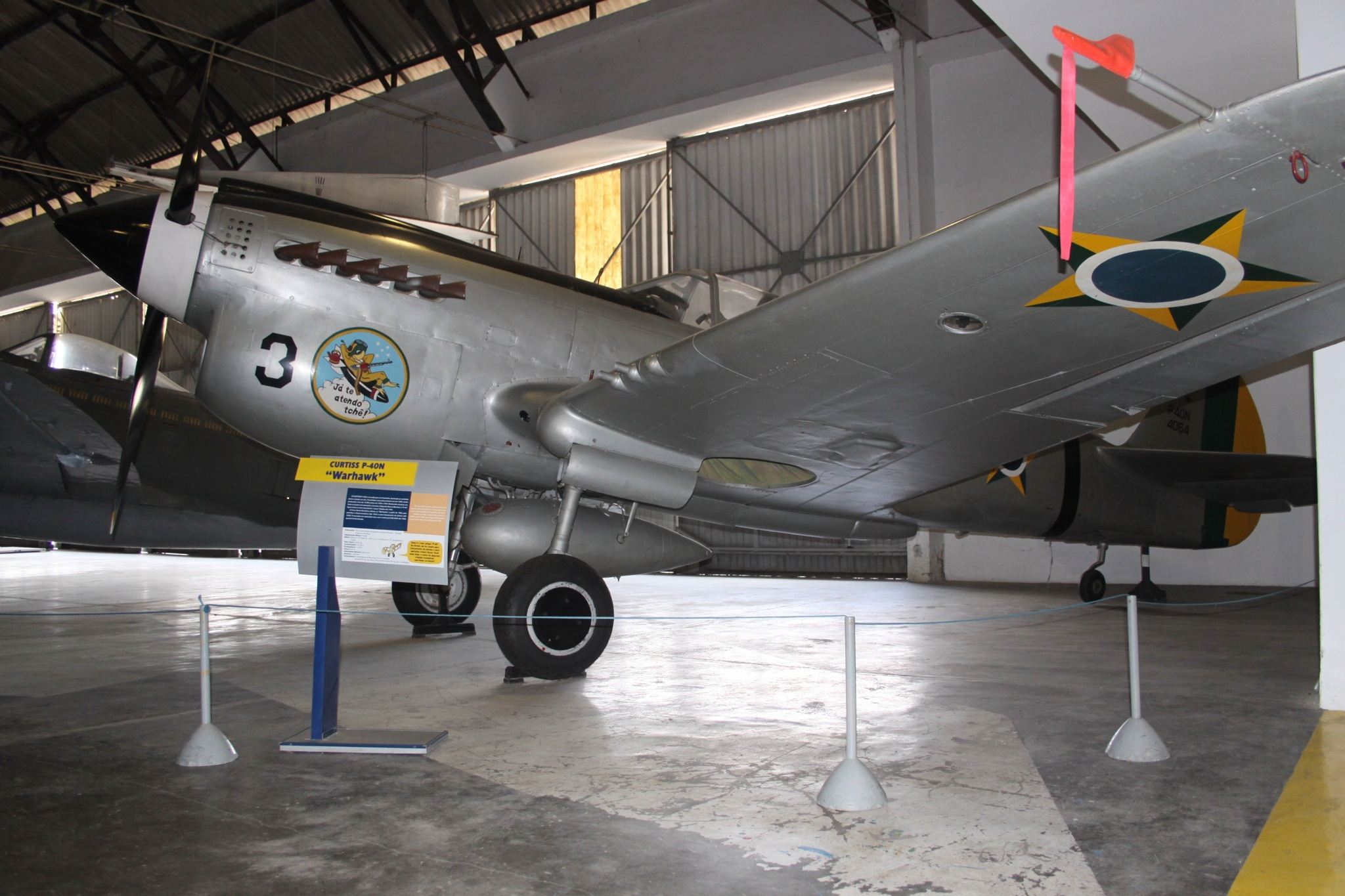
P-40 Warhawk at Campo Dos Afonsos

The P-40 was used by over two dozen countries during and after the war. The P-40 was used by Brazil, Egypt, Finland and Turkey. The last P-40s in military service, used by the Brazilian Air Force (FAB), were retired in 1954.

In the air war over Finland, several Soviet P-40s were shot down or had to crash-land due to other reasons. The Finns, short of good aircraft, collected these and managed to repair one P-40M, P-40M-10-CU 43–5925, white 23, which received Finnish Air Force serial number KH-51 (KH denoting "Kittyhawk", as the British designation of this type was Kittyhawk III). This aircraft was attached to an operational squadron HLeLv 32 of the Finnish Air Force, but lack of spares kept it on the ground, with the exception of a few evaluation flights.

Several P-40Ns were used by the Royal Netherlands East Indies Army Air Force with No. 120 (Netherlands East Indies) Squadron RAAF against the Japanese before being used during the fighting in Indonesia until February 1949.

== Variants and development stages ==
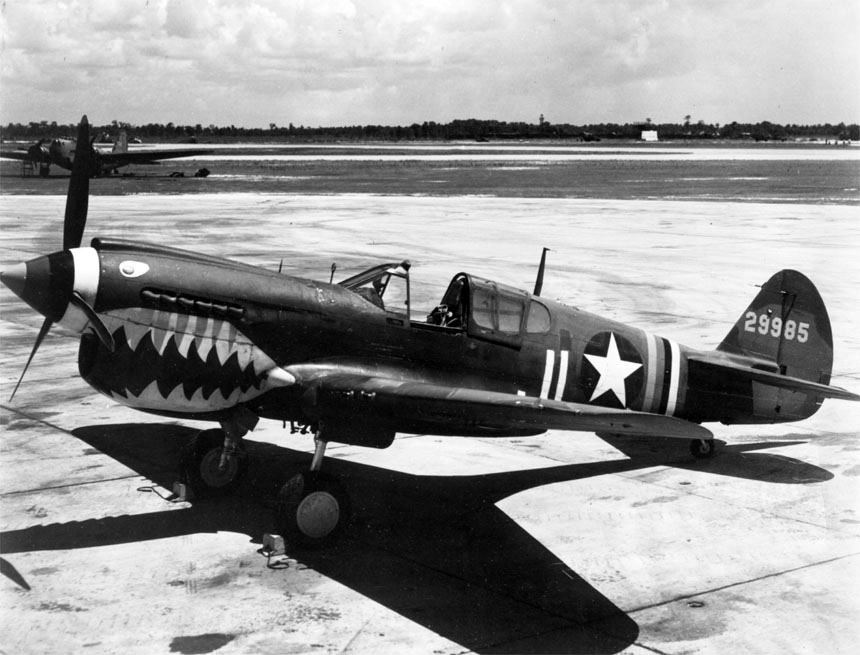
A USAAF Curtiss P-40K-10-CU, serial number 42-9985, c. 1943

XP-40
The original Curtiss XP-40, ordered July 1937, was converted from the 10th P-36A by replacing the radial engine with a new Allison V-1710-19 engine. It flew for the first time in October 1938.

This new liquid-cooled engine fighter had a radiator mounted under the rear fuselage but the prototype XP-40 was later modified and the radiator was moved forward under the engine.

P-40
The P-40 (Curtiss Model 81A-1) was the first production variant, 199 built.
P-40A
One P-40 was modified with a camera installation in the rear fuselage and re-designated P-40A.

- Revised versions of the P-40 soon followed: the P-40B or Tomahawk IIA had extra.30 in (7.62 mm) US, or .303 in (7.7 mm) machine guns in the wings and a partially protected fuel system; the P-40C or Tomahawk IIB added underbelly drop tank and bomb shackles, self-sealing fuel tanks and other minor revisions, but the extra weight did have a negative impact on aircraft performance. (All versions of the P-40 had a relatively low power-to-weight ratio compared to contemporary fighters.)
- Only a small number of P-40D or Kittyhawk Mk Is were made, fewer than 50. With a new, larger Allison engine, slightly narrower fuselage, redesigned canopy, and improved cockpit, the P-40D eliminated the nose-mounted.50 in (12.7 mm) guns and instead had a pair of.50 in (12.7 mm) guns in each wing. The distinctive chin airscoop grew larger so it could adequately cool the large Allison engine.
- Retrospective designation for a single prototype. The P-40A was a single camera-carrying aircraft.
- The P-40E or P-40E-1 was similar in most respects to the P-40D, except for a slightly more powerful engine and an extra.50 in (12.7 mm) gun in each wing, bringing the total to six. Some aircraft also had small underwing bomb shackles. Supplied to the Commonwealth air forces as the Kittyhawk Mk IA. The P-40E was the variant that bore the brunt of air-to-air combat by the type in the key period of early to mid 1942, for example with the first US squadrons to replace the AVG in China (the AVG was already transitioning to this type from the P-40B/C), the type used by the Australians at Milne Bay, by the New Zealand squadrons during most of their air-to-air combat, and by the RAF/Commonwealth in North Africa as the Kittyhawk IA.

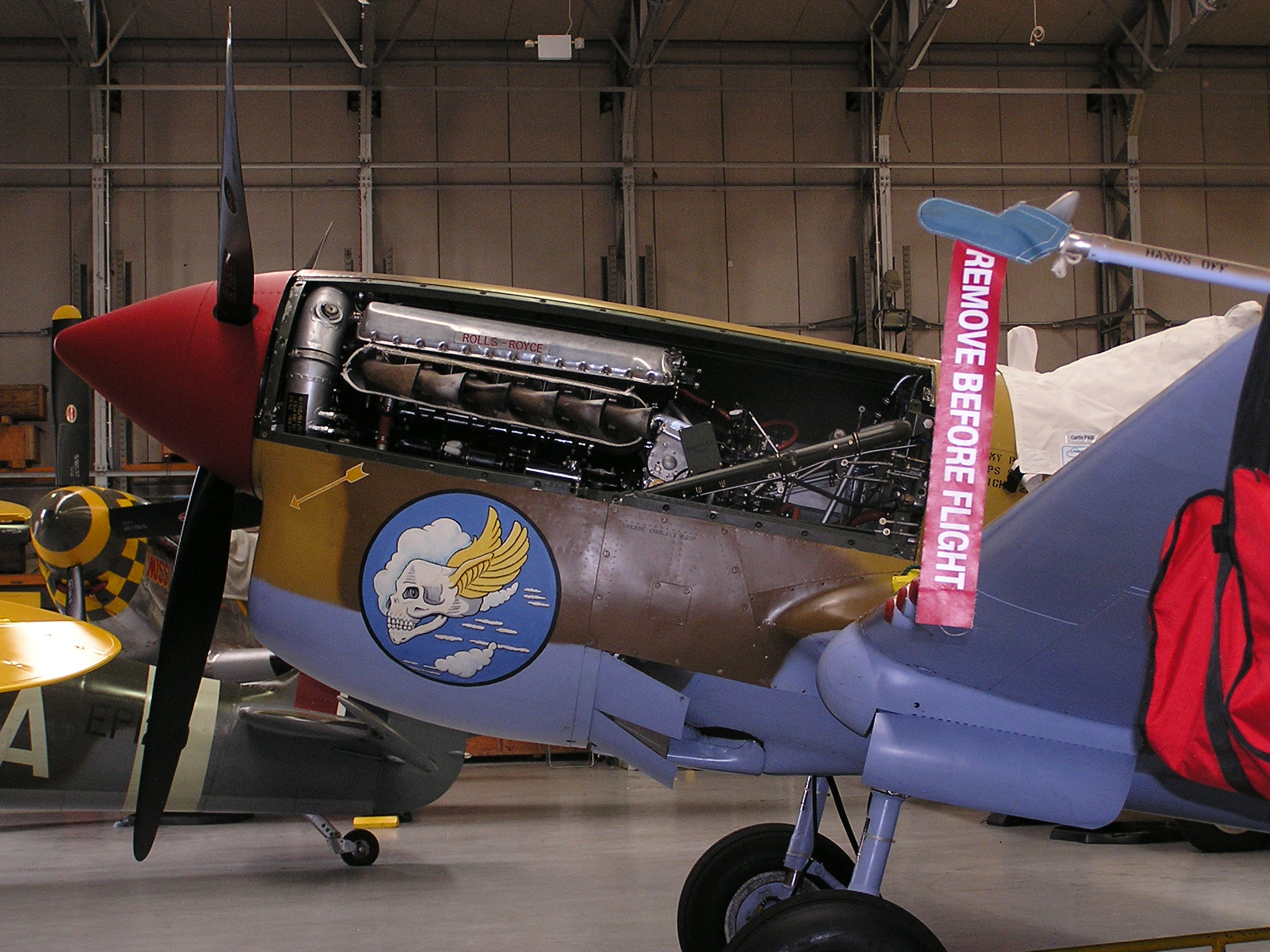
The Fighter Collection's P-40F G-CGZP, showing Merlin 500 engine

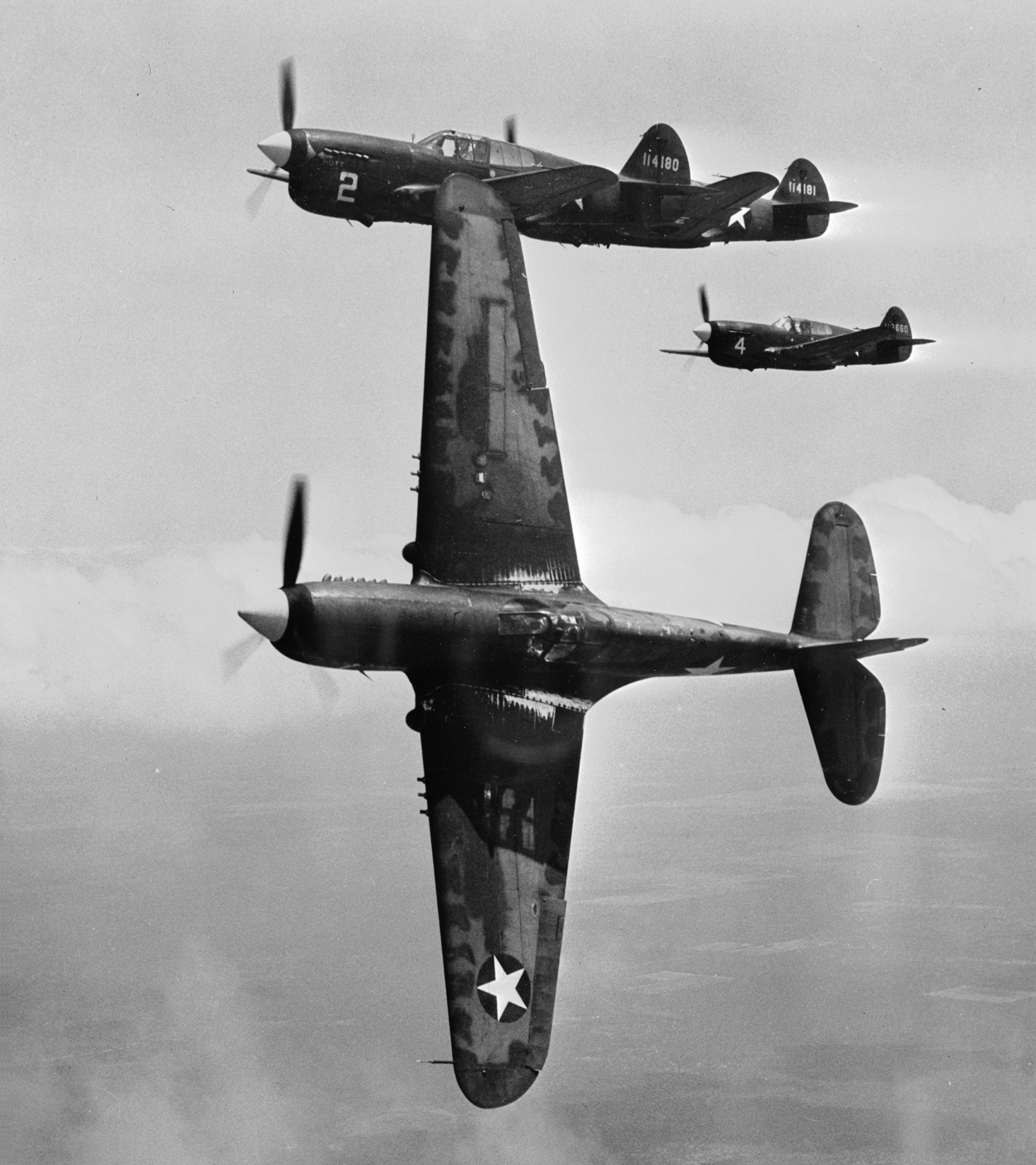
In the vicinity of Moore Field, Texas. The lead ship in a formation of P-40s is peeling off for the "attack" in a practice flight at the US Army Air Forces advanced flying school. Selected aviation cadets were given transition training in these fighters before receiving their pilot's wings, 1943.

- P-40F and P-40L, which both featured Packard V-1650 Merlin engine in place of the normal Allison, and thus did not have the carburetor scoop on top of the nose. Performance for these models at higher altitudes was better than their Allison-engined cousins. The L in some cases also featured a fillet in front of the vertical stabilizer, or a stretched fuselage to compensate for the higher torque. The P-40L was sometimes nicknamed "Gypsy Rose Lee", after a famous stripper of the era, due to its stripped-down condition. Supplied to the Commonwealth air forces under the designation Kittyhawk Mk II, a total of 330 Mk IIs were supplied to the RAF under Lend-Lease. The first 230 aircraft are sometimes known as the Kittyhawk Mk IIA. The P-40F/L was extensively used by US fighter groups operating in the Mediterranean Theater.
- P-40G: 43 P-40 aircraft fitted with the wings of the Tomahawk Mk IIA. A total of 16 aircraft were supplied to the Soviet Union, and the rest to the US Army Air Forces. It was later redesignated RP-40G.
- P-40K, an Allison-engined P-40L, with the nose-top scoop retained and the Allison-configured nose radiators scoop, cowl flaps and vertical-stabilizer-to-fuselage fillet. Supplied to the Commonwealth air forces as the Kittyhawk Mk III, it was widely used by US units in the CBI.
- P-40M, version generally similar to the P-40K, with a stretched fuselage like the P-40L and powered by an Allison V-1710-81 engine giving better performance at altitude (compared to previous Allison versions). It had some detail improvements and it was characterized by two small air scoops just before the exhaust pipes. Most of them were supplied to Allied countries (mainly UK and USSR), while some others remained in the US for advanced training. It was also supplied to the Commonwealth air forces as the Kittyhawk Mk. III.
- P-40N, the final production model. The P-40N featured a stretched rear fuselage to counter the torque of the more powerful, late-war Allison engine, and the rear deck of the cockpit behind the pilot was cut down at a moderate slant to improve rearward visibility. A great deal of work was also done to eliminate excess weight to improve the climb rate. Early N production blocks dropped a.50 in (12.7 mm) gun from each wing, bringing the total back to four; later production blocks reintroduced it after complaints from units in the field. Supplied to Commonwealth air forces as the Kittyhawk Mk IV. A total of 553 P-40Ns were acquired by the Royal Australian Air Force, making it the variant most commonly used by the RAAF. Subvariants of the P-40N ranged widely in specialization from stripped down four-gun "hot rods" that could reach the highest top speeds of any production variant of the P-40 (up to 380 mph), to overweight types with all the extras intended for fighter-bombing or even training missions. The 15,000th P-40 was an N model decorated with the markings of 28 nations that had employed any of Curtiss-Wright's various aircraft products, not just P-40s. "These spectacular markings gave rise to the erroneous belief that the P-40 series had been used by all 28 countries." In Europe, since the P-40N was used mainly as a ground attack aircraft by 1944, it was nicknamed "B-40" by some pilots. Survivors redesignated as ZF-40N in June 1948.

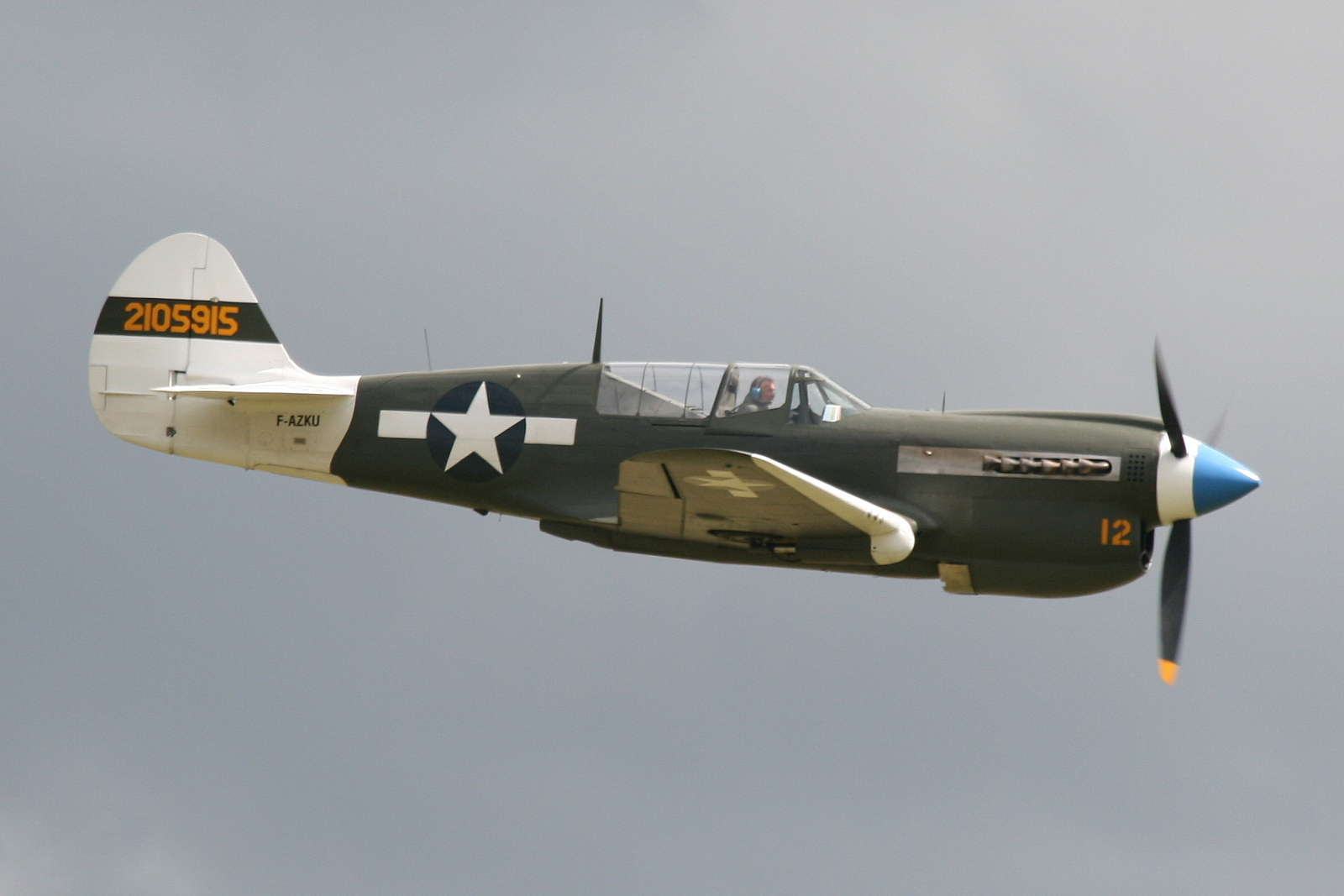
Curtiss P-40N Warhawk "Little Jeanne" in flight

- P-40P: The designation of 1,500 aircraft ordered with V-1650-1 engines, but actually built as the P-40N with V-1710-81 engines.
- XP-40Q: Three P-40N modified with a 4-bladed prop, cut-down rear fuselage and bubble canopy, four guns, squared-off wingtips and tail surfaces, and improved engine with two-speed supercharger. Even with these changes, its performance was not enough of an improvement to merit production when compared to the contemporary late model P-47Ds and P-51Ds pouring off production lines. The XP-40Q was, however, the fastest of the P-40 series with a top speed of 422 mph (679 km/h) as a result of the introduction of a high-altitude supercharger gear. (No P-40 model with a single-speed supercharger could even approach 400 mph (640 km/h))
- P-40R: The designation of P-40F and P-40L aircraft that had Allison engines retrofitted in the field for standardization and logistics.
- RP-40: Some American P-40s were converted into reconnaissance aircraft.
- TP-40: Some P-40s were converted into two-seat trainers.
- Twin P-40: A single photo exists of a P-40 mocked up with two Merlin engines, mounted atop the wings, over the main landing gear.

== Operators ==
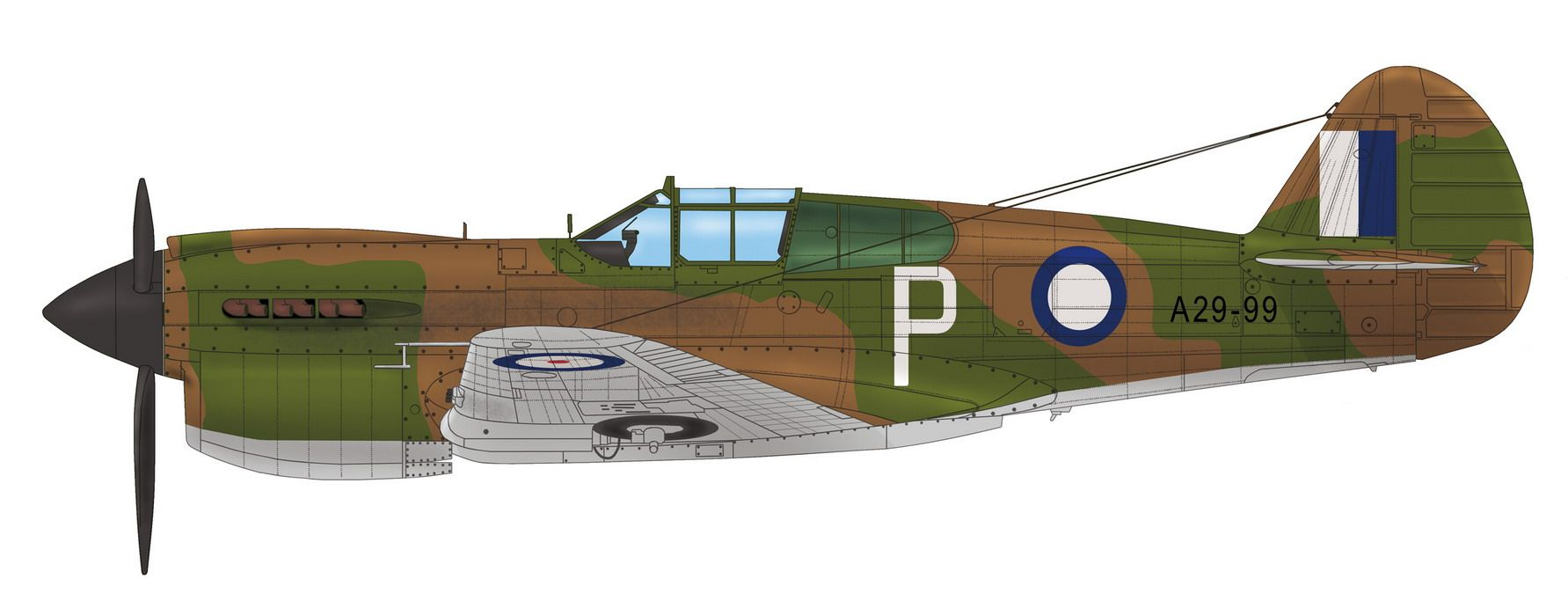
Curtiss Kittyhawk Mk IA of 75 Squadron RAAF, which F/O Geoff Atherton flew over New Guinea in August 1942

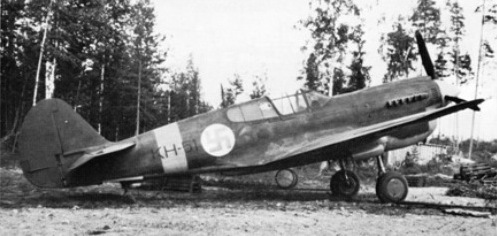
The only Finnish Warhawk in 1944. This aircraft was a former Soviet P-40M (known as Silver 23)

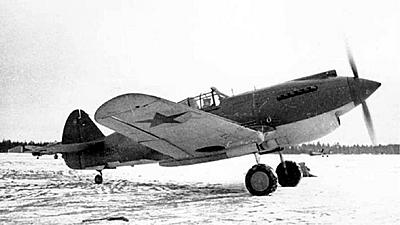
A Soviet P-40B Warhawk in 1942

Australia

- Royal Australian Air Force

Brazil

- Brazilian Air Force

Canada

- Royal Canadian Air Force

China

- Chinese Nationalist Air Force

Egypt

- Royal Egyptian Air Force

Finland

- Finnish Air Force

France

- French Air Force

Japan

- Japanese Army Air Force – Captured P-40s.

Netherlands

- Royal Netherlands East Indies Army Air Force

New Zealand

- Royal New Zealand Air Force

Poland

- Polish Air Force

South Africa

- South African Air Force

Soviet Union

- Soviet Air Force
- Soviet Naval Aviation

Turkey

- Turkish Air Force

United Kingdom

- Royal Air Force

United States

- United States Army Air Corps
- United States Army Air Forces

== Surviving aircraft ==
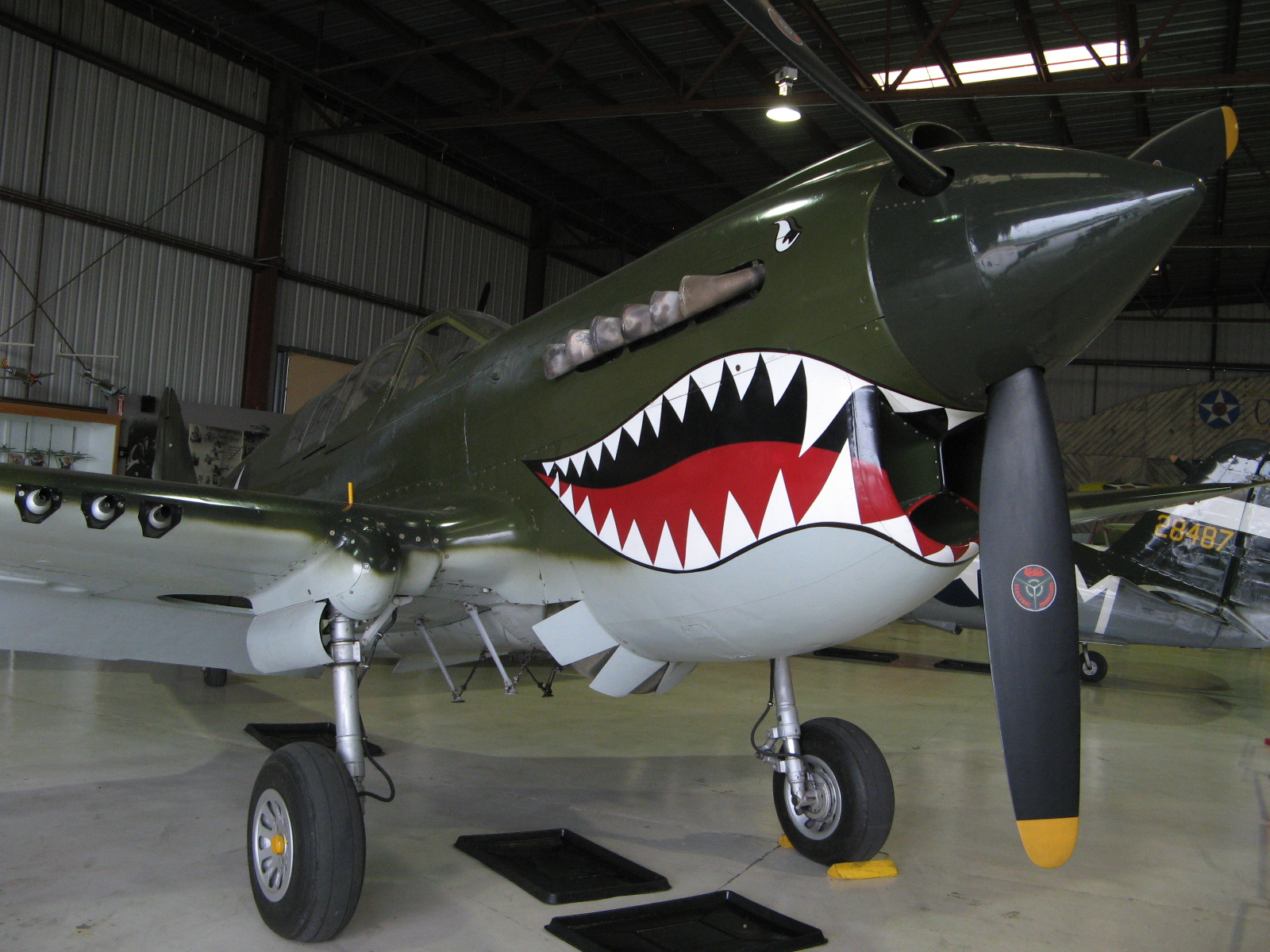
A flyable Curtiss P-40N-5-CU Warhawk at Planes of Fame Air Museum

Of the 13,738 P-40s built, only 28 remain airworthy, with three of them being converted to dual-controls/dual-seat configuration. Approximately 13 aircraft are on static display and another 36 airframes are under restoration for either display or flight.

== Notable P-40 pilots ==
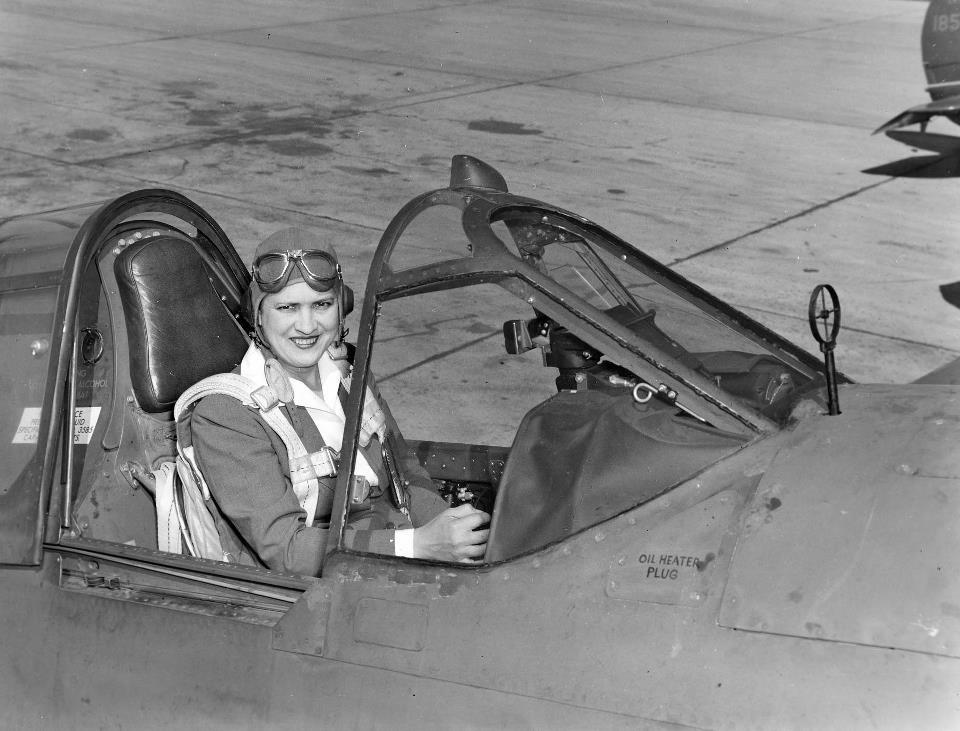
Jackie Cochran in the cockpit of a P-40 fighter aircraft. She was head of the Women Airforce Service Pilots (WASP).

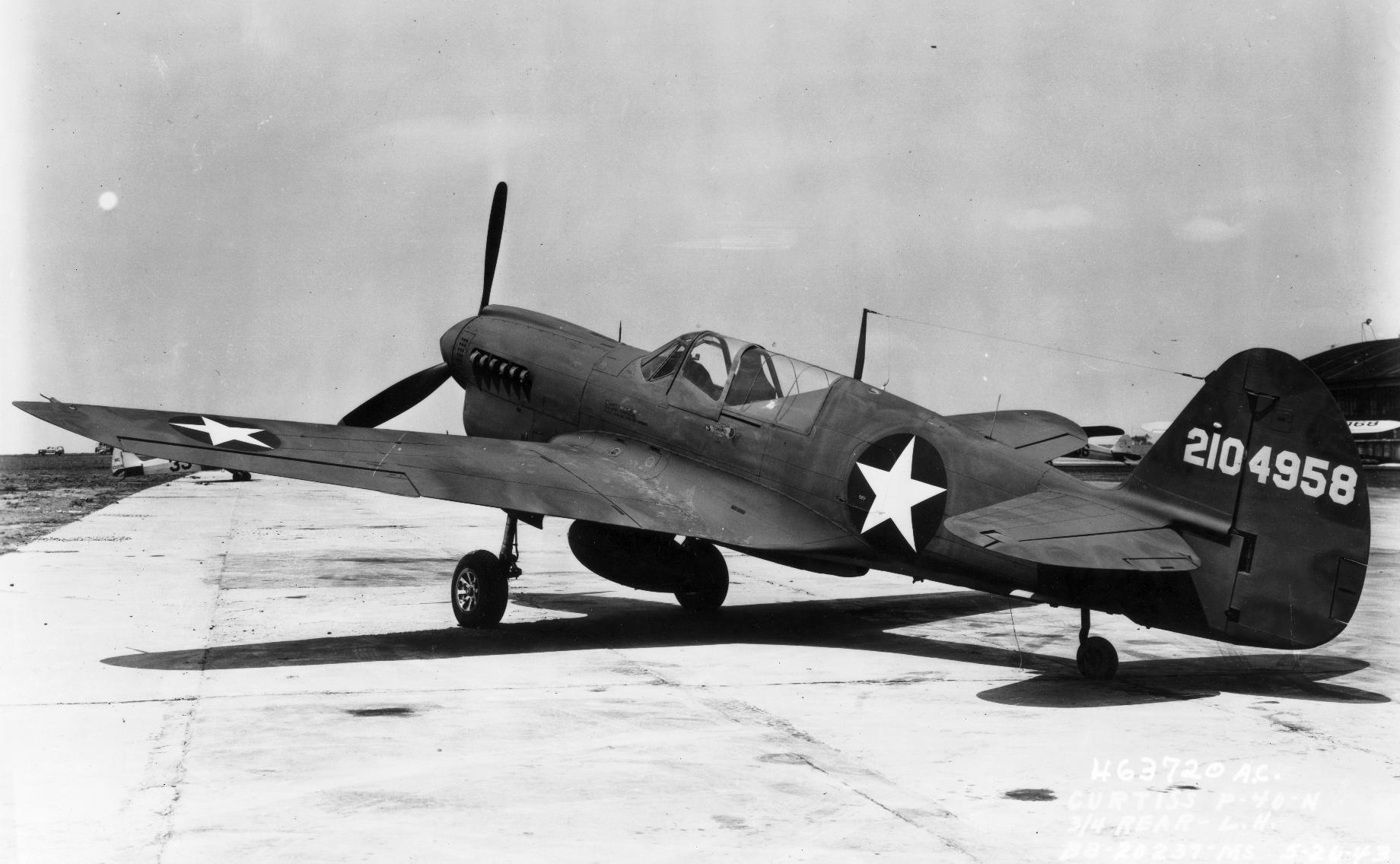
P-40N 44–7369

- Nicky Barr: RAAF ace (11 victories); also a member of the Australia national rugby union team.
- Gregory Boyington: AVG/US Marine Corps; later commanded USMC VMF-214, the "Black Sheep Squadron".
- Clive Caldwell: RAAF, highest-scoring P-40 pilot from any air force (22 victories); highest-scoring Allied pilot in North Africa; Australia's highest-scoring ace in World War II (28.5 victories).
- Levi R. Chase: USAAF; leading US P-40 ace in the Mediterranean theater, with 10 claims; CO 60th Fighter Squadron, 33rd Fighter Group; retired with the rank of Major General.
- Claire Chennault: commander, 1st American Volunteer Group (AVG; better known as the "Flying Tigers"), Chinese Air Force.
- Chikai Chou, the CO of the Chinese Air Force P-40E-equipped 23rd PS, 4th PG and ace who famously "hijacked" a USAAF P-66 at Liangshan Airbase as it was being raided by Imperial Japanese Army Air Service aircraft; he pursued the raiders shooting down two Kawasaki Ki-48 bombers, while 11 of his comrade's P-40Es were destroyed on the ground in that raid.
- Daniel H. David: USAAF; later famous as the comedian and actor Dan Rowan; scored two victories and was wounded, while flying P-40s in the South West Pacific.
- Billy Drake: RAF, the leading British P-40 ace, with 13 victories.
- Neville Duke: RAF Leading Allied ace in the Mediterranean theater with 27 victories (including eight in P-40); post-war a test pilot and holder of the world air speed record.
- James Francis Edwards: RCAF, 15.75 victories (12 on the P-40); also wrote two books about British Commonwealth Kittyhawk pilots.
- Geoff Fisken: RNZAF, the highest scoring British Commonwealth ace in the Pacific theater (11 victories), including five victories in Kittyhawks.
- Jack Frost: SAAF, the highest scoring air ace in a South African unit, with 15 victories (seven on the P-40); missing in action since 16 June 1942.
- Herschel "Herky" Green: USAAF; 18 victory claims (including three in P-40s) while flying for the 325th Fighter Group in North Africa and Italy.
- John Gorton: RAAF; Prime Minister of Australia, 1968–1971. Gorton survived a near-fatal crash in a Hurricane IIb at Singapore in 1942; later flew Kittyhawks with No. 77 Squadron in New Guinea and became an instructor on the type.
- David Lee "Tex" Hill: AVG/USAAF, 2nd Squadron AVG and 23rd FG USAAF, 12¼ P-40 victories (18¼ total).
- Bruce K. Holloway: AVG/USAAF, equal top-scoring US P-40 pilot (13 victories); later commander of USAF Strategic Air Command and retired with the rank of General (four star).
- James H. Howard: AVG/USAAF, six victories in P-40s; later, the only fighter pilot to receive the Medal of Honor for service over Europe, while flying a P-51; retired with the rank of Brigadier-General in 1966.
- Nikolai Fedorovitch Kuznetsov: VVS; the highest-scoring Soviet P-40 ace; credited with 22 victories while flying Hurricanes, P-40s and P-39s; twice awarded Hero of the Soviet Union (GSS); also awarded the British OBE.
- Pyotr Pokryshev: (Pyotr Afanasyevich Pokryshev) AV-MF (Soviet Naval); twice awarded GSS; 11 victory claims (out of a total of 22) made while flying P-40s, as commander of 154th IAP.
- Boris Safonov: AV-MF (Soviet Naval Aviation); Soviet quadruple (25 victory) ace and twice awarded GSS; shot down three Ju-88 bombers in one engagement while flying a P-40E, over the Baltic.
- Robert Lee Scott, Jr.: USAAF, commander of the 23rd FG, China; more than 10 victories in P-40s.
- Kenneth M. Taylor: USAAF; one of only two US pilots to get airborne (in a P-40) during the attack on Pearl Harbor (7 December 1941), during which he shot down two aircraft and was wounded in the arm.
- Keith Truscott: RAAF; pre-war star of Australian football; became an ace flying Spitfires in the UK during 1941, before flying Kittyhawks over New Guinea and Australia; commanded 76 Sqn RAAF at the Battle of Milne Bay (1942); killed in an accident while flying a P-40 (1943).
- Clinton D. "Casey" Vincent: USAAF; six victory claims while flying P-40s over China.
- John Waddy: RAAF; 12½ victory claims while flying P-40s over North Africa.
- Boyd Wagner: USAAF; while flying P-40s, Wagner became the first USAAF ace of the war, during the Philippines campaign (1941–1942).
- Len Waters: RAAF, the only Aboriginal Australian fighter pilot of World War II.
- George Welch: USAAF; one of only two US fighter pilots to get airborne during the first attack on Pearl Harbor, in a P-40; Welch claimed three Japanese aircraft that day.

== Specifications (P-40E) ==
P-40E

Data from Curtiss Aircraft 1907–1947, America's hundred thousand : the U.S. production fighter aircraft of World War II

General characteristics

- Crew: One
- Length: 31 ft 8.5 in (9.665 m)
- Wingspan: 37 ft 3.5 in (11.367 m)
- Height: 10 ft 8 in (3.25 m)
- Wing area: 236 sq ft (21.9 m^{2})
- Airfoil: root: NACA2215; tip :NACA2209
- Empty weight: 5,922 lb (2,686 kg)
- Gross weight: 8,515 lb (3,862 kg)
- Powerplant: 1 × Allison V-1710-39 V-12 liquid-cooled piston engine, 1,240 hp (920 kW)
- Propellers: 3-bladed Curtiss-Wright electric constant-speed propeller

Performance

- Maximum speed: 361 mph (581 km/h, 314 kn) at 15,000 ft (4,600 m)
- Cruise speed: 308 mph (496 km/h, 268 kn)
- Range: 716 mi (1,152 km, 622 nmi) at 70% power
- Service ceiling: 29,100 ft (8,900 m)
- Time to altitude: 15,000 ft (4,600 m) in 6 minutes 15 seconds
- Wing loading: 35.1 lb/sq ft (171 kg/m^{2})
- Power/mass: 0.14 hp/lb (0.23 kW/kg)

Armament

- Guns: 6 × 0.5 in (12.7 mm) M2 Browning machine guns in the wings
- Bombs: 250 to 1,000 lb (110 to 450 kg) bombs to a total of 2,000 lb (910 kg) on hardpoints under the fuselage and two underwing

== See also ==
- Historical P-40C Tomahawk, homebuilt replica
- Jurca Pee-40, homebuilt replica
- Rowley P-40F, homebuilt replica
- W.A.R. P40E, homebuilt replica

Related development

- Curtiss P-36 Hawk
- Curtiss P-37
- Curtiss XP-42
- Curtiss XP-46
- Curtiss P-60

Aircraft of comparable role, configuration, and era

- Bell P-39 Airacobra
- Dewoitine D.520
- Hawker Hurricane
- Kawasaki Ki-61
- Lavochkin-Gorbunov-Gudkov LaGG-3
- Macchi C.202
- Messerschmitt Bf 109
- Mikoyan-Gurevich MiG-3
- Supermarine Spitfire
- Yakovlev Yak-1
- Rogožarski IK-3

Related lists

- List of aircraft of World War II
- List of fighter aircraft
- List of military aircraft of the United States
