= Marcel Jurca =

French designer of homebuilt aircraft

Marcel Jurca (1921 – 19 October 2001) was a prolific designer of homebuilt aircraft in France. He is best known for his Tempête and Sirocco designs.

== Early life ==
Born in Romania, Jurca was impressed by the PZL fighters which often flew over him. He learned to fly in a Grunau 9 primary glider while studying engineering. Having joined the Royal Romanian Air Force in 1940, he flew the Henschel Hs 129 in 1943-1944. He moved to France in 1948. After a period as a volunteer flying instructor on the Stampe et Vertongen SV.4, he worked in industry, including 15 years as a commercial director, and retired in 1983. He was naturalised French in 1965.

== Aircraft design ==
On moving to France, he missed having an aircraft to fly, so he created his own. His first attempt at aircraft design was the MJ-1, which he considered unsatisfactory. He then built a Jodel D-112 with the help of the Aéro-Club de Courbevoie at Saint-Cyr-l'École. It flew in 1954. Then, inspired by the Piel CP-40 Donald, he designed, built and flew the MJ-2. This was very successful, and he started selling plans for homebuilders.

In 1965 a factory in Nancy produced an MJ-5, and Jurca started Constructions Aéronautiques Lorraines Francois-Jurca & Cie, based in Nancy, but apparently this was not a successful venture. His designs have only ever been directly sold as plans for homebuilding. Most aircraft are designed for wood construction, but some builders have used other methods, for example steel tube and fabric, especially for fuselages. He considered all his designs to be fighters (except for the MJ-54), and all are taildraggers (with the exception of the MJ-6, MJ-66 and MJ-54).

In the mid 1960s, he considered that the American small P-51 Mustang replica homebuilt aircraft weren’t very realistic, and noticed that the Sirocco was about 2/3 the size of a Mustang. He set about designing that and other 2/3 scale warbirds, but he realised that he was having to make too many compromises, particularly in their overall appearance, and moved up to 3/4 scale warbird replicas.

Then his American agent encouraged him to design full-size versions, particularly for the American market. Initially reluctant, he measured a real Messerschmitt Bf 109 at the Friedrichshafen airshow and realised that it could accommodate 300 hp (224 kW) or 400 hp (298 kW) Lycoming engines. He went on to measure the Supermarine Spitfire at the Musée de l’air in Paris, and developed the 1/1 Spitfire plans, then the Bf 109 and Focke-Wulf Fw 190, followed by the Mustang, the design he was still developing on his death.

== Designs ==
MJ-1
Inspired by the lines of the Bf 109. Built in 1950 with a 45 hp (34 kW) Train engine, nicknamed “Jurmar“, but Jurca wasn’t satisfied with it – there were “too many errors of design”, and it never flew.

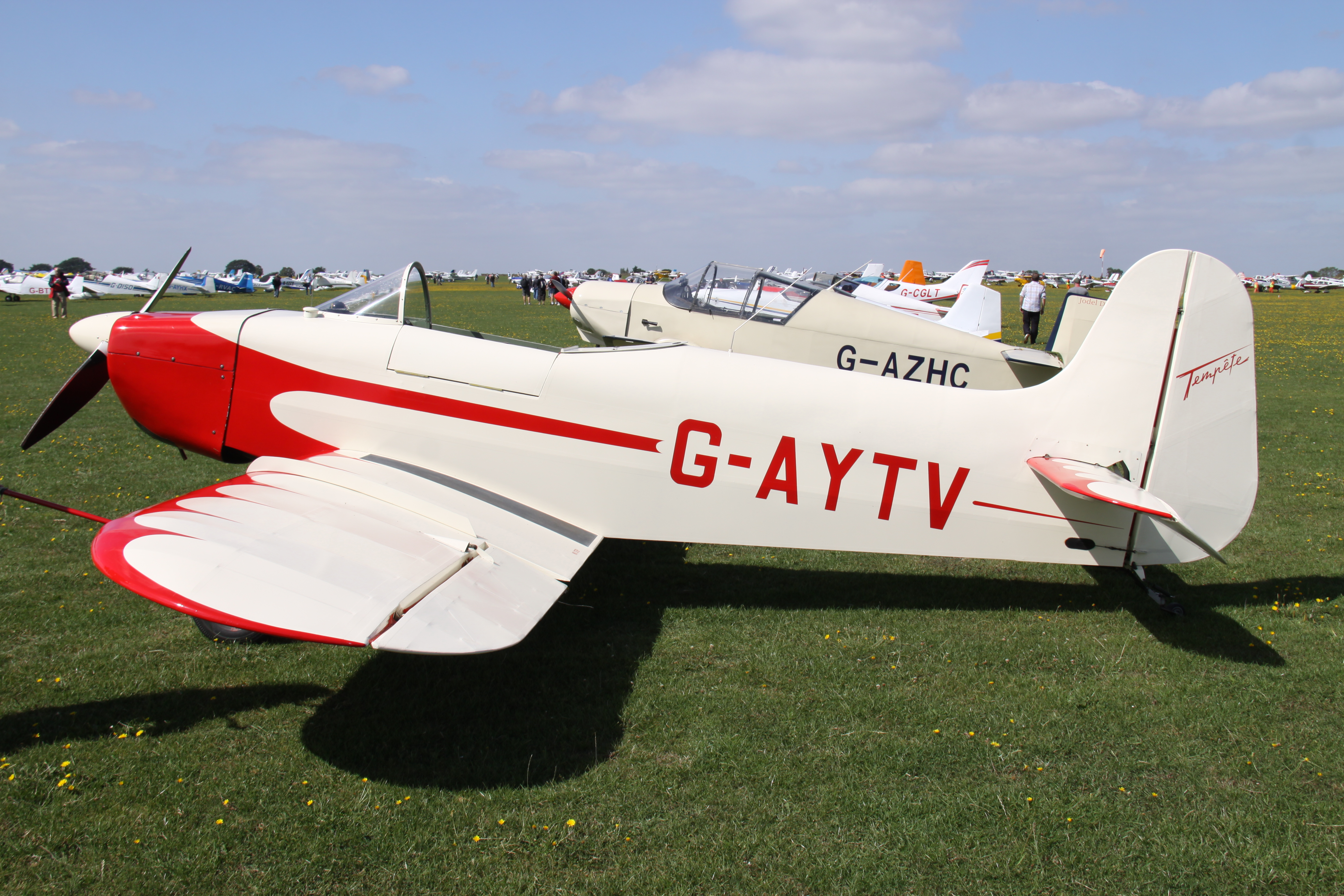
Jurca MJ-2D Tempête G-AYTV at Sywell Aerodrome

MJ-2 Tempête
Aerobatic single-seat tailwheel monoplane inspired by the Hawker Typhoon and including several features and parts from the Jodel. First flight June 1956. Can be built with a second seat for a passenger up to 55kg.
MJ-3H Dart
Fuselage of the MJ-2 with wings of MJ-5 and retractable gear. Only 1 built. First flight 1977.
MJ-4 Shadow
Single-seat retractable gear version of the MJ-2 with a swept fin.

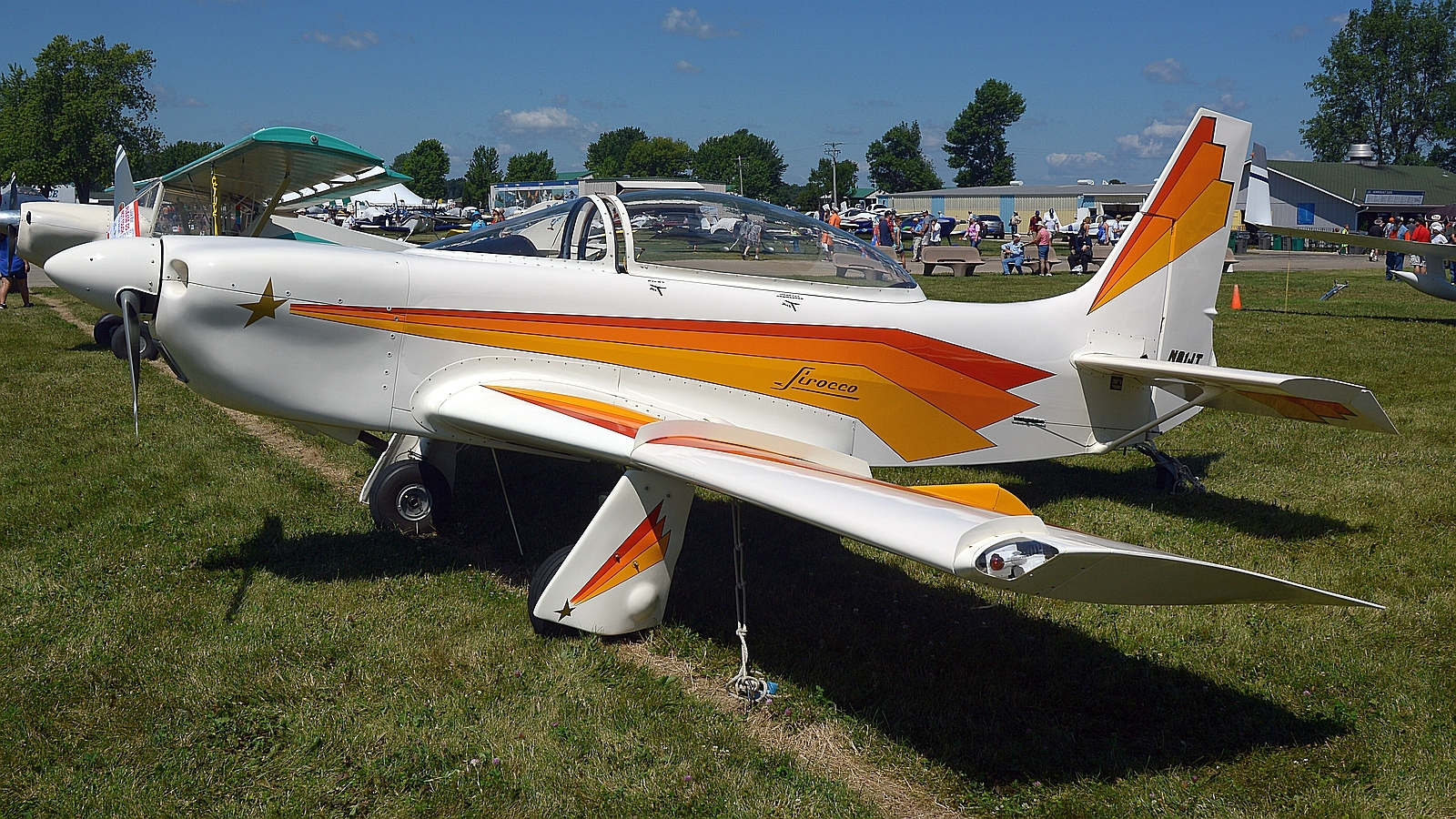
Jurca MJ-5 Sirocco N81JT at EAA AirVenture Oshkosh, Wisconsin, USA

MJ-5 Sirocco
Aerobatic 2-seat tandem fixed or retractable gear monoplane First flight 3 August 1962.
MJ-5 Sirocco Sport Wing
A version with wider wingspan specifically for the Australia and New Zealand markets.
MJ-6 Crivats aka “Lou Ventous”
Tandem twin-engined project with retractable tricycle gear, comparable to the Wing Derringer – construction started in 1964 but it was never completed.
MJ-7 Gnatsum
2/3 scale Mustang. The prototype was built by Falconar Avia in Edmonton, Canada with a 200 hp (149 kW) Ranger engine. First flight 31 July 1969.
MJ-7S Solo
MJ-7 without the underbelly air scoop, designed as a single-seat trainer.
MJ-8 One-Nine-0h
3/4 scale Focke-Wulf Fw 190. First flight in the USA in 1975.
MJ-9 One-Oh-Nine
3/4 scale Messerschmitt Bf 109.
MJ-10 Spit
3/4 scale Supermarine Spitfire IX with an optional second seat. First flight 1982.
MJ-11
1/1 scale Hawker Sea Fury.
MJ-12 Pee-40
Uncertain: 3/4 scale Curtiss P-40 or 1/1 scale P-40.
MJ-14 Fourtouna
Single-seat racer of wooden construction designed in 1971. One was started in the 1970s but was never completed. Semi-reclining seat.
MJ-15 Delta
2-seat project with a delta wing, retractable tricycle undercarriage and a pusher propeller, for engines from 200 to 600 hp (149 to 447 kW). Not built.
MJ-16 Vent
Single-seat project based on the MJ-2 with a tapered mid-wing and fixed landing gear – not built.
MJ-20 Tempête
Construction of this strengthened version with a 180 hp (134 kW) engine was started in Denmark but never completed.
MJ-22
Strengthened version of the MJ-2, with a 150 hp (112 kW) engine.
MJ-22 Bi-Tempête
Twin-fuselage Tempête project, never built.
MJ-23 Orage
Racer/aerobatic project. Not built.
MJ-25 Bise
Single-seat biplane project with wings based on the MJ-5. Not built.
MJ-50 Windy
Metal version of MJ-5.
MJ-51 Sperocco
Name derived from Special Sirocco . A high performance aerobatic 2-seat tandem low wing r/g monoplane with a modified fuselage from the MJ-5 and wings of the MJ-7.
MJ-52 Zéphyr
Light version of MJ-5 – fixed or retractable landing gear, flaps optional, with slightly staggered seats.
MJ-53 Autan
Aerobatic side-by-side fixed or retractable undercarriage version of the MJ-2. Reluctantly designed by Jurca, who preferred fighter-style aircraft. Prototype's first flight 20 December 1991.
MJ-54 Silas
2-seat high-wing single-engined cargo transport aircraft.
MJ55 Biso
Aerobatic 2-seater: an MJ-5 fuselage with an MJ-7 wing and a fixed undercarriage. Only one built - first flight 1997.
MJ-56 Sirocco S
No information.
MJ-58
1998 four-seat version of the MJ-53 Autan. Never completed.
MJ-66 Crivats
Side-by-side version of the MJ-6. Never completed.
MJ-70 Gnatsum
1/1 scale Mustang being designed when Jurca died. Never completed.

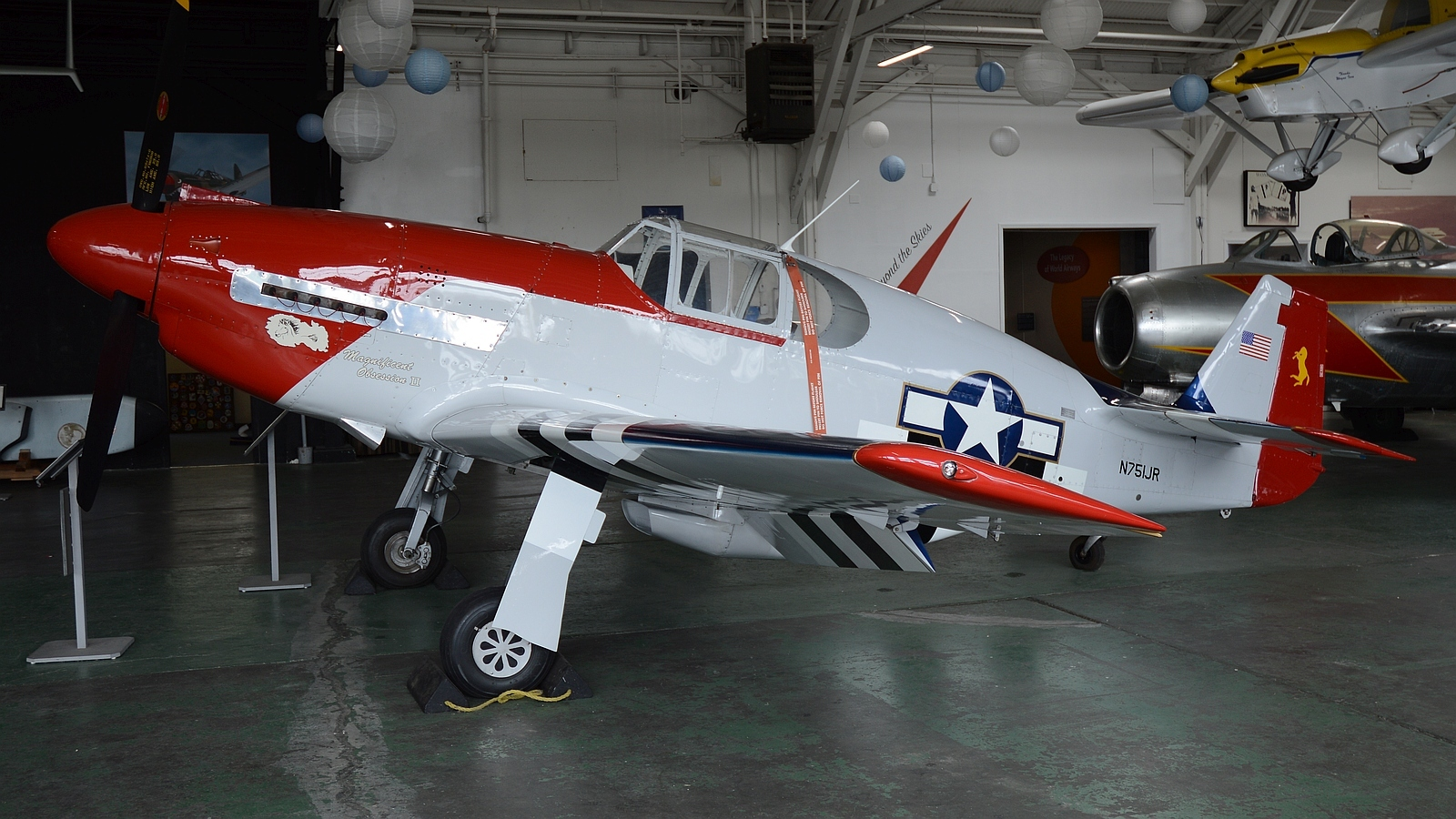
Jurca MJ-77 Gnatsum N751JR Magnificent Obsession II at the Oakland Aviation Museum

MJ-77 Gnatsum
3/4 scale Mustang 2-seater. Prototype built in California in 1969.
MJ-80
1/1 scale Focke-Wulf Fw 190. First example flew in Germany in 2006.
MJ-90
1/1 scale Bf 109.
MJ-100 Spitfire
1/1 scale plans published in 1988. Prototype first flown in 1994. Wooden or metal tube fuselage and wooden wings. Has been built with engines up to 1,325 hp (988 kW).
