= Isaacs Fury =

Fury
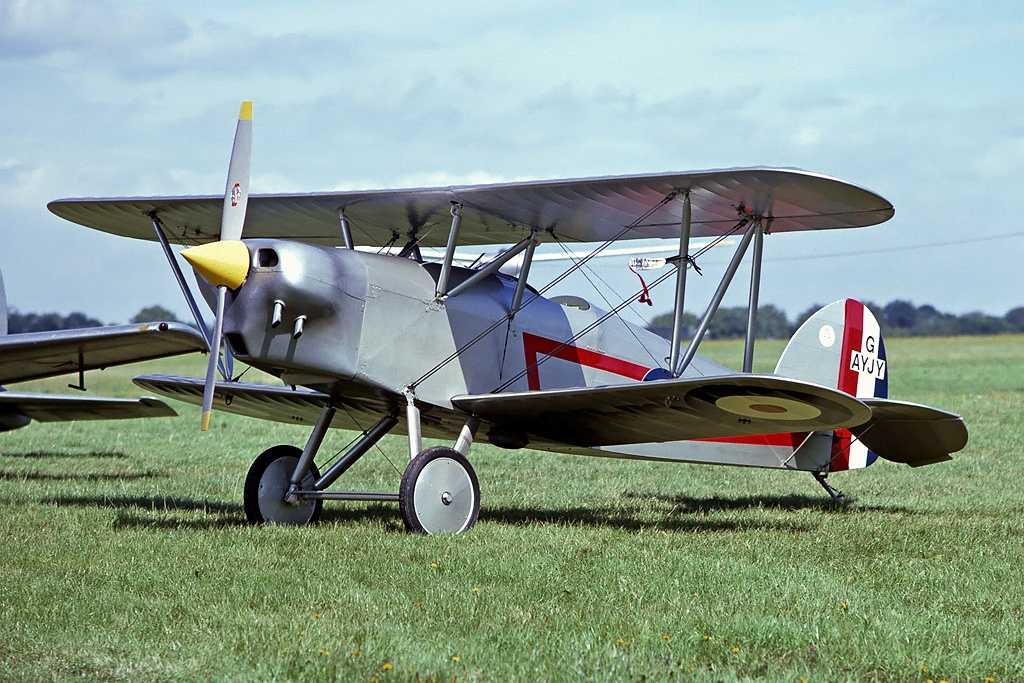
- Isaacs Fury II

General information
- Type: Sports biplane
- Manufacturer: Homebuilt
- Designer: John Isaacs
- Number built: 18

History
- First flight: 1963

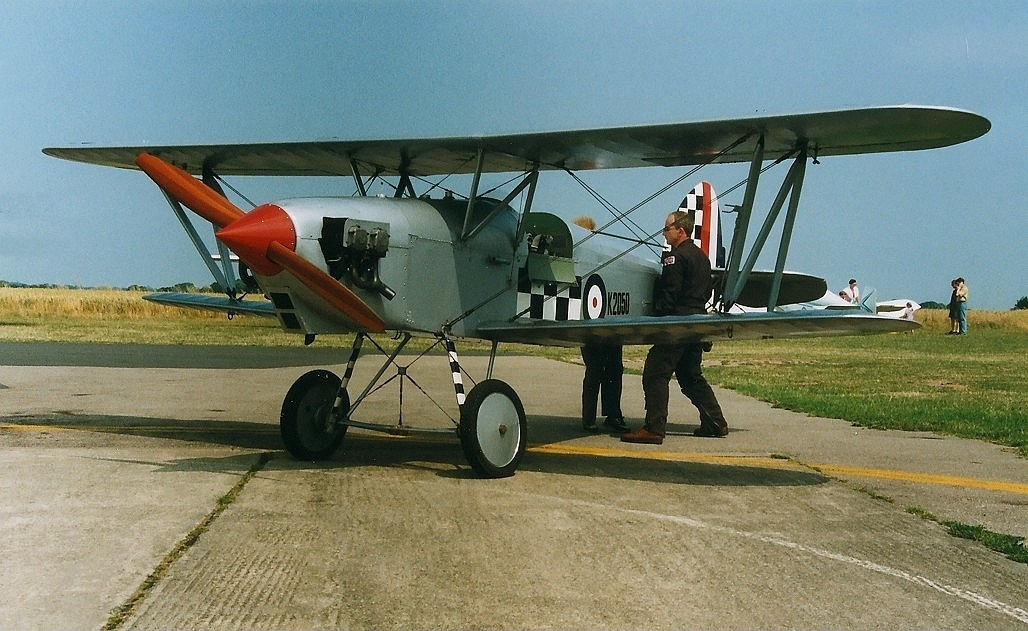
Isaacs Fury II

The Isaacs Fury is a British homebuilt sporting biplane designed by John Isaacs as a seven-tenths scale replica of the Hawker Fury fighter.

== Development ==
Using the Currie Wot construction methods as a basis, John Isaacs designed a single-seat wood and fabric sporting biplane for homebuilders. It was a seven-tenths replica of the 1935 Hawker Fury biplane fighter. It was a single-bay biplane with a fixed tailskid landing gear and powered by a 65 hp (48 kW) Walter Mikron III piston engine in the nose with a two-bladed propeller. It has a single-seat open cockpit just aft of the wing. The prototype (G-ASCM) built by the designer between 1961 and 1963 at Southampton, England, first flew from Thruxton Aerodrome on 30 August 1963.

Between 1966 and 1967 the aircraft was re-engined with a 125 hp (93 kW) Lycoming O-290-D engine and first flown as the Fury Mk 2 in May 1967. The design was made available to amateur constructors.

The rights to plans for the design are held by the UK Light Aircraft Association.

== Variants ==
Fury Mk 1
Prototype with a 65 hp (48 kW) Walter Mikron III piston engine.
Fury Mk 2
Prototype re-engined with a 125 hp (93 kW) Lycoming O-290-D piston engine for amateur construction.

== Specifications (Fury Mk 2) ==
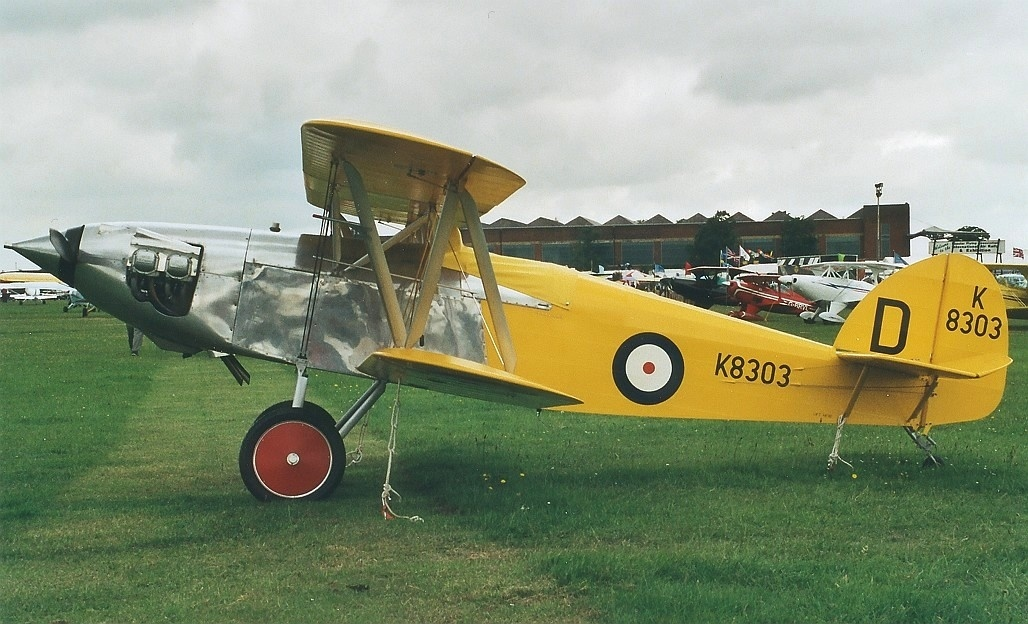
Fury II

Data from Taylor

General characteristics

- Crew: 1
- Length: 19 ft 3 in (5.87 m)
- Wingspan: 21 ft 0 in (6.4 m)
- Empty weight: 710 lb (322 kg)
- Gross weight: 1,000 lb (454 kg)
- Powerplant: 1 × Lycoming O-290-D piston engine , 125 hp (94 kW)

Performance

- Maximum speed: 115 mph (185 km/h, 100 kn)
- Cruise speed: 100 mph (161 km/h, 87 kn)
- Range: 200 mi (321 km, 170 nmi)
- Rate of climb: 1,600 ft/min (8.12 m/s)

== See also ==
- Isaacs Spitfire
