= Jurca Sirocco =

French homebuilt airplane

MJ-5 Sirocco
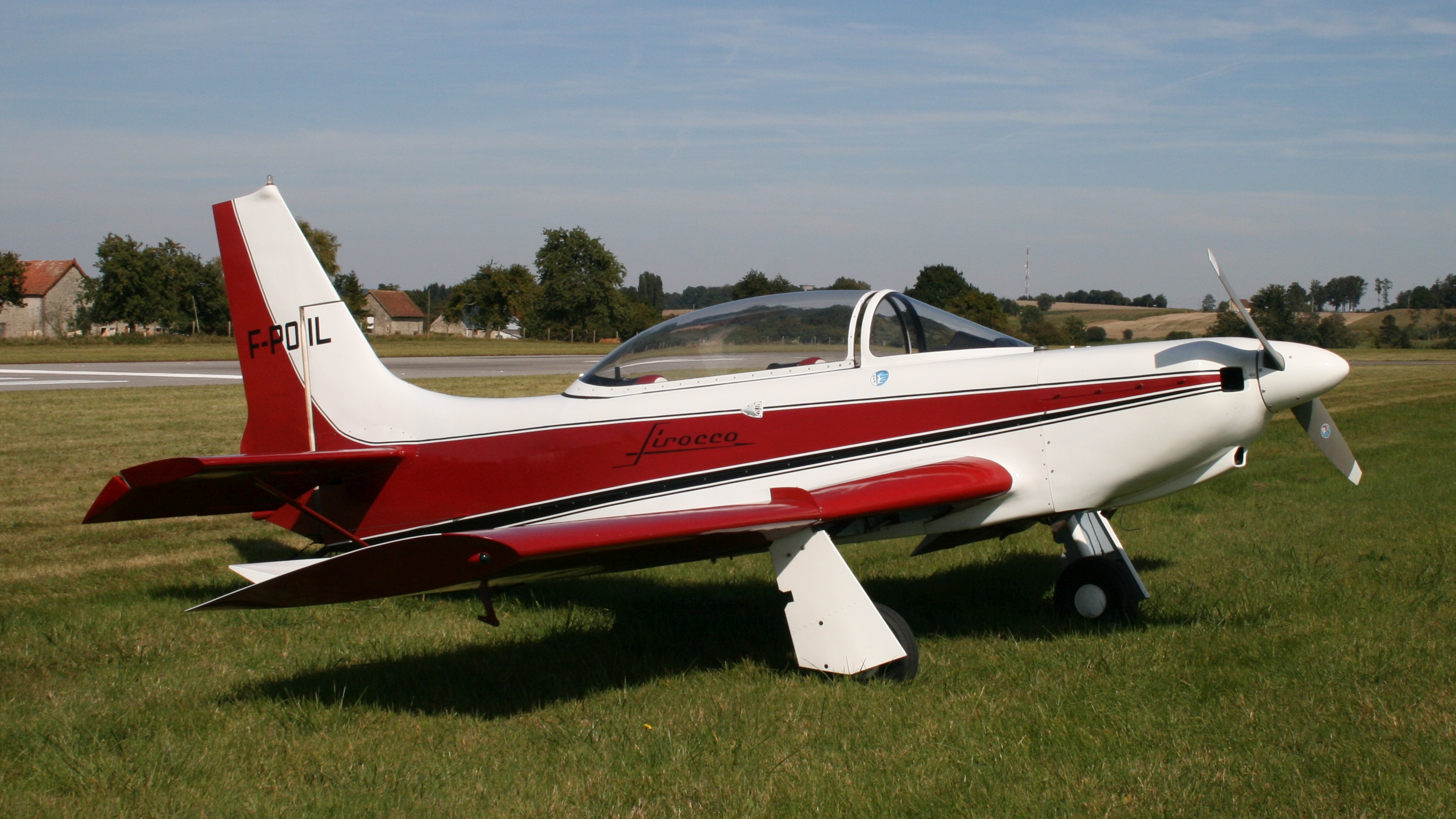

General information
- Type: Sport aircraft
- National origin: France
- Manufacturer: Homebuilt
- Designer: Marcel Jurca
- Number built: >80

History
- First flight: 25 July 1962
- Developed from: Jurca Tempete

The Jurca MJ-5 Sirocco (named for the Sirocco wind) is a two-seat sport aircraft designed in France in the early 1960s and marketed for homebuilding. It is one of many wooden homebuilt designs from Romanian born designer Marcel Jurca. Jurca, a Henschel Hs 129 pilot in World War II marketed the plans in Canada and America through Falconar Aviation. It is a low-wing cantilever monoplane of conventional configuration and wooden construction throughout. The tandem seats are enclosed by a bubble canopy, and the tailwheel undercarriage can be built as either fixed or with retractable main units. Marcel Jurca died on 19 October 2001, at which time plans were still available from the designer's website.

Plans are supplied by Avions Marcel Jurca and Manna Aviation of Australia.

== Variants ==
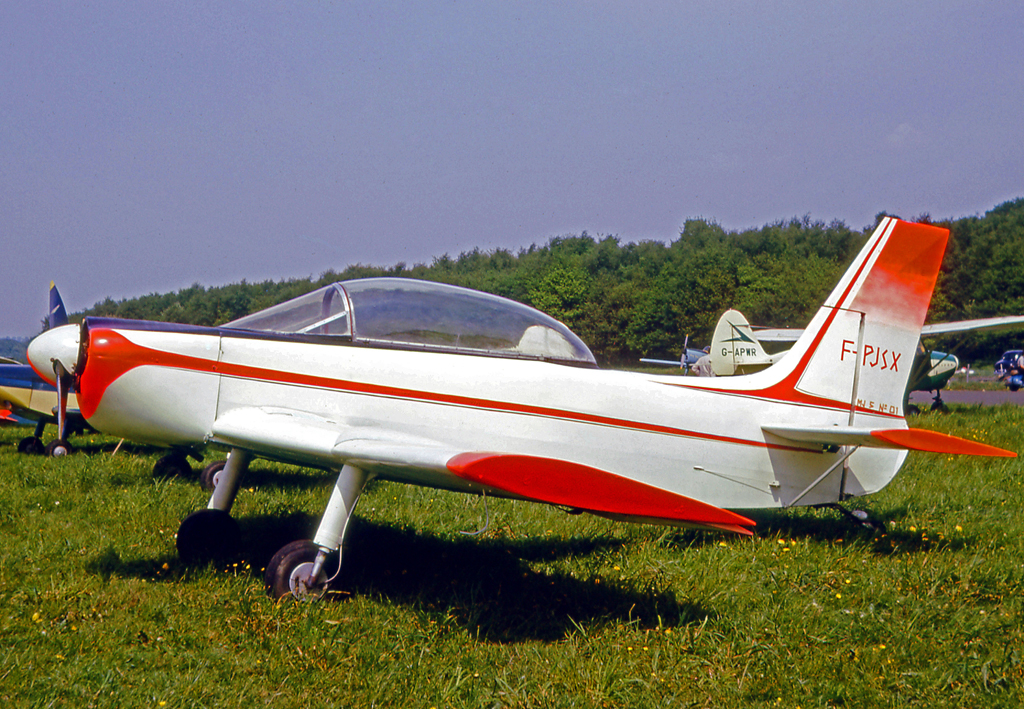
The prototype Jurca MJ-5 Sirocco exhibited at the 1965 Biggin Hill Air Fair at Biggin Hill Airport, Kent, in May 1965

MJ-5
Basic variant
The type of engine fitted, and the type of landing gear, are indicated by suffixes to the designation. For example MJ-5K2.
A - 67 kW (90 hp) Continental C90-8 or -14F
B - 74.5 kW (100 hp) Continental O-200-A
C - 78.5 kW (105 hp) Potez 4 E-20
D - 86 kW (115 hp) Lycoming O-235
E - 93 to 101 kW (125 to 135 hp) Lycoming O-290
EA - 104 kW (140 hp) Walter
F - 108 kW (145 hp) Continental
G - 112 kW (150 hp) Lycoming O-320
H - 119 kW (160 hp) Lycoming O-320
J - 123 kW (165 hp) Franklin
K - 134 kW (180 hp) Lycoming O-360
L - 149 kW (200 hp) Lycoming O-360
M - 164 kW (220 hp) Franklin:
1 - Fixed landing gear, 2 - retractable landing gear
MJ-50 Windy
All-metal version with retractable landing gear (never built)
MJ-51 Sperocco
("Special Sirocco") - performance version with wing taken from the Jurca Gnatsum
MJ-52 Zéphyr
(English: Zephyr wind) - utility version with converted Volkswagen automotive engine or Continental A65
MJ-53 Autan
(English: Autan wind) - version with side-by-side seating - two built
MJ-55 Biso
(English: Biso wind) - aerobatic version with the wings of the Jurca Gnatsum without flaps. It had a smaller tail and a fixed aluminium blade landing gear. Only one was built, with a 134 kW (180 hp) Lycoming engine. First flown in 1998, it crashed in 2000 due to gluing errors in construction.

== Specifications (MJ-5D) ==
Data from Jane's All the World's Aircraft 1993–94

General characteristics

- Crew: 1
- Capacity: 1 passenger
- Length: 6.15 m (20 ft 2 in)
- Wingspan: 7.00 m (23 ft 0 in)
- Height: 2.80 m (9 ft 2 in) (tail up)
- Wing area: 10.00 m^{2} (107.6 sq ft)
- Aspect ratio: 4.90:1
- Empty weight: 430 kg (948 lb)
- Max takeoff weight: 680 kg (1,499 lb)
- Powerplant: 1 × Textron Lycoming O-235-C2B air-cooled flat-four engine, 86 kW (115 hp)

Performance

- Maximum speed: 235 km/h (146 mph, 127 kn)
- Cruise speed: 215 km/h (134 mph, 116 kn)
- Stall speed: 80 km/h (50 mph, 43 kn)
- Endurance: 4 hr 20 min
- Service ceiling: 5,000 m (16,000 ft)
- Time to altitude: 4 min to 1,000 m (3,280 ft)
- Takeoff run: 250 m (820 ft)
- Landing run: 200 m (656 ft)
