= John O. Isaacs =

- Born: 10 May 1920; Southampton, Hampshire, England
- Died: 1 April 2001 (aged 80); Romsey, Hampshire, England
- Other names: James Owen Isaacs
- Occupation: Aeronautical engineer
- Known for: Isaacs Fury

John Owen Isaacs (1920–2001) was an English aeronautical engineer, aircraft designer and builder.

Isaacs was born in Southampton, Hampshire on 10 May 1920. In August 1937 he became an apprentice aircraft engineer at the Supermarine Aviation Works, Woolston, Southampton. He left Supermarine in 1958 and became a further education lecturer at the Southampton Technical College until 1978.

He obtained a pilot's licence in 1946 and then used his engineering experience to build a Currie Wot biplane for the Hampshire Aero Club. In the early 1960s Isaacs went on to design a scaled down aircraft based on the Hawker Fury; this was followed by a scaled-down design based on the Supermarine Spitfire. He made plans available for the two designs to enable them to be built at home by amateurs. He inspired and helped many amateur builders.

In 1988, he wrote his autobiography An Aeroplane Affair. He died in 2001.

== Aircraft designs ==
- Isaacs Fury
- Isaacs Spitfire
