= Southern Heritage Air Museum =

- Location within Louisiana
- Established: November 2012
- Location: Tallulah, Louisiana
- Coordinates: 32.3537°N 91.0250°W
- Type: Aviation museum
- Founder: Dan Fordice
- Website: www.southernheritageair.org/museum

The Southern Heritage Air Museum is an aviation museum located at the Vicksburg Tallulah Regional Airport near Tallulah, Louisiana.

== History ==
The Southern Heritage Air Foundation was founded by Dan Fordice and his father Kirk Fordice, a former Mississippi governor, in 2004. The following year, the foundation began the annual Southern Heritage Air Show at the Vicksburg Tallulah Regional Airport.

Following an agreement which saw the foundation's hangar donated to the airport and then leased from it for a nominal sum, it opened the Southern Heritage Air Museum in mid-November 2012.

== Facilities ==
The museum's building includes an 11,000 sq ft (1,000 m^{2}) display area.

== Collection ==
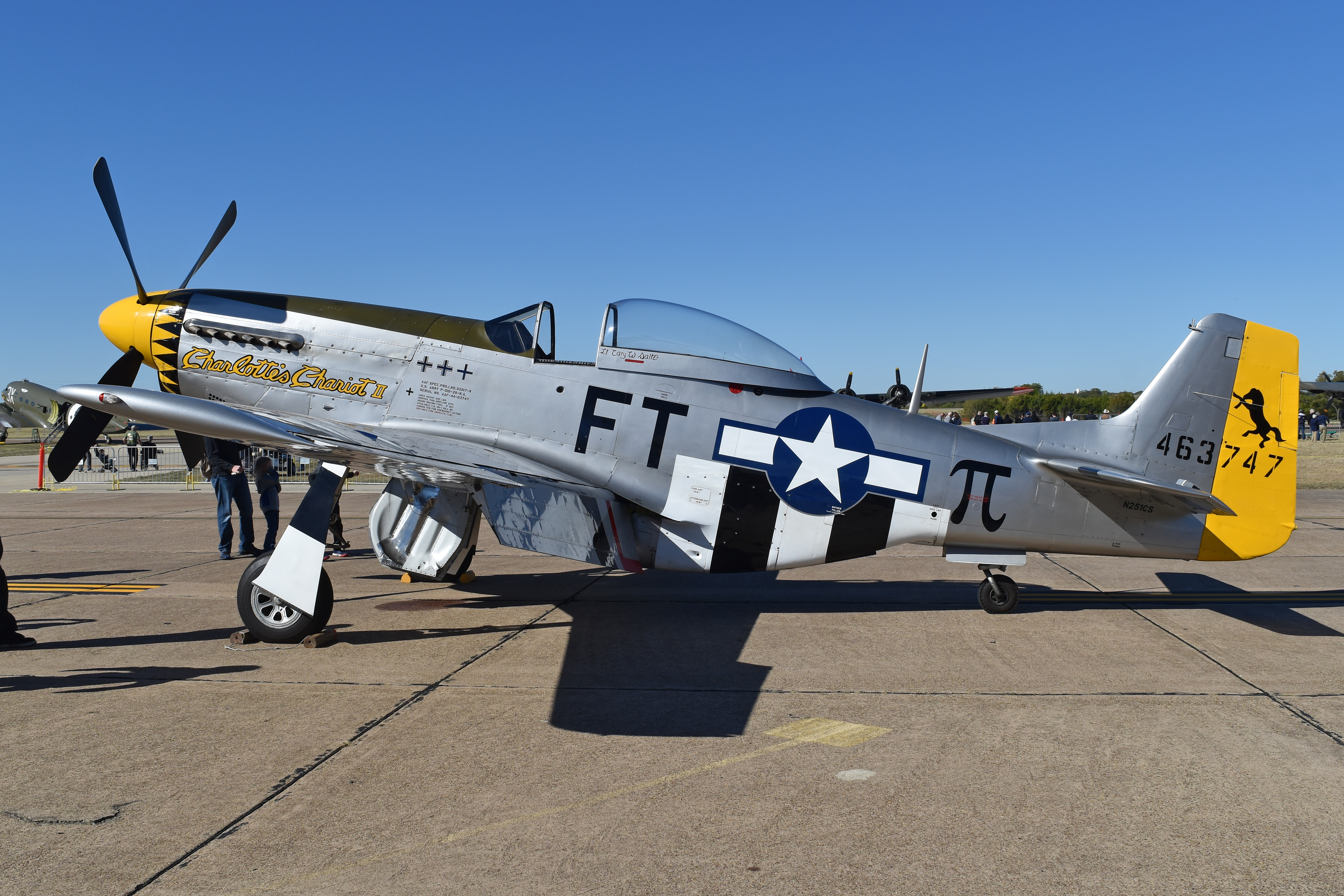
The museum's North American P-51D Mustang Charlotte’s Chariot II at the Wings Over Dallas Airshow in 2019

- Aviat Husky
- Beechcraft D18S
- Isaacs Spitfire
- North American AT-6 Texan
- North American P-51D Mustang
- Stinson L-5 Sentinel
- Waco YMF-5
- Yakovlev Yak-9U

== Events ==
The museum hosts an annual warbird formation clinic. (Note: Two members of the museum's board are also members of the Aeroshell Aerobatics Team.)

== Programs ==
The museum offers rides in four of its aircraft.
