= Jurca Spit =

MJ-10 Spitfire

General information
- Type: Replica warbird
- National origin: France
- Manufacturer: Homebuilt
- Designer: Marcel Jurca

History
- First flight: 1982

The Jurca MJ-10 Spitfire is a sport aircraft designed by Marcel Jurca in France as a replica of the Supermarine Spitfire and marketed for homebuilding. Plans for two versions were produced, the MJ-10, at 3/4 scale, and the MJ-100, at full-scale. Construction throughout is of wood, and the builder may choose to complete the aircraft with either a single seat or two seats in tandem. The version represented is the Mk.IX Spitfire, but allowances are made to allow the builder to portray other versions, in particular the Mk.Vc and the Mk.XIV. Additionally, the MJ-100 version may be built with a fuselage structure of welded steel tube if desired. Plans for both versions were marketed by Falconar and later Jurca Plans West.

As of July 2017 two MJ-100s are known to have flown, one each in France (the prototype, F-WGML, originally with a Hispano-Suiza but later refitted with an Allison V-1710) and the USA (with a V-1710), with several others under construction around the world.

== Variants ==
- MJ-10 - 3/4 scale version
- MJ-100 - full-scale version

== Specifications (MJ-10) ==
Data from Jane's All the World's Aircraft 1988–89

General characteristics

- Crew: 1
- Length: 7.12 m (23 ft 4 in)
- Wingspan: 8.40 m (27 ft 7 in)
- Wing area: 12.60 m^{2} (135.6 sq ft)
- Empty weight: 658 kg (1,451 lb)
- Max takeoff weight: 907 kg (2,000 lb)
- Powerplant: 1 × horizontally-opposed or inline piston engine, 120 kW (160 hp)

Performance

- Maximum speed: 257 km/h (160 mph, 139 kn)
- Cruise speed: 230 km/h (140 mph, 120 kn)
- Stall speed: 90 km/h (56 mph, 49 kn)
- Rate of climb: 8.4 m/s (1,650 ft/min)

== See also ==
Aircraft of comparable role, configuration, and era

- Isaacs Spitfire
- Sindlinger Hawker Hurricane
- Supermarine Aircraft Spitfire
