= Supermarine Aircraft Spitfire =

Homebuilt replica aircraft

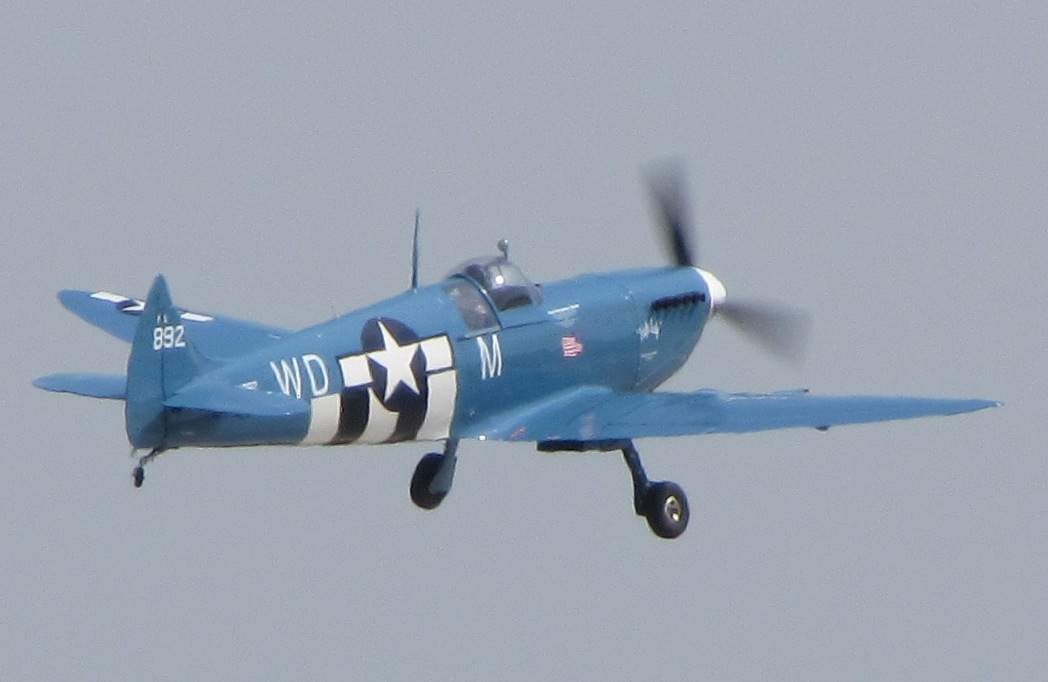

General information
- Type: Homebuilt aircraft
- National origin: United States; originally Australia
- Manufacturer: Supermarine Aircraft
- Designer: Michael O'Sullivan
- Number built: 100 (December 2011)

History
- First flight: November 1994

The Supermarine Aircraft Spitfire is a homebuilt aircraft produced in kit form by Supermarine Aircraft. A replica of the famous British Supermarine Spitfire World War II fighter, it was originally produced to 75% scale. Subsequent models have increased the scale of the fuselage and added a second seat.

Supermarine Aircraft – a company unconnected to the original manufacturer of the Spitfire – commenced operations in 1994, in Australia. It later moved its factory to Cisco Airport, Texas and its head office to the nearby town of Clyde.

== Design and development ==
Australian pilot and aviation engineer Mike O'Sullivan had always wanted a Spitfire and built a replica for his own use in 1991. This was followed by a 75 hp (56 kW), Rotax-powered prototype in 1994. The next year, in 1995, he joined with business partner John McCarron to form the Supermarine Aircraft company and produce all-Australian home-build aircraft kits. In the event, the constant-speed, four-blade propeller would be obtained from a specialist firm in New Zealand. Supermarine Aircraft is not related to the original British Supermarine company, although the owners of the Supermarine marque have given their permission for the name to be used.

The first production model was named the Spitfire Mk 25 and was a 75% scale replica of the original Supermarine Spitfire design. The stressed-skin structure consists of 2024 aluminium alloy skins, formers and longerons with some fibre-glass mouldings for parts such as fairings and air scoops. The design features electrically operated retractable undercarriage, with differential braking to the main wheels, and landing flaps.

The later Spitfire Mk 26 uses the Mk 25 wings with the fuselage increased to 80% scale to provide room for a passenger seat in tandem behind the pilot. The Mk 26B has a 90% scale fuselage. The Spitfire kit has the same power-to-weight ratio as the original.

The aircraft was reviewed by the Australian Ultralight Federation in 2001. It was approved as meeting Australian rules for kit-built aircraft. Supermarine began promoting the kit plane to the US market in 2004. The aircraft has been approved by the British Light Aircraft Association.

By 2009, the company had sold 92 aircraft world-wide. The company reported completing its 100th aircraft by December 2011.

=== Powerplant ===
The prototype Mk 25 was initially fitted with a Rotax engine, before development progressed through a series of more powerful Jabiru types. Early production models were powered by eight-cylinder, 200 hp (149 kW) Jabiru engines made in Australia. Subsequently, the company introduced a V6 Isuzu engine conversion, producing 260 or 320 hp (194 or 239 kW) with supercharger, as well as a V8 General Motors automotive engine conversion producing 430 hp (321 kW).

Early versions of the Spitfire Mk 26 used an eight-cylinder 180 hp (134 kW) Jabiru 5100 horizontally opposed aero engine, but early installations suffered from inadequate cooling. The company now offers a V6 engine. The normally aspirated version of this engine produces 226 hp (169 kW) with a supercharged version producing up to 310 hp (231 kW).

The maximum rpm of a propeller (at about 2800 depending on its diameter) is about half that at the maximum torque/power rpm of about 5500 rpm for a car engine, which therefore must be fitted with a drive reduction unit. Such units absorb about 20% of the engine power and therefore the normally aspirated Isuzu unit delivers the same maximum power as the Jabiru 5100. Recent developments of the Jabiru engine range by Rotec have produced replacement water-cooled cylinder heads for the 5100. This has removed the overheating problems and also allowed the nose cowling of the Mk26 to be reshaped to remove the air intake and considerably reduce the frontal area to be in keeping with the original sleek design of the Spitfire.

== Construction ==
Construction of the Spitfire requires metalworking skills and tools and makes extensive use of aviation grade pull rivets or pop rivets. Pre-assembled kits are provided but still leave the builder with 1,200 man-hours of work to be completed.

== Variants ==
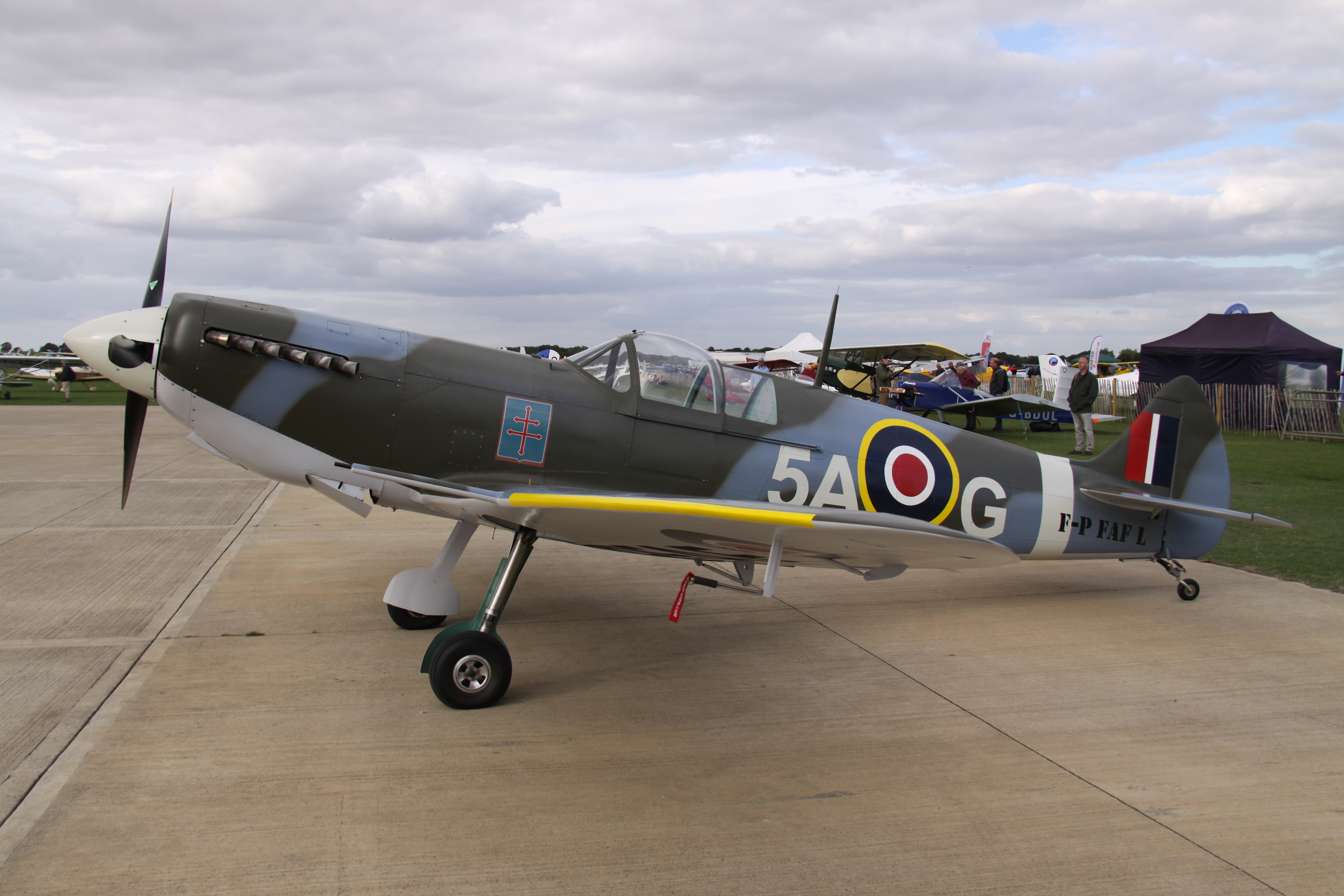
Side view of a Spitfire Mk 26, Sywell Airfield, 2013

Mk 25
Single-seat version, no longer produced, 75% scale. This was a true 'three-quarter' scale size of the original World War Two Spitfire Mk 5.
Mk 26
Two-seat version. '80% scale'. Discontinued by 2011 in favor of the '90%' version. The '80% scale' refers only to the fuselage that was lengthened to 80% of the original Spitfire Mk 5. The same wing was used from the 75% scale aircraft, resulting in a wingspan and undercarriage height identical to the original 75% scale aircraft.

Mk 26B
Improved Mk 26. Option of dual controls, '90% scale'. Again the '90% scale' refers only to the fuselage, that was again lengthened (in fact to 89.5% the length of the original Spitfire Mk 5); the fuselage was also made fatter in the cockpit area. The same wing was used from the 75% scale aircraft, resulting in a wingspan and undercarriage height identical to the original 75% scale aircraft.

== Fatal incidents ==
After a fatal accident at Gympie, Australia, in October 2010, involving a Mk 26, the coroner reported, on December 29, 2014. The inquest concluded that Michael O’Sullivan, the CEO of Supermarine Pty Ltd, admitted that the aircraft test flight period had only been 20 hours instead of the 37.5 hours declared, that he had "knowingly falsified documents to achieve registration of his aircraft with RA-Aus (Recreational Aviation Australia), rather than the more stringent registration with CASA (Civil Aviation Safety Authority)", and he admitted to "significantly understating the weight of the aircraft (by about 200kg)" (around half of the aircraft's stated empty weight of 401 kg).

In 2013, a Mk 26 80% scale Spitfire crashed in Adelaide, Australia. The pilot, as the only passenger in the aircraft, died as a result of the accident. Official findings show pilot error as the main contributor of the accident, however, the ATSB report stated: "The aircraft was prone to aerodynamically stall with little or no aerodynamic precursors and it was not fitted with a stall warning device, increasing the risk of inadvertent stall."

In August 2023, a Mk 26B 90% scale Spitfire crashed near Enstone, Oxfordshire, England. During a test flight towards obtaining a Permit to Fly, control of the aircraft was lost. The flight was testing the effects of leading edge stall strips as part of an approved test programme. The pilot was fatally injured when the aircraft struck the ground. The aircraft was found to have been built with a misaligned fin and rudder. Whilst this may have made the aircraft susceptible to wing drop at the stall, it would not have prevented recovery from the stall or any subsequent spin or spiral dive. Pilot incapacitation or control restriction could not be eliminated as a cause.

Another Mk 26B Spitfire crashed at Enstone Airfield on 24 July 2024, killing the pilot, after the aircraft rolled to the left during takeoff. The crash remained under investigation as of late July 2025.

In Western Australia, on 24 June 2026, the pilot of a Mk 26B was killed when it crashed, approximately 90 km north-east of Perth, at Malabaine. The 76-year old man was reportedly undertaking post-construction flight testing, when the Spitfire unexpectedly lost altitude and struck terrain, a few kilometres east of Northam Airport, just before 10:50 am.

== Specifications (Mk 26B) ==
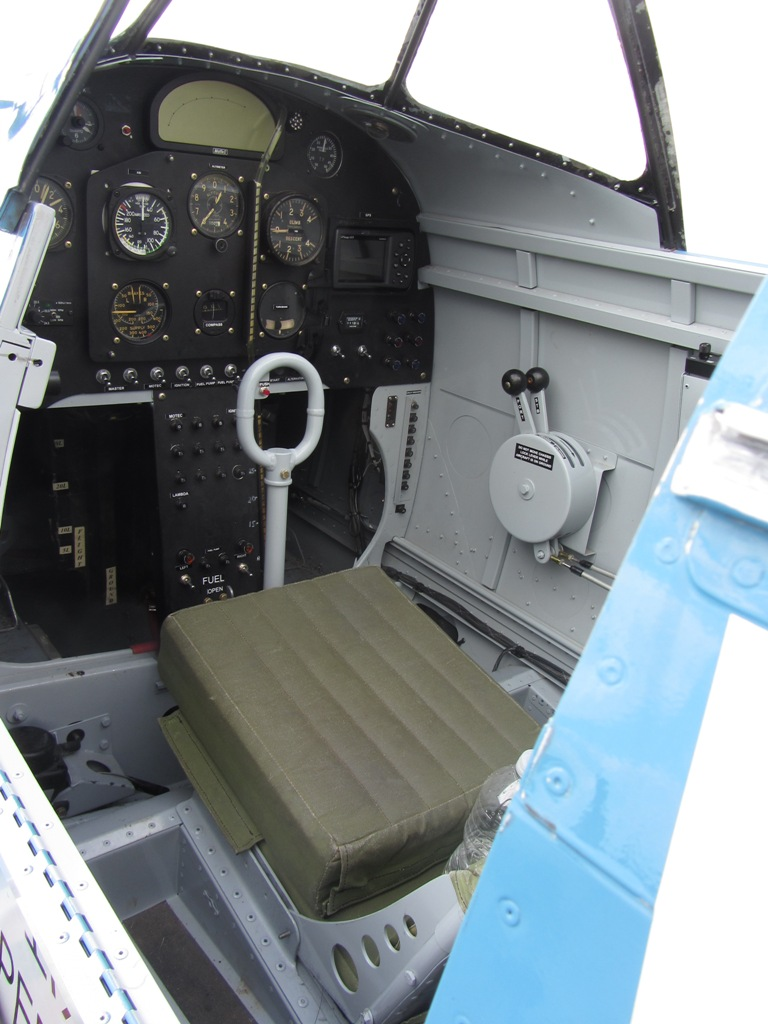
Instrument panel of the Mk 26B

Data from Supermarine Aircraft

General characteristics

- Length: 23 ft 9 in (7.24 m)
- Wingspan: 27 ft 8 in (8.43 m)
- Height: 6 ft 9 in (2.06 m)
- Wing area: 122 sq ft (11.3 m^{2})
- Empty weight: 992 lb (450 kg)
- Gross weight: 1,785 lb (810 kg)
- Powerplant: 1 × General Motors-Isuzu V6 liquid-cooled piston engine, 226 hp (169 kW)
- Propellers: 3-bladed Ivoprop composite propeller

Performance

- Maximum speed: 265 mph (426 km/h, 230 kn)
- Cruise speed: 184 mph (296 km/h, 160 kn)
- Stall speed: 48 mph (77 km/h, 42 kn)
- g limits: +6 -4 (limited aerobatics)
- Rate of climb: 2,500 ft/min (13 m/s)
- Wing loading: 14.6 lb/sq ft (71 kg/m^{2})

== See also ==
Related development

- 19-6054, three-quarter scale flying replica of Spitfire prototype K5054

Aircraft of comparable role, configuration, and era

- Isaacs Spitfire
- Jurca Spit
- Sindlinger Hawker Hurricane
