= Wetan =

Wetan may refer to:

- Wetan Island
- Wetan language
- Autan, also known as Wetan, a village in Syria
