= Turner Two Seat Wot =

British homebuilt aircraft design

Two Seat Wot
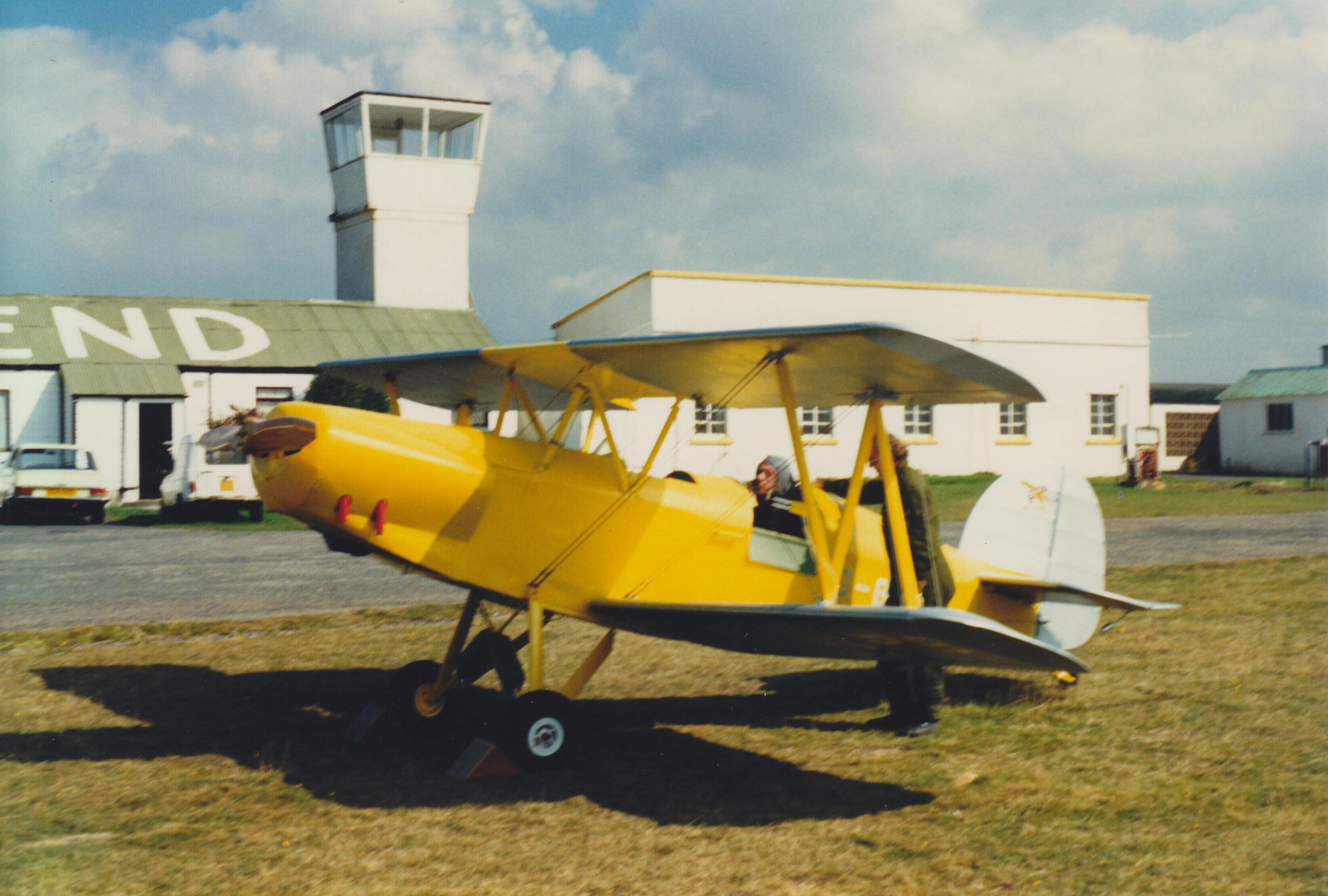
- The second example built, G-BLPB

General information
- Type: Homebuilt aircraft
- National origin: United Kingdom
- Designer: Chris Turner
- Status: Production completed (1986)
- Number built: 2

History
- Manufactured: 1976-1986
- First flight: 1978
- Developed from: Currie Wot

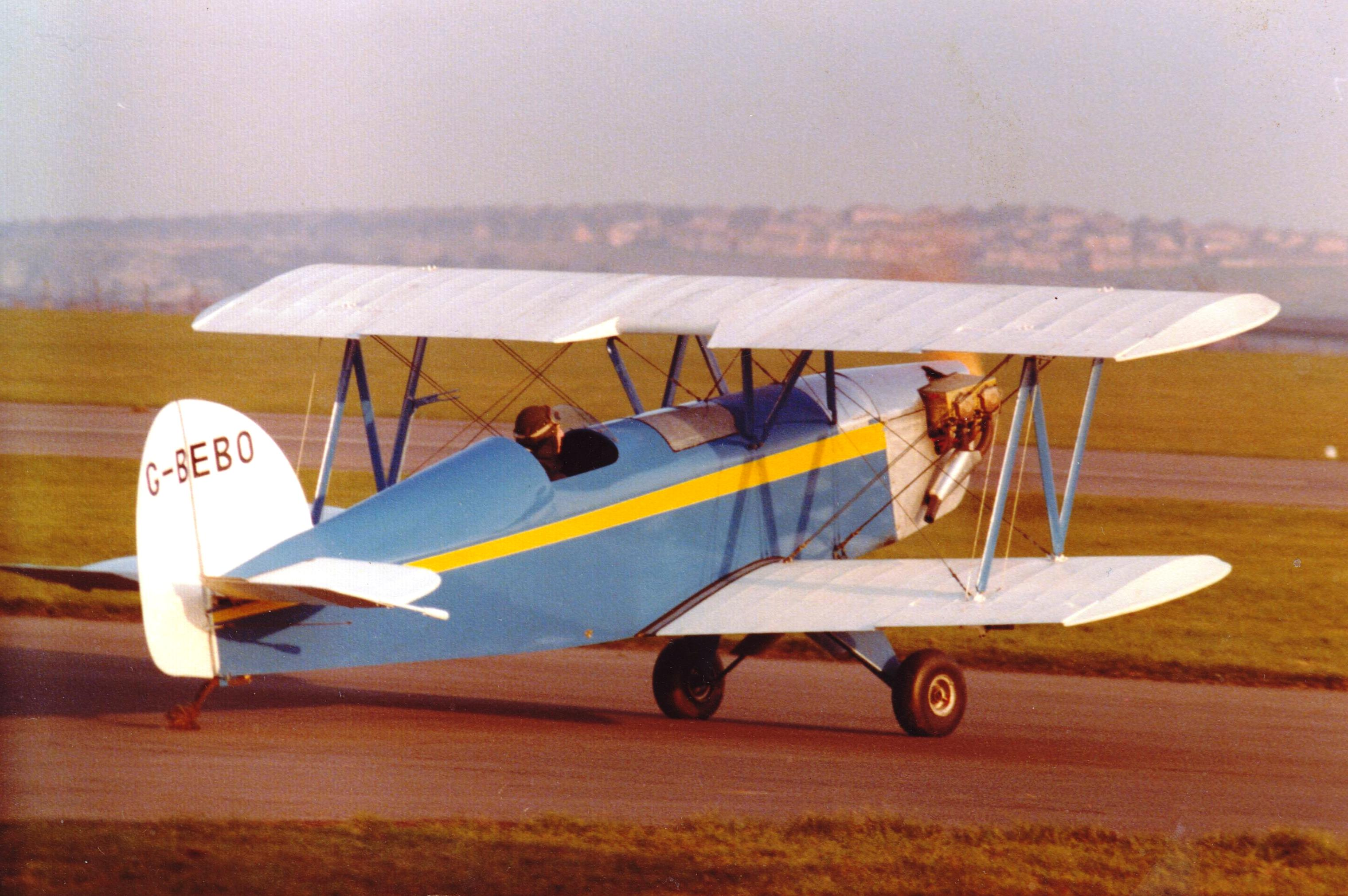
G-BEBO at Sunderland Airport

The Turner Two Seat Wot (TSW-2) is a biplane aircraft designed for amateur construction by Chris Turner in 1976.

== Design and development ==
The aircraft was originally conceived as a two seat version of the Currie Wot, however few component parts of the original Wot were retained by the time the design had been finalised. The Turner TSW-2 has a reduced wingspan, four ailerons and uses a different aerofoil section for the staggered wings. The aileron bellcrank fittings are however, made to the Currie Wot drawings.

The Turner Two Seat Wot's structure is primarily of wood with metal interplane struts, cabane struts, undercarriage and engine mount. Two examples were constructed: G-BEBO and G-BLPB. The prototype G-BEBO was fitted with a 125 hp (93 kW) Lycoming O-290-3 engine and G-BLPB a 150 hp (112 kW) Lycoming 0-320-A1A engine.

Chris Turner was awarded the Best New Design Award at the 1987 Popular Flying Association Rally at Cranfield, Bedfordshire.

The Turner TSW-2 is a design approved by the Light Aircraft Association, the delegated controlling body for homebuilt aircraft.

== Operational history ==
The prototype Turner TSW-2, G-BEBO, was built by its designer Chris Turner. It was registered with the Civil Aviation Authority on 30 June 1976 and first flown from Sunderland Airport in 1978. The aircraft was destroyed in a hangar fire at Hunday Farm and de-registered in January 2003.

This second example, G-BLPB, was built by James Woolford and Kingsley Thomas in Mullion Cornwall between 1980 and 1986. It first flew from Land's End Airport on 31 August 1986. This aircraft is still airworthy and in 2017 was based on a farm strip in Wiltshire.

The Turner TSW-2 was the subject of a test flight report in Popular Flying by John Harper, who stated that the aircraft was capable of executing the Aerobatics Association's Beginners Sequence of aerobatic manoeuvrers.
