= Jurca MJ-6 Crivats =

MJ-6

General information
- Type: Homebuilt aircraft
- National origin: France
- Designer: Marcel Jurca

The Jurca MJ-6 Crivats (from Crivăț a wind in Romania) is a plans built homebuilt, twin engine design from Romanian-born Marcel Jurca.

== Design ==
The MJ-6 was designed to be a retractable tricycle geared, low-wing, all-wood construction, twin engine homebuilt. The wooden structure is covered with 1/8" plywood panels. The engine gauges are mounted externally on the engine nacelles facing the pilot. The cowlings and canopy were to be sourced from Falconar Avia.

Construction was started in 1964, but it was never completed. It was a two-seat tandem design - a side-by-side version, the MJ-66 was also planned but never built.

== Specifications (MJ-6) ==
Data from Air Trails

General characteristics

- Crew: 1
- Capacity: 1
- Length: 8.76 m (28 ft 9 in)
- Powerplant: 2 × Lycoming or Continental , 110 kW (150 hp) each

Performance

- Maximum speed: 394 km/h (245 mph, 213 kn)

== See also ==
Aircraft of comparable role, configuration, and era

- Wing Derringer
