= Jurca One-Oh-Nine =

French homebuilt aircraft

MJ-9 One-Oh-Nine

General information
- Type: Replica warbird
- National origin: France
- Manufacturer: Homebuilt
- Designer: Marcel Jurca

The Jurca MJ-9 1-Oh-Nine is a sports aircraft designed in France in 1972 as a replica of the Messerschmitt Bf 109 and marketed for homebuilding. It is one of many wooden homebuilt designs from Romanian born designer Marcel Jurca. Jurca was a Henschel Hs 129 pilot in World War II who moved to France in 1948. Plans for two versions were produced, the MJ-9, at 3/4 scale, and the MJ-90, at full-scale.

Both versions can be built as single-seaters or with a second seat for a passenger no more than 1.5 m (4 ft 11 in) tall.

== Variants ==
- MJ-9 - 3/4 scale version
  - MJ-90 - full-scale version

== Specifications (MJ-9) ==
Data from Avions Marcel Jurca

General characteristics

- Crew: 1 pilot
- Length: 6.63 m (21 ft 9 in)
- Wingspan: 7.39 m (24 ft 3 in)
- Gross weight: 771 kg (1,700 lb)
- Powerplant: 1 × Ranger , 130 kW (180 hp)
- Propellers: 2-bladed

Performance

- Maximum speed: 310 km/h (190 mph, 170 kn)
- Cruise speed: 282 km/h (175 mph, 152 kn)
- Stall speed: 121 km/h (75 mph, 65 kn)
