= Isaacs Spitfire =

Spitfire
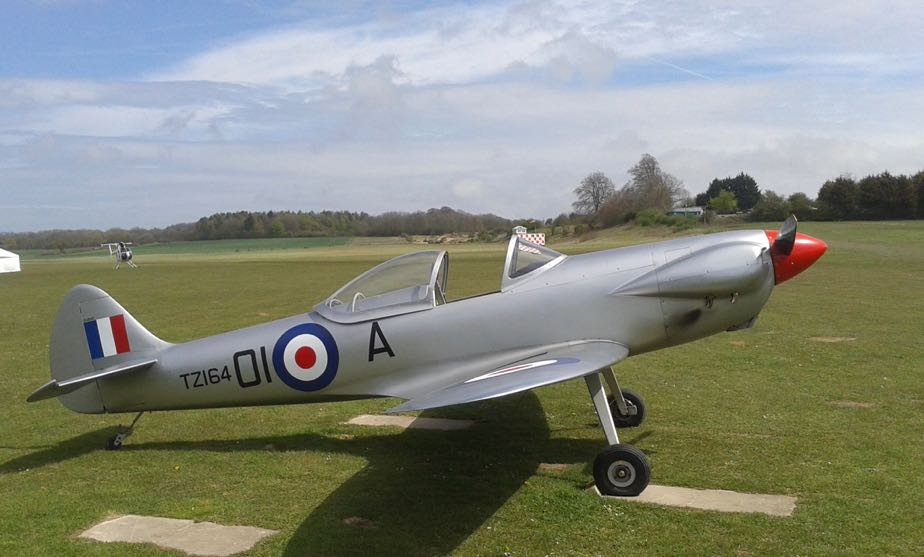
- Isaacs Spitfire G-ISAC

General information
- Type: Replica warbird
- Manufacturer: Homebuilt
- Designer: John O. Isaacs

History
- First flight: 5 May 1975

The Isaacs Spitfire is a single seat homebuilt sporting aircraft design created by John O. Isaacs, a former Supermarine employee and retired schoolmaster and designer of the Isaacs Fury, as a 6/10th scale replica of a Supermarine Spitfire. Its first flight was on 5 May 1975.

As per the original Spitfire, the Isaacs Spitfire was a cantilever low-wing monoplane of semi-elliptical planform. The twin spar wing was built in one piece, mainly of spruce with birch plywood skin. The fuselage was of identical construction. The landing gear is fixed and included a tailwheel.

Plans are available for sale to home constructors.

== Specifications ==
Data from Jane's All the World's Aircraft 1988-89

General characteristics

- Crew: 1
- Length: 19 ft 3 in (5.87 m)
- Wingspan: 22 ft 1 1/2 in (6.74 m)
- Height: 5 ft 8 in (1.73 m)
- Wing area: 87.0 sq ft (8.08 m^{2})
- Airfoil: root: NACA 2213.2; tip: NACA 2206
- Empty weight: 805 lb (365 kg)
- Gross weight: 1,100 lb (499 kg)
- Fuel capacity: 10 imp gal (12 US gal; 45 L)
- Powerplant: 1 × Continental O-200 4-cylinder air-cooled horizontally-opposed piston engine, 100 hp (75 kW)
- Propellers: 2-bladed fixed-pitch propeller

Performance

- Maximum speed: 150 mph (240 km/h, 130 kn) at sea level
- Cruise speed: 134 mph (216 km/h, 116 kn)
- Stall speed: 47 mph (76 km/h, 41 kn) (with airbrake extended)
- g limits: +9/-4.5
- Rate of climb: 1,100 ft/min (5.6 m/s)

== See also ==
- Isaacs Fury

Aircraft of comparable role, configuration, and era

- Jurca Spit
- Sindlinger Hawker Hurricane
- Supermarine Aircraft Spitfire
