= Jurca Pee-40 =

French fighter aircraft replica and sports plane

MJ-12 Pee-40

General information
- Type: Replica warbird
- National origin: France
- Manufacturer: Homebuilt
- Designer: Marcel Jurca

The Jurca MJ-12 Pee-40 is a sport aircraft designed in France as a 3/4-scale replica of the Curtiss P-40 and marketed for homebuilding. It is one of many wooden homebuilt designs from Romanian born designer Marcel Jurca. Jurca was a Henschel Hs 129 pilot in World War II who started designing aircraft after building a Jodel The builder may also choose to build the fuselage structure from welded steel tube.

== Specifications (typical) ==
General characteristics

- Crew: One pilot
- Length: 7.62 m (25 ft 0 in)
- Wingspan: 8.52 m (28 ft 0 in)
- Wing area: 13.0 m^{2} (140 sq ft)
- Empty weight: 1,000 kg (2,200 lb)
- Gross weight: 1,300 kg (2,860 lb)
- Powerplant: 1 × various aviation or automotive engines , 150–300 kW (200–400 hp)

Performance

- Maximum speed: 440 km/h (275 mph, 239 kn)
- Range: 900 km (560 mi, 490 nmi)
- Rate of climb: 10.2 m/s (2,000 ft/min)
