= Jurca Tempête =

MJ-2 Tempete
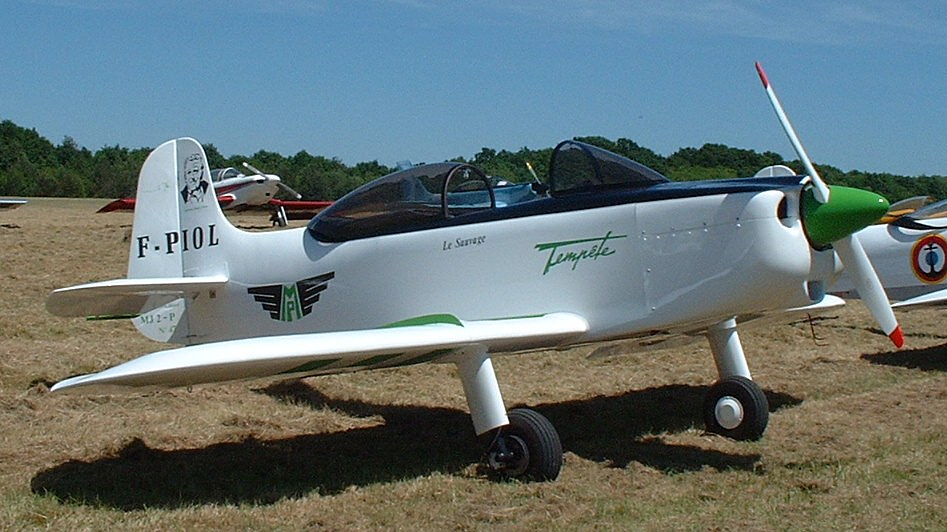

General information
- Type: Sport aircraft
- National origin: France
- Manufacturer: Homebuilt
- Designer: Marcel Jurca
- Number built: >60

History
- First flight: 27 June 1956

The Jurca MJ-2 Tempete (French: "Tempest") is a single-seat sport aircraft designed in France in the mid 1950s and marketed for homebuilding.

== Development ==
The Tempete is a low-wing cantilever monoplane of conventional configuration and utilising wooden construction throughout apart from the fabric covering of the flying surfaces. The undercarriage is of the fixed, tailwheel or tailskid type. The pilot's seat is enclosed by a bubble canopy; some aircraft have a second seat to carry a passenger of less than 55 kg (121 lb).

The Tempête may be powered by a wide range of engines. At least 13 possibilities have been listed, each with its own suffix letter. These engines are all either Continental or Lycoming horizontally opposed types in the power range 48.5 - 134 kW (60-180 hp). The French and UK civil registers contain examples with seven different engines, the most popular choice being the 67 kW (90 hp) Continental C90 fitted to the Tempête MJ-2D model.

The Jurca MJ-3 Dart was a one-off sport aircraft which was constructed in the United States in 1977. It was built by Denis Jacobs of Dayton, Ohio, marrying the fuselage of the single-seat Jurca Tempête with the wings of the two seat Jurca Sirocco. The Jurca Shadow was a variant with larger, swept back tail surfaces.

== Operational history ==
The Tempête has been flown since 1957 by private owner and sporting pilots. There have been 37 on the French register, though 4 of these have been withdrawn as of September 2010. Two Tempêtes have UK Permits to Fly in 2010. In 2000 there were several flying in the USA.

Marcel Jurca died 19 October 2001 but plans are still available in 2009 from the designer's web site.

== Variants ==
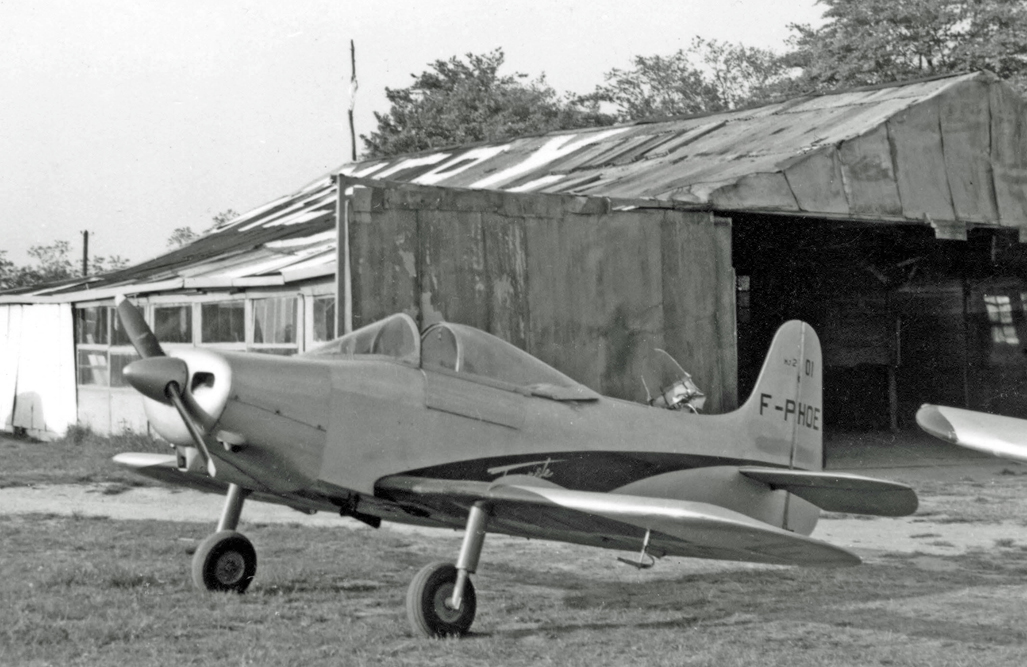
The prototype MJ-2 Tempete No.01 at Mery-sur-Oise airfield near Paris in May 1957

- MJ-2
  - MJ-20 (never built)
  - MJ-22 - Strengthened version with a 112 kW (150 hp) engine
  - MJ-23 Orage ("Thunderstorm") - high-performance version with trapezoidal wings and intended for a 300-hp engine (never built)
- MJ-3 Dart - MJ-2 modified (1 built)
- MJ-4 Shadow - Version with enlarged, swept empennage (2 built)

== Specifications (MJ-2A) ==
Data from Jane's All the World's Aircraft 1984, pp. 535-6

General characteristics

- Crew: One pilot
- Length: 5.85 m (19 ft 2 in)
- Wingspan: 6.00 m (19 ft 8 in)
- Height: 2.40 m (7 ft 10 in)
- Wing area: 7.98 m^{2} (85.9 sq ft)
- Empty weight: 290 kg (639 lb)
- Gross weight: 430 kg (950 lb)
- Powerplant: 1 × Continental A-65-8 , 48.5 kW (75 hp)

Performance

- Maximum speed: 193 km/h (120 mph, 100 kn)
- Cruise speed: 65 km/h (102 mph, 89 kn)
- Service ceiling: 3,500 m (11,500 ft)
- Rate of climb: 2.8 m/s (555 ft/min) at sea level

== Other reading ==
- Taylor, Michael J. H. (1989). Jane's Encyclopedia of Aviation. London: Studio Editions. p. 547.
- Jane's All the World's Aircraft 1987-88. London: Jane's Publishing Company. p. 577.
