= Jurca MJ-53 Autan =

French homebuilt light touring aircraft

MJ-53 Autan

General information
- Type: Homebuilt 2-seat touring aircraft
- National origin: France
- Designer: Marcel Jurca
- Number built: 2

History
- First flight: 1992

The Jurca MJ-53 Autan (named after a wind in Southern France) is a plans-built, low-wing, touring monoplane designed in France by Marcel Jurca.

== Development ==
Jurca was initially reluctant to design a side-by-side configuration aircraft as he preferred single-seat or tandem-seat 'fighters', but he was convinced to do it by friends and potential customers.

The Autan is a development of the wooden-construction Jurca MJ-5 Sirocco, with a new trapezoidal wing based on the Jurca MJ-7 Gnatsum, but with flaps. The fuselage is redesigned to accommodate a wider cabin, and the result is a shoulder width of 118 cm (3.87 ft), unusually spacious for this class of aircraft. The basic design is for a fixed undercarriage, but it allows for electrically or hydraulically powered retractable gear. For reasons of weight, aerobatics are preferably done only with the fixed gear.

Two prototypes have been built, both with electrically powered retractable landing gear, and with Lycoming O-360 180 hp (134 kW) engines. They made their first flights in 1992.

In 1998 Jurca started studying a four-seat development, the MJ-58, but he was busy with developing the Jurca MJ-70 Gnatsum, and nothing came of it.

== Specifications (MJ-53 Autan) ==
Data from Avions Marcel Jurca

General characteristics

- Crew: one
- Capacity: one passenger
- Length: 6.7 m (22 ft 0 in)
- Wingspan: 7.6 m (24 ft 11 in)
- Width: 1.18 m (3 ft 10 in)
- Wing area: 12.21 m^{2} (131.4 sq ft)
- Empty weight: 690 kg (1,521 lb)
- Gross weight: 960 kg (2,116 lb)
- Fuel capacity: 240 litres (53 imp gal; 63 US gal)
- Powerplant: 1 × Lycoming O-360 , 120 to 150 kW (160 to 200 hp)
- Propellers: 2-bladed

Performance

- Cruise speed: 240 km/h (150 mph, 130 kn)
- Stall speed: 100 km/h (62 mph, 54 kn)
- Never exceed speed: 350 km/h (220 mph, 190 kn)
- Range: 1,400 km (870 mi, 760 nmi)
- g limits: +6/-4
- Rate of climb: 6.1 m/s (1,200 ft/min)
- Wing loading: 79 kg/m^{2} (16 lb/sq ft)
