= Jurca MJ-54 Silas =

French light transport aircraft

MJ-54 Silas

General information
- Type: Light cargo aircraft
- National origin: France
- Designer: Marcel Jurca
- Built by: Association Tegas
- Status: Abandoned
- Number built: 1

History
- First flight: 30 April 1997

The Jurca MJ-54 Silas is a two-seat light touring cargo aircraft designed by Marcel Jurca to enable a small car to be transported along with the pilot and passenger. (Note: Unusually for Jurca, the name 'Silas' does not refer to a wind. It may be a reversal of the surname of Jean-Baptiste Salis, the leading light of La Ferté-Alais airfield where the aircraft was built.)

== Origins ==
The aircraft came from an idea by Arthur-Joseph Torossian in 1992, who wanted a touring aircraft which could carry a very small vehicle, such as the Aixam Microcar, for use at remote airfields, and which could also be used as sleeping accommodation with the car removed. The car could also act as an aircraft tug at airports. He envisioned it as a combination of a Max Holste Broussard and a Transall C.160. He saw many other uses for the aircraft, including as an air ambulance, carrier for four parachutists, disabled persons carrier, or freighter. Torossian envisaged a market for 1000 aircraft, and during the development of the prototype was looking for a company to mass-produce it. In 2000 he was awarded the French Union of Inventors' prize for the best invention.

== Development ==
The well-known designer of wooden homebuilt aircraft, Marcel Jurca was enlisted to design the prototype. Construction was started at Cerny Aerodrome, La Ferté-Alais by Torossian and a group of friends, who together formed a group known as the Association Tegas, a reversal of the surname of Dassault test pilot Jean-Marie Saget. This led to the aircraft sometimes mistakenly being called "The Tegas". The aircraft, registered F-WGBT and nicknamed "Cargolito", first flew on 30 April 1997, but this may have just consisted of a few hops along the runway. Development was slow, and a public presentation was not held until 16 January 2002 at La Ferté-Alais. Apparently, obtaining a permit to fly was difficult because of the fuel in the car's tank. Joseph Torossian had great problems getting finance for production. A planned promotional tour of French flying clubs seems not to have taken place, and little happened since. The prototype remains stored at the airfield.

== Design ==
The MJ-54 is a high-wing monoplane of wooden construction, with two seats accessed by two gull-wing doors. The cockpit was designed with touring comfort in mind. The fuselage is a box structure with a rear loading ramp up which a small car can be driven, or other freight loaded. The centre of gravity changes little, whether loaded or unloaded. It has a cantilever wing. The horizontal tailplane is attached to the underside of a rear boom, with twin fins and rudders on the tips. It has a fixed tricycle undercarriage.

== Specifications (MJ-54) ==
Data from Tegas.net (on Wayback Machine)

General characteristics

- Crew: one pilot
- Capacity: one passenger
- Length: 9 m (29 ft 6 in)
- Wingspan: 12 m (39 ft 4 in)
- Empty weight: 1,410 kg (3,109 lb)
- Gross weight: 1,750 kg (3,858 lb)
- Powerplant: 1 × Lycoming , 190 kW (250 hp)
- Propellers: 2-bladed

Performance

- Cruise speed: 190 km/h (120 mph, 100 kn)
- Range: 750 km (470 mi, 400 nmi)
