= Jurca MJ-51 Sperocco =

French homebuilt light aircraft

MJ-51 Sperocco

General information
- Type: Low-wing 2-seat aerobatic aircraft
- National origin: France
- Designer: Marcel Jurca
- Number built: 3

History
- First flight: 6 June 2019
- Developed from: Jurca MJ-5 Sirocco

The Jurca MJ-51 Sperocco (Special Sirocco) is a plans-built two-seat tandem aerobatic aircraft derived from the Jurca MJ-5 Sirocco.

== Design and development ==
Encouraged by friends and previous customers, Marcel Jurca developed the MJ-51 in 1969 as an improved, higher power Sirocco. It has a longer, more rounded, stronger fuselage capable of engines up to 360 hp (268 kW) and the wings of the MJ-7 Gnatsum without dihedral. Other changes include a raised rear seat, a longer canopy and a smaller tail. Jurca said that it was his favourite two-seat design.

There are two variants - the MJ-51B for engines of 200 hp (149 kW), and the MJ-51C for engines from 260 hp (194 kW) up to 300 hp (224 kW).

Three examples have been started, each varying from the basic design in collaboration with Jurca himself. Construction of the first prototype started in France in around 1981. It was to be powered by a 200 hp (149 kW) Lycoming AEIO-360. The builder died in 2004 and the project remains incomplete.

The second example was started in the USA in 1991. It has a 260 hp (194 kW) Lycoming IO-540 engine, uprated to 285 hp (213 kW) and made its first flight on 6 June 2019. In 2021, the aircraft, registered N3LM, won the Homebuilt Plansbuilt Grand Champion Gold Lindy at EAA AirVenture Oshkosh.

The third aircraft was started in France in 1999 with a plan to install a Potez 260 hp (194 kW) engine. Transferred to a different builder, the design has been changed and strengthened to accommodate a 300 hp (224 kW) Lycoming AEIO-540 Other modifications will include a two-door canopy, a larger and more accessible rear seat, additional fuel tanks, advanced avionics and uprated brakes. The aircraft has yet to fly (October 2019).

== Specifications (MJ-51) ==
Data from Avions Marcel Jurca

General characteristics

- Crew: one
- Capacity: one passenger
- Length: 7.2 to 7.5 m (23 ft 7 in to 24 ft 7 in)
- Wingspan: 7.6 to 8.3 m (24 ft 11 in to 27 ft 3 in)
- Wing area: 10.3 to 11 m^{2} (111 to 118 sq ft)
- Airfoil: Habib 64000 748 (NACA 747A415 eq)
- Empty weight: 800 to 850 kg (1,764 to 1,874 lb)
- Gross weight: 1,100 kg (2,425 lb)
- Fuel capacity: 80 to 130
- Powerplant: 1 × Lycoming O-360 or Lycoming O-540 , 150 to 220 kW (200 to 300 hp) at 2,750 rpm
- Propellers: 2-bladed

Performance

- Maximum speed: 300 to 380 km/h (190 to 240 mph, 160 to 210 kn)
- Cruise speed: 260 to 350 km/h (160 to 220 mph, 140 to 190 kn) at 75% power
- Stall speed: 90 to 95 km/h (56 to 59 mph, 49 to 51 kn) with flaps
- Never exceed speed: 400 to 450 km/h (250 to 280 mph, 220 to 240 kn)
- Range: 800 to 1,000 km (500 to 620 mi, 430 to 540 nmi)
- g limits: +8/-8
- Rate of climb: 10 to 15 m/s (2,000 to 3,000 ft/min)
