= Jurca Fourtouna =

MJ-14 Fourtouna

General information
- Type: Racing aircraft
- National origin: France
- Manufacturer: Homebuilt
- Designer: Marcel Jurca

The Jurca MJ-14 Fourtouna (English: Tempest) was a racing aircraft designed by Marcel Jurca in France in the late 1970s. It was an unconventional, low-wing cantilever monoplane with retractable tailwheel undercarriage. The fuselage had a low profile that required the pilot to sit in a reclined position. The vertical stabiliser was very small, but aft of the cockpit, the fuselage changed shape from being low and broad to being high and narrow. None have been completed.

== Specifications (as designed) ==
General characteristics

- Crew: One pilot
- Length: 5.68 m (18 ft 8 in)
- Wingspan: 6.00 m (19 ft 9 in)
- Empty weight: 250 kg (550 lb)
- Gross weight: 420 kg (925 lb)
- Powerplant: 1 × Continental C90 , 67 kW (90 hp)
