= Jurca 1-Nine-0 =

MJ-8 1-Nine-0
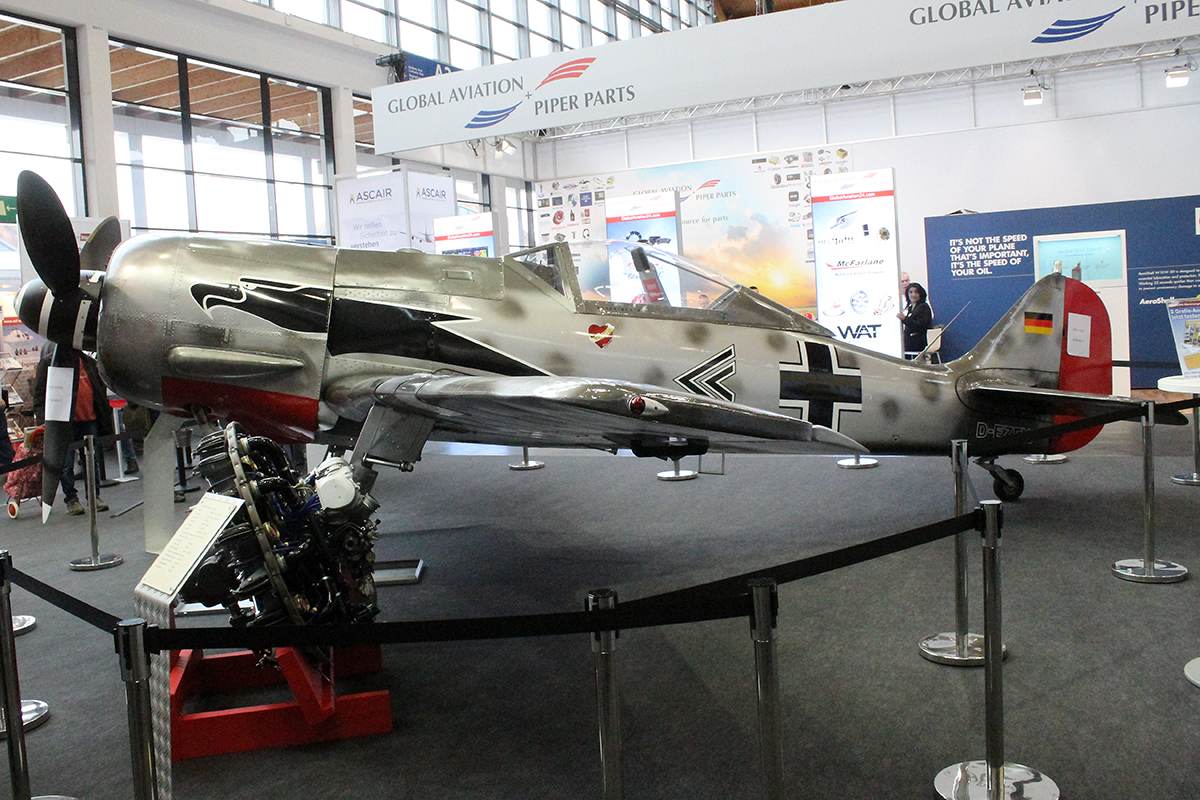

General information
- Type: Replica warbird
- National origin: France
- Manufacturer: Homebuilt
- Designer: Marcel Jurca

History
- First flight: 30 March 1975

The Jurca MJ-8 1-Nine-0 is a sport aircraft designed in France in the mid 1970s as a replica of the Focke-Wulf Fw 190 and marketed for homebuilding. It is one of many wooden homebuilt designs from Romanian born designer Marcel Jurca. Jurca was a Henschel Hs 129 pilot in World War II who started designing aircraft after building a Jodel. Plans for two versions were produced, the MJ-8, at 3/4 scale, and the MJ-80, at full-scale. Construction throughout is of wood, and the builder may choose to complete the aircraft with either a single seat or two seats in tandem. The plans were marketed by Falconar and later Jurca Plans West.

At least two MJ-8s have flown: one powered by a Lycoming IO-540 in the USA and one powered by a Russian M14P radial built in Switzerland but now in New Zealand.

As of July 2017 one MJ-80 is known to have flown, a Pratt & Whitney R-1830-powered example in Germany.

== Variants ==
- MJ-8 - 3/4 scale version
  - MJ-80 - full-scale version. Powered with a 310 hp Continental GIO-470 or equivalent.

== Specifications (typical MJ-8) ==
Data from Air Trails

General characteristics

- Crew: One pilot
- Length: 6.63 m (21 ft 9 in)
- Wingspan: 7.87 m (25 ft 10 in)
- Wing area: 10.2 m^{2} (110 sq ft)
- Empty weight: 400 kg (880 lb)
- Gross weight: 626 kg (1,380 lb)
- Powerplant: 1 × various radial or horizontally-opposed engines , 120 kW (160 hp)

Performance

- Maximum speed: 260 km/h (160 mph, 140 kn)
- Rate of climb: 8.4 m/s (1,650 ft/min)

== See also ==
Aircraft of comparable role, configuration, and era

- Jurca Gnatsum
