= Wing Derringer =

Type of aircraft

D-1 Derringer
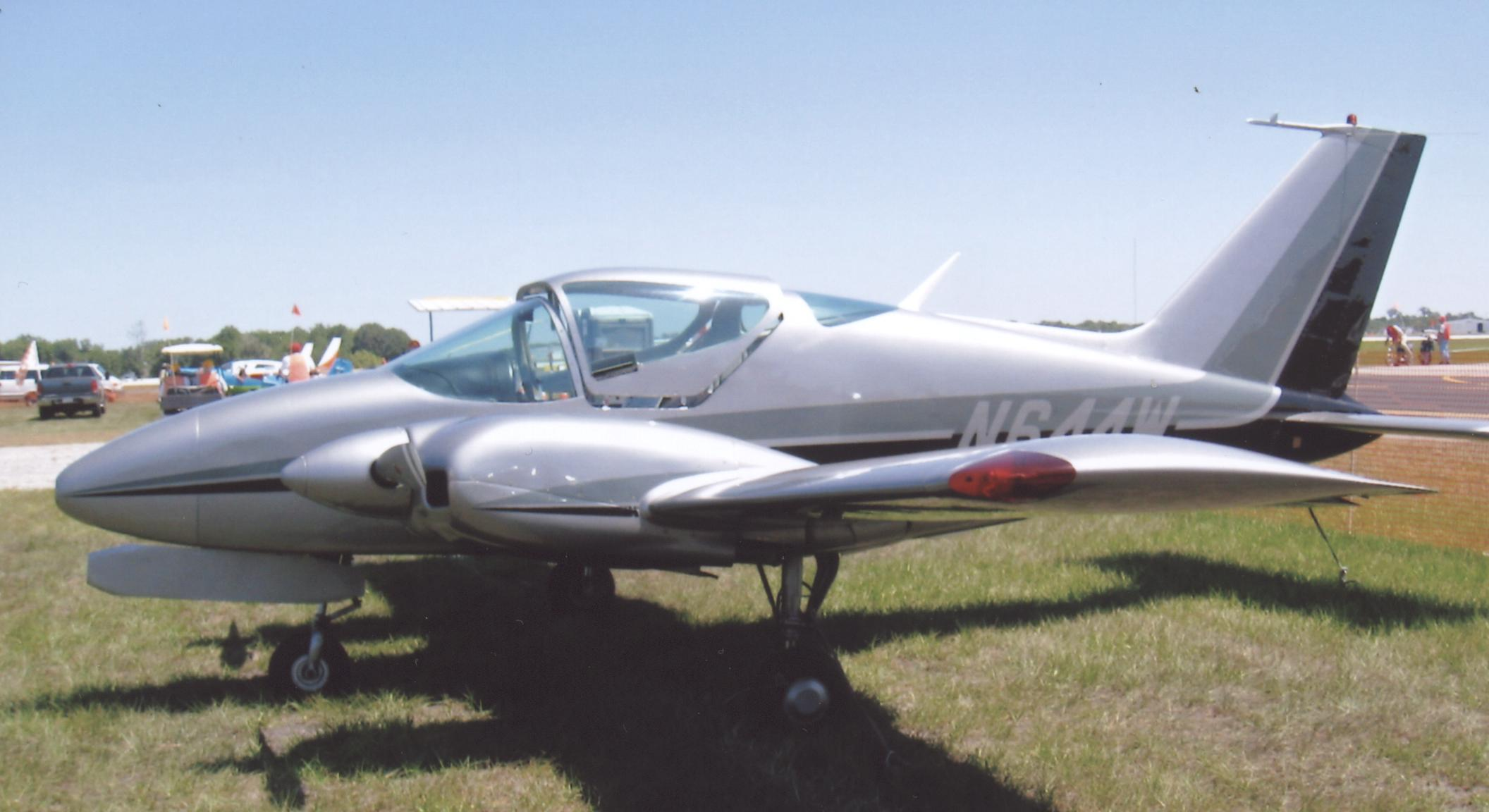
- Wing D-1 Derringer at Lakeland, Florida in April 2009

General information
- Type: Light twin-engined touring monoplane
- National origin: United States
- Manufacturer: Wing Aircraft
- Designer: John Thorp
- Number built: 12

History
- First flight: 1 May 1962

The Wing D-1 Derringer is an American light twin-engined two-seat monoplane tourer designed by John Thorp and developed by the Hi-Shear Corporation and built by the Wing Aircraft Company.

== Development ==
The D-1 Derringer light twin design was originally designed in 1958 by John Thorp as the Thorp T-17 a twin-engined development of his Thorp T-11 Sky Scooter. The design was taken over by George Wing of the Hi-Shear Corporation. The Derringer is a low-wing cantilever monoplane with a retractable tricycle landing gear. It had room for two in an enclosed cockpit with an unusual up and backward opening canopy. It was powered by two 100 hp Continental O-200 engines, one mounted on the leading edge of each wing. The prototype aircraft (registered N3621G) first flew on May 1, 1962 at Torrance.

A second prototype flew in November 1964 but crashed a few weeks later due to an in-flight airframe failure. A static test aircraft and two more aircraft were built for testing which resulted in the award of FAA type certificate A9WE on December 20, 1966. The aircraft did not go into production due to internal problems within the Hi-Shear Corporation.

The Derringer used manufacturing techniques that were considered new at the time it was developed. Butt-joined, flush-riveted, chemically-milled and stretched skins are used throughout the airframe.

Development of a two-seat Coin/military trainer version designated Wing D-2M Derringer was begun but failed to develop further than the design stage.

In 1978 George Wing left Hi-Shear and started the Wing Aircraft Company. The company built one pre-production aircraft followed by six production aircraft and then entered bankruptcy in July 1982, after which only one further aircraft was built before seven unfinished airframes were sold.

As of June 3, 1998, the D-1’s type certificate number A9WE was held by Emerald Enterprises LTD of San Diego, CA.

Nine D-1 aircraft were on the U.S. civil aircraft register in May 2009.

== Specifications (D-1) ==
Data from Jane's All The World's Aircraft 1980-81

General characteristics

- Crew: 2
- Length: 23 ft 0 in (7.01 m)
- Wingspan: 29 ft 2 in (8.89 m)
- Height: 8 ft 0 in (2.44 m)
- Wing area: 121 sq ft (11.2 m^{2})
- Aspect ratio: 7
- Airfoil: NACA 65_{2}-415
- Empty weight: 2,070 lb (939 kg)
- Max takeoff weight: 3,050 lb (1,383 kg)
- Fuel capacity: 88 US gal (330 L; 73 imp gal)
- Powerplant: 2 × Avco Lycoming IO-320-B1C 4-cylinder air-cooled horizontally opposed piston engines, 160 hp (120 kW) each
- Propellers: 2-bladed Hartzell constant speed propellers, 5 ft 6 in (1.68 m) diameter

Performance

- Maximum speed: 201 kn (231 mph, 372 km/h) at sea level
- Cruise speed: 184 kn (212 mph, 341 km/h) at 13,000 ft (4,000 m) (65% power)
- Stall speed: 55 kn (63 mph, 101 km/h) (landing gear and flaps down)
- Range: 1,007 nmi (1,159 mi, 1,865 km) at 10,000 ft (3,000 m) (econ. cruise)
- Service ceiling: 19,600 ft (6,000 m)
- Rate of climb: 1,700 ft/min (8.6 m/s)

== See also ==
Aircraft of comparable role, configuration, and era

- Jurca MJ-6
