= Piel CP-40 Donald =

1950s French light aircraft

CP-40 Donald

General information
- Type: Single seat sports homebuilt aircraft
- National origin: France
- Designer: Claude Piel
- Number built: 3

History
- First flight: 16 June 1953

The Piel CP-40 Donald is a French homebuilt, single engine, single seat, high wing aircraft. It was first flown in the early 1950s, though the last of the three examples completed did not fly until almost forty years later.

== Design and development ==
The Donald is a conventionally laid-out single engine, braced high wing monoplane. Its low aspect ratio (5.1) wings are unswept and of constant chord, with blunt, rounded tips; they carry short, broad ailerons but no flaps. There are V-form struts between the wing and lower fuselage on each side. At the rear the vertical surfaces are rounded and the balanced rudder extends down to the keel. The horizontal tail is tapered with rounded tips and the elevators have a cut-out for rudder movement.

Behind the engine the fuselage is flat sided. The pilot's windscreen is just ahead of the wing leading edge but the side glazing of the single-seat cabin extends back to about two-thirds chord. The cabin roof extends into raised rear fuselage decking, which drops away slowly to the tail. The Donald has a tailskid undercarriage with main wheels mounted on split axles, hinged on a shallow V-strut attached to the fuselage underside. Faired, tapered legs are mounted on the lower fuselage longerons.

The first prototype, with only 19 kW (25 hp) from its Volkswagen 1.1-litre air-cooled flat-four engine, first flew on 16 June 1953. Two other Donalds were homebuilt from plans by different amateurs. These were chiefly distinguished by the choice of air-cooled flat-four engine, most of which were Volkswagen based. Engine details, dates and type numbers are given below. The last built, the CP-402 no.9 F-PRAK, was still on the French civil register in 2014, having moved to Angers in 2005.

== Variants ==
Data from Massé (2004) and Gaillard (1990)

CP-40
First prototype with 19 kW (25 hp) Volkswagen 1.1-litre air-cooled flat-four engine. First flight 16 June 1953.
CP-41
CP-40 re-engined in 1959 with a 34 kW (45 hp) Percy engine.
CP-401
Second aircraft, with a 48 kW (65 hp) Continental A65 air-cooled flat-four engine. First flight 25 August 1970.
CP-402
CP-401 re-engined in 1977 with a 30 kW (40 hp) Rectimo engine, based on a Volkswagen engine-block.
CP-402 no.9
Third aircraft, with a 34 kW (45 hp) Volkswagen 1.6-litre air-cooled flat-four engine. Wing angle of incidence 4.5°, rather than 2.0°. First flown in 1992.

== Specifications (CP-402 no.9) ==
Data from Massé (2004) pp.29-33

General characteristics

- Crew: One
- Length: 5.00 m (16 ft 5 in)
- Wingspan: 7.20 m (23 ft 7 in)
- Height: 1.80 m (5 ft 11 in)
- Wing area: 10 m^{2} (110 sq ft)
- Empty weight: 210 kg (463 lb)
- Max takeoff weight: 400 kg (882 lb)
- Fuel capacity: 65 L (14 imp gal; 17 US gal)
- Powerplant: 1 × Volkswagen 1.6 L air-cooled flat-four engine, 34 kW (45 hp)
- Propellers: 2-bladed Evra, 1.38 m (4 ft 6 in) diameter wooden, fixed pitch

Performance

- Cruise speed: 135 km/h (84 mph, 73 kn)
- Stall speed: 61 km/h (38 mph, 33 kn)
- Never exceed speed: 190 km/h (120 mph, 100 kn)
- Range: 750 km (470 mi, 400 nmi)
- Service ceiling: 3,000 m (9,800 ft)
- g limits: +3.8/-1.2
