= Currie Wot =

Wot
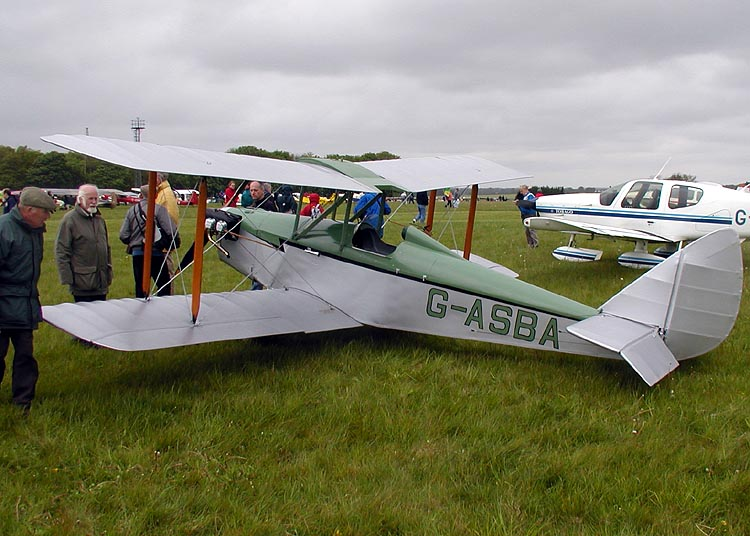

General information
- Type: Single-seat aerobatic
- Manufacturer: Homebuilt
- Designer: J. R. Currie

History
- First flight: 1937
- Variants: Turner Two Seat Wot

The Currie Wot (pronounced as "what") was a 1930s British single-seat aerobatic biplane aircraft. Plans were sold for home building of the aircraft.

== Design and development ==
The Wot was designed by J R (Joe) Currie, and two examples were built by Cinque Ports Aviation Limited at Lympne Aerodrome in 1937. They were both powered by a single 40 hp Aeronca-JAP J-99 two-cylinder engines, but had minor differences in design. They were designated the Wot 1 and Wot 2; the name came about whilst Currie was building the first aircraft and being tired with being asked what he would call it, replied: "Call it Wot you blooming well like". Currie built two aircraft (G-AFCG and G-AFDS), that he offered for sale at £250. Both were destroyed in 1940 during a Second World War German air raid on Lympne.

After the war, at the request of Viv Bellamy, then Chief Flying Instructor at the Hampshire Aeroplane Club (HAC) at Eastleigh, Currie used the same drawings to enable the HAC to build two more examples under the supervision of J O Isaacs. The first aircraft, registered G-APNT, first flew on 11 September 1958. G-APNT was soon re-engined with a four-cylinder 60 hp Walter Mikron II engine and was also trialled using floats. With the more powerful Mikron engine it was known as the Hot Wot and later, with the floats, as the Wet Wot. The floatplane version was not a success and they were soon removed. With the original Aeronca-JAP engine fitted it was delivered on 29 May 1959 as the personal aircraft of Westland Aircraft test pilot H J Penrose, who christened the aeroplane 'Airymouse' and wrote a book of the same name about his experiences flying the aircraft. The second aircraft, registered G-APWT had a number of different engines fitted for trials, including a 60 hp Rover TP60/1 industrial gas turbine engine, before being delivered to Elstree Aerodrome in 1962. G-APWT was later sold to Robert Rust Sr. and relocated to Fayetteville, Georgia in the United States. The aircraft was restored to flying condition and flew again for the first time in 2008 with an original Walter Mikron engine. At the time it carried the registration N67247, but the registration was allowed to lapse in 2013.

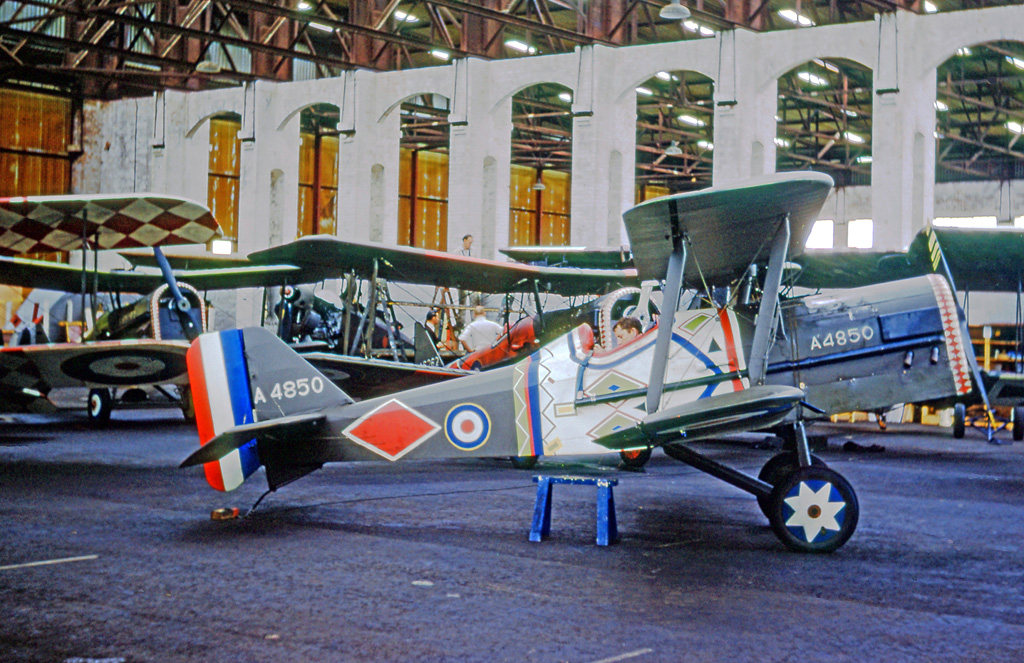
Currie Wot built with modifications to resemble an RAF S.E.5A for use in the film Darling Lili

Aircraft plans were sold to amateur builders and soon examples were being constructed, the first homebuilt aircraft flying in 1963. The aircraft featured all-wood construction with fabric covering. The most unusual Wots were built in 1967 by Slingsby Sailplanes Limited. Slingsby built six aircraft modified to represent the Royal Aircraft Factory S.E.5A for film work. They were powered by 115 hp Lycoming O-235 engines with dummy exhausts and other modifications as 0.83 scale replicas. They were delivered to Ireland and fitted with dummy guns for the film Darling Lili. Some of the aircraft were also used in the films I Shot Down Richthofen, I Think, and Dubious Patriot.

The Currie Super Wot is a clipped-wing variant with X-bracing between the undercarriage V-struts instead of a through axle. Other refinements in the Super Wot include rounding out the fuselage with formers and stringers and doing away with the upper wing centre-section, replacing the cabane struts with inverted V tubular struts in a similar style to the Pitts Special. These refinements result in a faster cruise and enhanced climb rate and a quicker roll rate. A Super Wot fitted with a 90hp Continental will fly a quarter-vertical roll, which is probably outside the capability of the standard Wot. Nick Bloom wrote a series of articles about his Super Wot which appeared in Pilot Magazine under the title 'Diary of a Homebuilder'. His Currie Super Wot is one of only two on the G-register, and has the registration G-BGES.

The design rights for the Currie Wot were first sold to Dr J H B Urmston (trading as Botley Aircraft), who sold the designs to Phoenix Aircraft Limited.

== Specifications (Currie Wot - Walter Mikron III) ==
Data from British civil aircraft, 1919-1972 Volume II

General characteristics

- Crew: 1
- Length: 18 ft 3.5 in (5.575 m)
- Wingspan: 22 ft 1 in (6.73 m)
- Height: 6 ft 9 in (2.06 m)
- Wing area: 140 sq ft (13 m^{2})
- Airfoil: Clark YH
- Empty weight: 550 lb (249 kg)
- Gross weight: 900 lb (408 kg)
- Powerplant: 1 × Walter Mikron III 4-cylinder air-cooled inverted in-line piston engine, 65 hp (48 kW)
- Propellers: 2-bladed fixed-pitch propeller

Performance

- Maximum speed: 95 mph (153 km/h, 83 kn)
- Cruise speed: 80 mph (130 km/h, 70 kn)
- Range: 240 mi (390 km, 210 nmi)
- Rate of climb: 600 ft/min (3.0 m/s)
