= Autan =

Autan أوتان Otan
- Village
- Location in Syria
- Coordinates: 34°49′7″N 36°25′15″E
- Country: Syria
- Governorate: Homs
- District: Homs
- Subdistrict: Qabu

Population (2004)
  - Total: 583
- Time zone: UTC+3 (AST)

Autan (Arabic: أوتان, also spelled Otan, Awtan or Wetan) is a village in northern Syria located northwest of Homs in the Homs Governorate. According to the Syria Central Bureau of Statistics, Autan had a population of 583 in the 2004 census. Its inhabitants are predominantly Maronites.

== Bibliography ==
- Robinson, E.; Smith, E. (1841). Biblical Researches in Palestine, Mount Sinai and Arabia Petraea: A Journal of Travels in the year 1838. Vol. 3. Boston: Crocker & Brewster.
