= Sindlinger Hawker Hurricane =

Hawker Hurricane
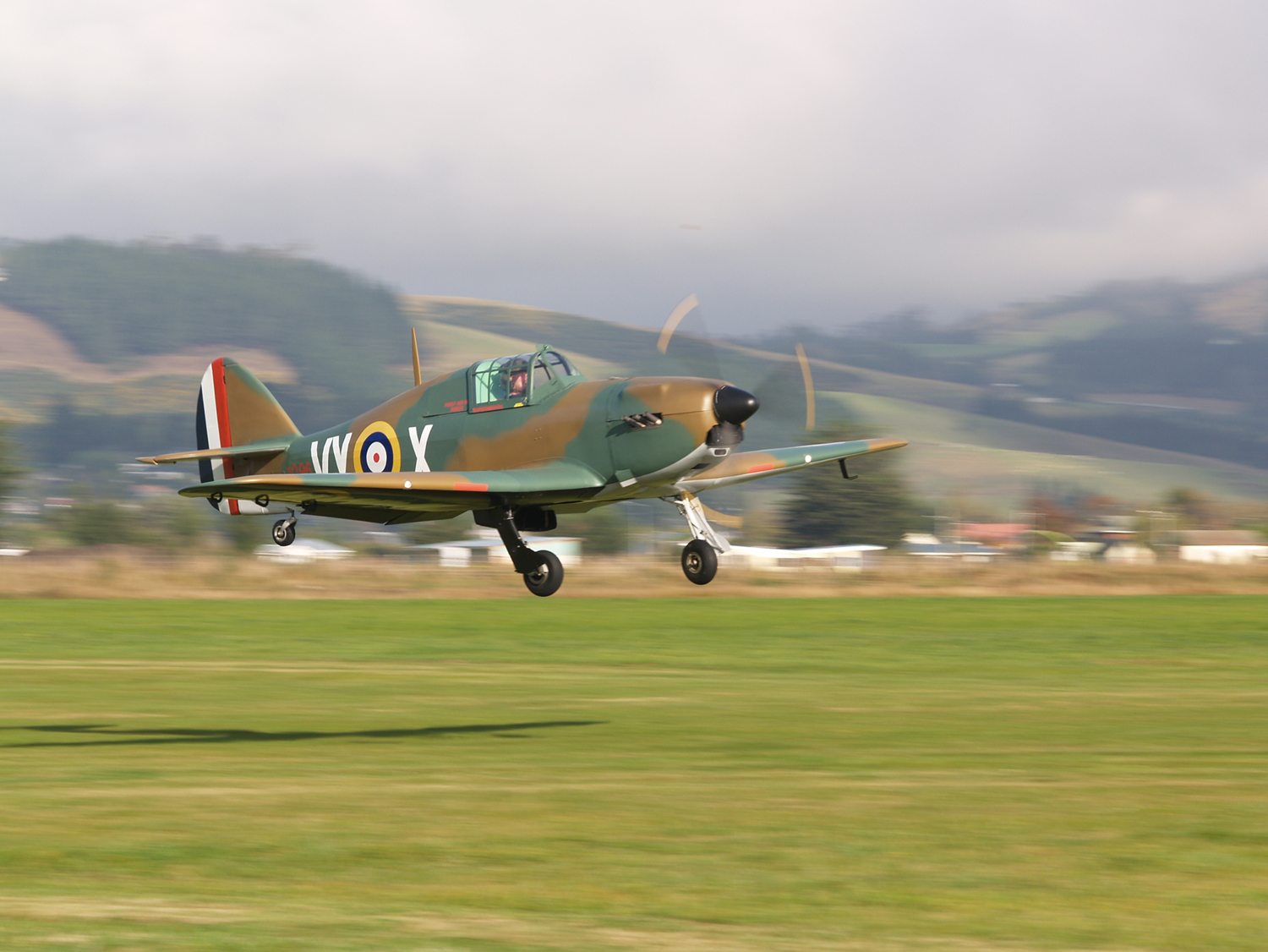

General information
- Type: Homebuilt
- National origin: United States
- Designer: Fred Sindlinger

History
- First flight: January 1972

The Sindlinger HH-1 Hawker Hurricane is a 5/8 scale homebuilt design based on the Hawker Hurricane. Designed by Fred Sindlinger for amateur construction, the prototype was built between 1969 and 1972.

== Design ==
Although based on the Hawker Hurricane the design makes some compromises for the amateur construction and the smaller size. It is an all-wood low-wing cantilever monoplane with a manual retractable main landing gear (the one pictured is electric retractable) and fixed tail wheel. Designed to take a 210 hp (157 kW) Lycoming engine. The cockpit is 4 inches (100 mm) out of scale in height and width and the elevators are 12% overscale. It used wooden stringers and fabric to give the appearance of the real Hurricane.

Although originally designed for the Lycoming O-320 a number of people have successfully fitted auto (car) engines. The picture is of one such conversion in New Zealand which has been successfully flying for 900 hours as of March 2020 using a Mitsubishi 6G74 |Mitsubishi 6G74]] V6 engine driving a Dave Blanton designed kevlar cogged belt Propeller speed reduction unit. The prop is a WarpDrive 3 blade ground adjustable.

== Specifications (Sindlinger prototype) ==
General characteristics

- Crew: 1
- Length: 19 ft 8 in (5.99 m)
- Wingspan: 25 ft 0 in (7.62 m)
- Height: 5 ft 10 in (1.78 m)
- Wing area: 102 sq ft (9.48 m^{2})
- Empty weight: 1,005 lb (456 kg)
- Gross weight: 1,375 lb (624 kg)
- Powerplant: 1 × Lycoming O-320 , 150 hp (112 kW)

Performance

- Maximum speed: 200 mph (322 km/h, 170 kn)
- Cruise speed: 165 mph (266 km/h, 143 kn)
- Rate of climb: 1,200 ft/min (6.1 m/s)
