= Minihawk =

Minihawk or Mini Hawk may refer to:

- Falconar Minihawk, a Canadian amateur-built aircraft design
- Mini-Hawk Tiger-Hawk, an American light aircraft design
