= Falconar Teal =

Teal

General information
- Type: Utility amphibian
- Manufacturer: Homebuilt
- Designer: Chris Falconar

History
- First flight: December 1967

The Falconar Teal was a two-seat homebuilt, amphibious airplane designed by Chris Falconar of Edmonton, Alberta, Canada. From the 1970s to the 1990s plans were sold by Falconar Aviation of Edmonton (downtown municipal airport). A handful were built by amateur aircraft constructors (aka homebuilders) in Canada and the United States. Most were powered by certified Lycoming or Continental engines.

== Design and development ==
The Teal was based on the two- or three-seat AMF Maranda, and was built mostly of wood. It featured strut-braced high wing, with "W" configuration struts running from the wing roots, down to stabilizing floats (which also contained the main wheels), then back up the wings near 70% span; cruciform tail; two pilots seated side by side under the wing; access to the cockpit by side doors; tricycle undercarriage with the main wheels retracting into stabilizing floats only about 25% of the wing span. The nosewheel retracted into the bow and was covered by two conventional (side-hinged) doors. A rarity among flying boats was its engine location in a nacelle, above the wing, with the propeller rotating immediately in front of the windscreen.

== Specifications ==
Data from Jane's All The World's Aircraft 1971–72

General characteristics

- Crew: 1
- Capacity: 1 passenger
- Length: 24 ft 6 in (7.47 m)
- Wingspan: 33 ft 0 in (10.06 m)
- Height: 7 ft 10 in (2.39 m)
- Wing area: 160 sq ft (15 m^{2})
- Aspect ratio: 6.6:1
- Airfoil: NACA 4412 (modified)
- Empty weight: 1,050 lb (476 kg)
- Max takeoff weight: 1,500 lb (680 kg)
- Powerplant: 1 × Lycoming O-320-B2A air-cooled flat four, 160 hp (120 kW)

Performance

- Maximum speed: 130 mph (210 km/h, 110 kn)
- Cruise speed: 125 mph (201 km/h, 109 kn) (max cruise)
- Stall speed: 37 mph (60 km/h, 32 kn)
- Never exceed speed: 185 mph (298 km/h, 161 kn)
- Range: 450 mi (720 km, 390 nmi) standard fuel
- Ferry range: 700 mi (1,100 km, 610 nmi)
- Service ceiling: 16,400 ft (5,000 m)
- Rate of climb: 1,100 ft/min (5.6 m/s)
