= Mirando =

Mirando may refer to:

Places

- Mirando City, Texas, census-designated place (CDP) in Webb County, Texas, United States

People

- Joseph Mirando (1931–2020), French professional racing cyclist
- Mirando Mrsić (born 1959), Croatian physician, politician and a Minister of Labour and Pension System
- Mirando Rodríguez (boxer) (born 1974), Brazilian boxer

Music

- Mirando (song) from the third studio album by Ratatat released in 2008

== See also ==
- Mirando de lado, debut studio album by Mexican group Kinky
- Maranda (disambiguation)
- Meranda
- Miranda (disambiguation)
- Morondo
- Murindó
