= Golden Hawk =

Golden Hawk may refer to:

- Falconar Golden Hawk, Canadian ultralight aircraft
- MV Golden Hawk, 2015 built bulk carrier
- Studebaker Golden Hawk
