= Adam RA-15 Major =

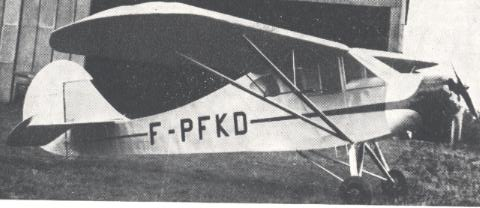
- Adam RA-15 Major in 1957

General information
- Type: light sporting high-wing cabin monoplane
- National origin: France
- Manufacturer: Ets. Roger Adam
- Designer: Roger Adam
- Status: Rights sold to Maranda Aircraft Company in 1957
- Primary user: private owners and aero clubs

History
- Introduction date: 1948
- First flight: 1948
- Developed from: Adam RA-14 Loisirs

The Adam RA-15 Major was a French sporting plane developed and produced in the decade after World War II.

== Development ==
The RA-15 was developed in 1948 as a higher-powered successor to the Adam RA-14 Loisirs, utilising a number of refinements including a plywood-covered fuselage and an enlarged rudder. It was a side-by-side two-seater with dual controls, wooden construction and a fabric-covered two-spar wing which folded for storage in hangars. The Major was designed to use any flat-four engine in the 65-75 h.p. range.

== Production and operational history ==
A small series of Majors was produced in the late 1940s and early 1950s. The basic RA-15 was fitted with the 75 h.p. Regnier 4D-2 engine and the RA-151 had the 75 hp Continental C75 engine. Two Majors were still active in 1965.

== Variants ==
RA-15 Major
RA-17
a modified single seat crop dusting variant of the RA-15.
Maranda BM3
Canadian production of the RA-17 by the Maranda Aircraft Company

== Specification (RA-15) ==
Data from

General characteristics

- Crew: 2
- Length: 22 ft 11 in (6.99 m)
- Wingspan: 34 ft 9 in (10.59 m)
- Height: 7 ft 2 in (2.18 m)
- Empty weight: 616 lb (279 kg)
- Gross weight: 1,145 lb (519 kg)
- Powerplant: 1 × Regnier 4D-2 four cylinder air-cooled engine , 75 hp (56 kW)

Performance

- Maximum speed: 111 mph (178 km/h, 96 kn)
- Cruise speed: 103 mph (165 km/h, 90 kn)
- Range: 340 mi (547 km, 300 nmi)
