= Maranda =

Maranda may refer to:

- A city in the video game Final Fantasy VI
- Maranda, India
- Maranda, Zimbabwe
- Falconar AMF-14H Maranda, Canadian amateur-built aircraft
- Falconar AMF-S14 Super Maranda, Canadian amateur-built aircraft

== People with the surname ==
- Kazimierz Maranda (born 1947), Polish middle-distance runner

== See also ==
- Miranda (disambiguation)
