= Falconar SAL Mustang =

Canadian homebuilt light aircraft

SAL Mustang

General information
- Type: Amateur-built aircraft
- National origin: Canada
- Manufacturer: Falconar Avia; Manna Aviation
- Status: In production (2019)
- Number built: 18 (2012)

History
- Introduction date: 1969
- Developed from: Jurca Gnatsum

The Falconar SAL Mustang, also called the 2/3 Mustang and the SAL P-51D Mustang is a Canadian amateur-built aircraft, originally produced by Falconar Avia and introduced in 1969. The aircraft is a 2/3 scale replica of the North American P-51 Mustang and is supplied as a kit or as plans for amateur construction.

Since the winding up of business by Falconar Avia in 2019, the plans are now sold by Manna Aviation.

== Design and development ==
In 1963 Falconar partnered with designer Marcel Jurca to produce the Jurca Gnatsum. By 1967, Falconar recommended a large number of changes to the design, which resulted in Jurca leaving the project. The modified aircraft was developed as the SAL Mustang and first flown in 1971 after significant cost overruns. Falconar Aircraft Ltd was sold to George F. Chivers and other investors, and operated as Sturgeon Air Ltd (SAL) with Falconar as an employee until 1973.

The SAL Mustang features a cantilever low-wing, a single-seat, or optionally a two-seats-in-tandem, enclosed cockpit under a bubble canopy, retractable conventional landing gear, including a manually retractable tailwheel and a single engine in tractor configuration.

The aircraft is made from wood covered with fibreglass cloth and doped aircraft fabric. Some parts, like the belly air scoop are made from fibreglass. Its 24.8 ft (7.6 m) span wing has an area of 110 sq ft (10 m^{2}) and mounts flaps that may be electrically or manually operated. The cockpit is 24 in (61 cm) wide and the bubble canopy is jettisonable. The aircraft's recommended engine power range is 200 to 350 hp (149 to 261 kW). Engines that have been used include the 200 hp (149 kW) Lycoming IO-360 horizontally opposed engine, the 200 hp (149 kW) Ranger L-440 inverted inline, the 180 to 235 hp (134 to 175 kW) Avia M 337 inverted inline, 230 hp (172 kW) Continental O-470 horizontally opposed, the 200 hp (149 kW) Ford 230 cu in (3.77 L) V6 automotive conversion, as well as other automotive V-6 or V-8 powerplants. Construction time from the supplied kit is estimated as 2500 hours.

The paper plans supplied total an area of 450 sq ft (42 m^{2}), weigh 13 lb (5.9 kg) and include a construction manual. An alternative set of plans allows constructing a tandem two-seat version. The plans are very detailed and complete and one builder rated them as "the best I have seen on any homebuilt airplane".

== Operational history ==
The prototype was introduced at the 1971 EAA airshow painted in the same gold and red colors as the Canadian Golden Hawks airshow team.

In July 2012 the manufacturer indicated that 18 examples had been completed and flown in the 43 years that the plans and kits had been available.

== Specifications (SAL Mustang) ==
Data from Kitplanes and Purdy

General characteristics

- Crew: one
- Length: 22 ft 6 in (6.86 m)
- Wingspan: 24 ft 10 in (7.57 m)
- Wing area: 110 sq ft (10 m^{2})
- Empty weight: 1,420 lb (644 kg)
- Gross weight: 2,180 lb (989 kg)
- Fuel capacity: 36 U.S. gallons (140 L; 30 imp gal)
- Powerplant: 1 × Ranger L-440 inline six cylinder, air-cooled, four stroke aircraft engine, 200 hp (150 kW)
- Propellers: 3-bladed composite

Performance

- Maximum speed: 185 mph (298 km/h, 161 kn)
- Cruise speed: 176 mph (283 km/h, 153 kn)
- Stall speed: 60 mph (97 km/h, 52 kn)
- Never exceed speed: 258 mph (415 km/h, 224 kn)
- Range: 502 mi (808 km, 436 nmi)
- Rate of climb: 1,850 ft/min (9.4 m/s)
- Wing loading: 19.8 lb/sq ft (97 kg/m^{2})
