= Falconar F9A =

Canadian homebuilt aircraft

F9A & F10A

General information
- Type: Amateur-built aircraft
- National origin: Canada
- Manufacturer: Falconar Avia; Manna Aviation
- Designer: Chris Falconar
- Status: Plans available (2019)
- Number built: 30 (1998)

History
- Introduction date: 1965
- Developed from: Jodel D9

The Falconar F9A and F10A are a family of Canadian amateur-built aircraft, that were designed by Chris Falconar and produced by Falconar Avia. The F9A design was introduced in 1965 and both the F9A and F10A were supplied as kits or as plans for amateur construction by Falconar. The F9A and F10A are now available in the form of plans from Manna Aviation.

== Design and development ==
The F9 is a variant of the Jodel D9. Falconar indicated that it incorporates a larger cockpit, simplified fittings, shoulder harnesses and aerodynamic improvements to improve stall characteristics.

Hans Teijgeler of Jodel.com says that the F9A varies from the D9 by using a new wing design, with new simplified spar and rib design and the dihedral point moved inboard, allowing the outer portion to fold for ground transport or storage, but at the cost of added weight. He describes the wing as "less efficient". Teijgeler says of the Falconar F9A, "the Falconar 'Jodel' should not be looked upon as a Jodel, but as a Falconar. This is [n]either good or bad. Just a fact to take into account"

The F9A features a cantilever low-wing, a single seat enclosed cockpit that is 21 in (53 cm) wide, fixed conventional landing gear and a single engine in tractor configuration.

The F9A and F10A are made from wood, with the flying surfaces covered in doped aircraft fabric. Its 23 ft (7.0 m) span wing has an area of 99 sq ft (9.2 m^{2}). Construction time from the supplied kit is estimated as 700 hours.

== Operational history ==
By November 2012, one F9A had been registered with Transport Canada, one F10A in the United States with the Federal Aviation Administration and none with the CAA in the United Kingdom.

== Variants ==
F9
36 hp (27 kW) Volkswagen air-cooled engine
F9A
Initial model with an empty weight of 360 lb (163 kg) and a gross weight of 600 lb (272 kg). The aircraft's recommended engine power range is 30 to 75 hp (22 to 56 kW) and engines that have been used include the 60 hp (45 kW) Volkswagen air-cooled engine and Hirth two-stroke powerplants.
F10A
Strengthened model to allow the installation of larger engines, with an empty weight of 550 lb (249 kg) and a gross weight of 875 lb (397 kg). The aircraft's recommended engine power range is 40 to 100 hp (30 to 75 kW). The fuselage is lengthened 14 in (36 cm) from the F9A and stressed to 9g.

== Specifications (F9A) ==
Data from Purdy

General characteristics

- Crew: one
- Length: 17.90 ft (5.46 m)
- Wingspan: 23.00 ft (7.01 m)
- Wing area: 99.00 sq ft (9.197 m^{2})
- Empty weight: 405 lb (184 kg)
- Gross weight: 660 lb (299 kg)
- Fuel capacity: 10 U.S. gallons (38 L; 8.3 imp gal)
- Powerplant: 1 × Volkswagen air-cooled engine four cylinder, air-cooled, four stroke automotive conversion, 100 hp (75 kW)
- Propellers: 3-bladed ground adjustable wooden

Performance

- Maximum speed: 140 mph (230 km/h, 120 kn)
- Cruise speed: 100 mph (160 km/h, 87 kn)
- Stall speed: 38 mph (61 km/h, 33 kn)
- Range: 300 mi (480 km, 260 nmi)
- Rate of climb: 1,020 ft/min (5.2 m/s)
- Wing loading: 6.7 lb/sq ft (33 kg/m^{2})
