= Manna Aviation =

Australian aircraft parts and plans provider

- Company type: Privately held company
- Industry: Aerospace
- Founded: February 2012
- Headquarters: Toronto, New South Wales, Australia
- Key people: Phil Hale
- Products: Homebuilt aircraft
- Number of employees: four
- Website: mannaaviation.com

Manna Aviation is an Australian aircraft manufacturer based in Toronto, New South Wales, founded by Phil Hale. The company specializes in provision of parts and plans for amateur construction.

The company focuses on plans for wooden aircraft, with the aim of preserving older aircraft designs.

== History ==
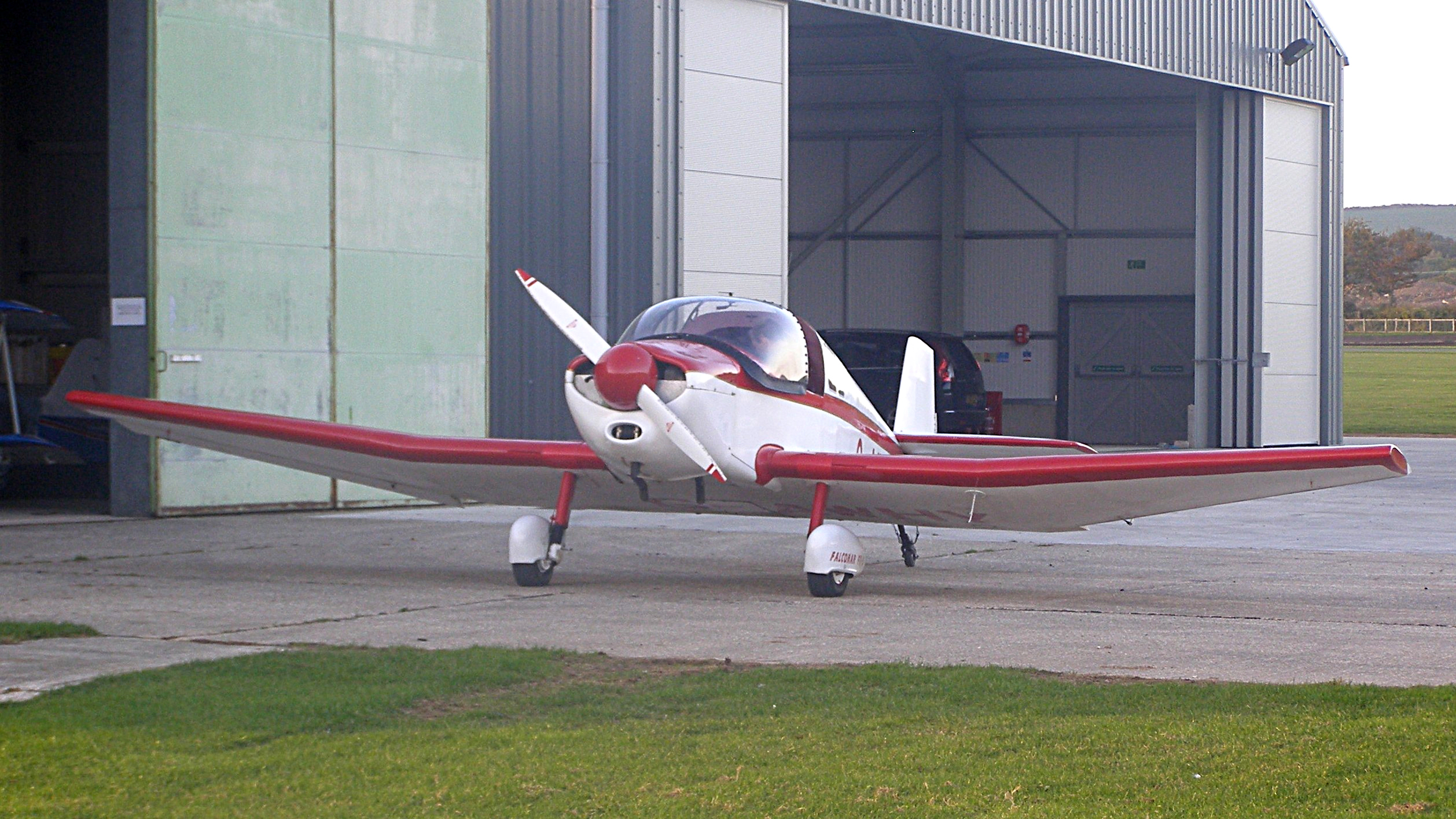
Falconar F11 Sporty

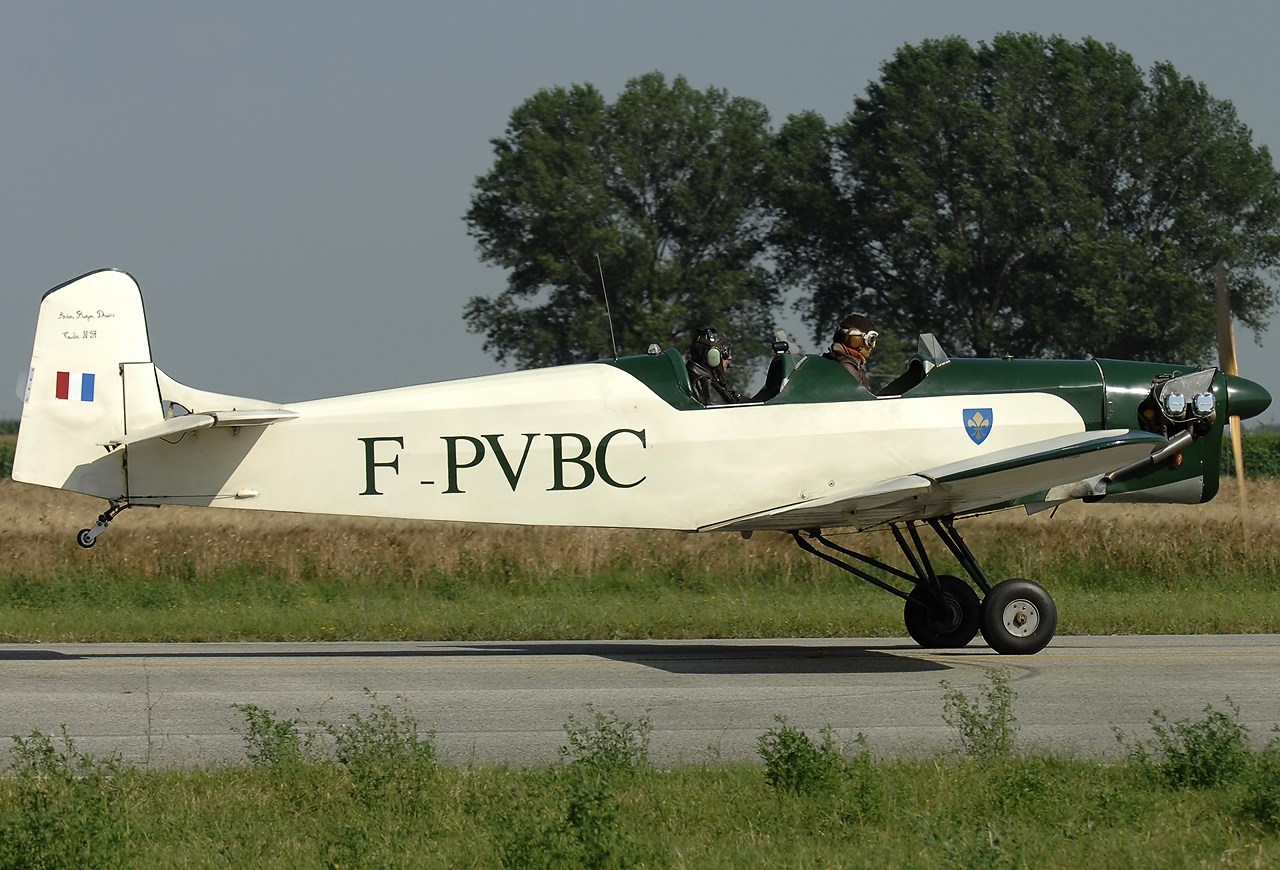
Druine Turbi

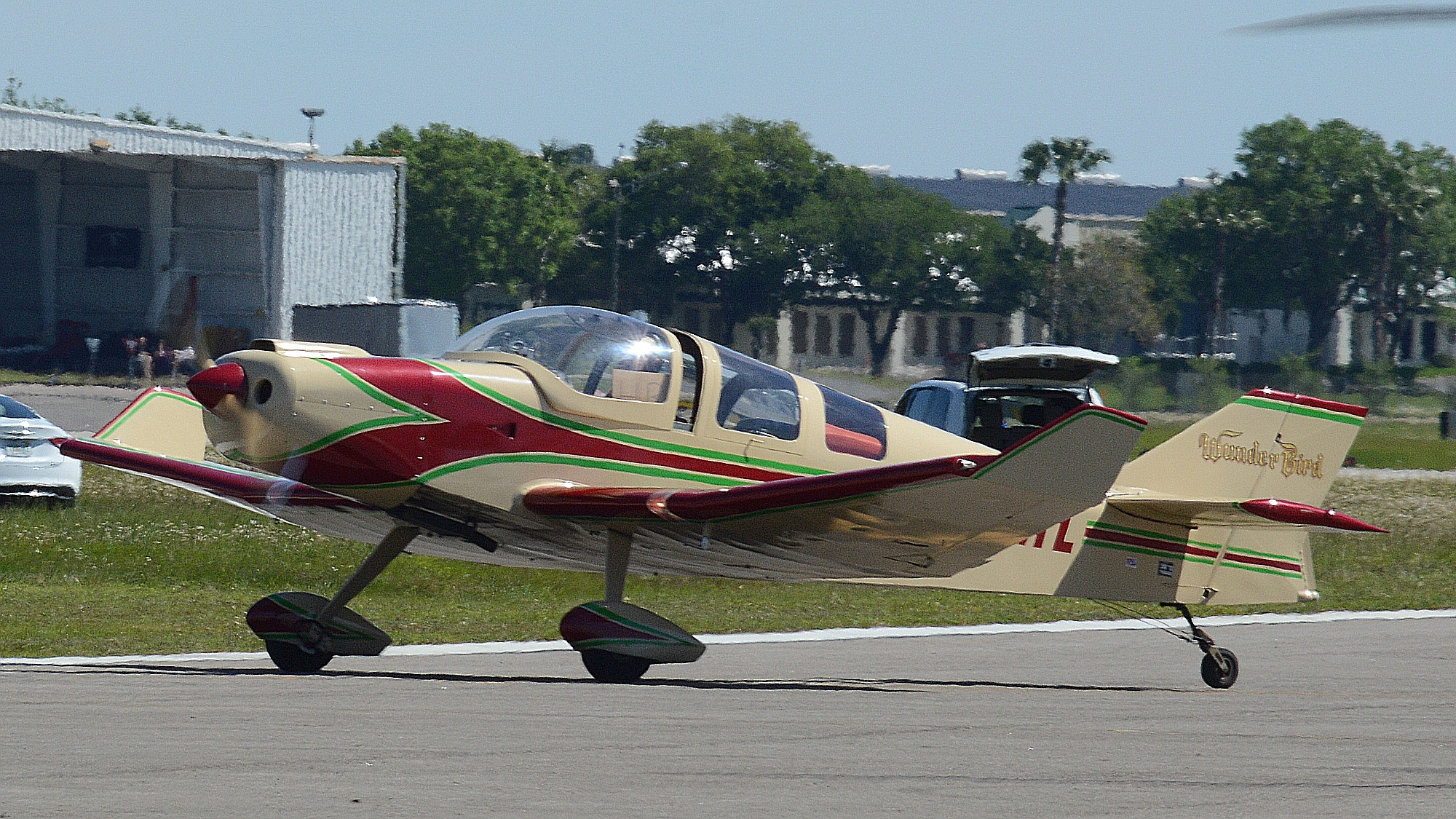
Falconar F12A Cruiser

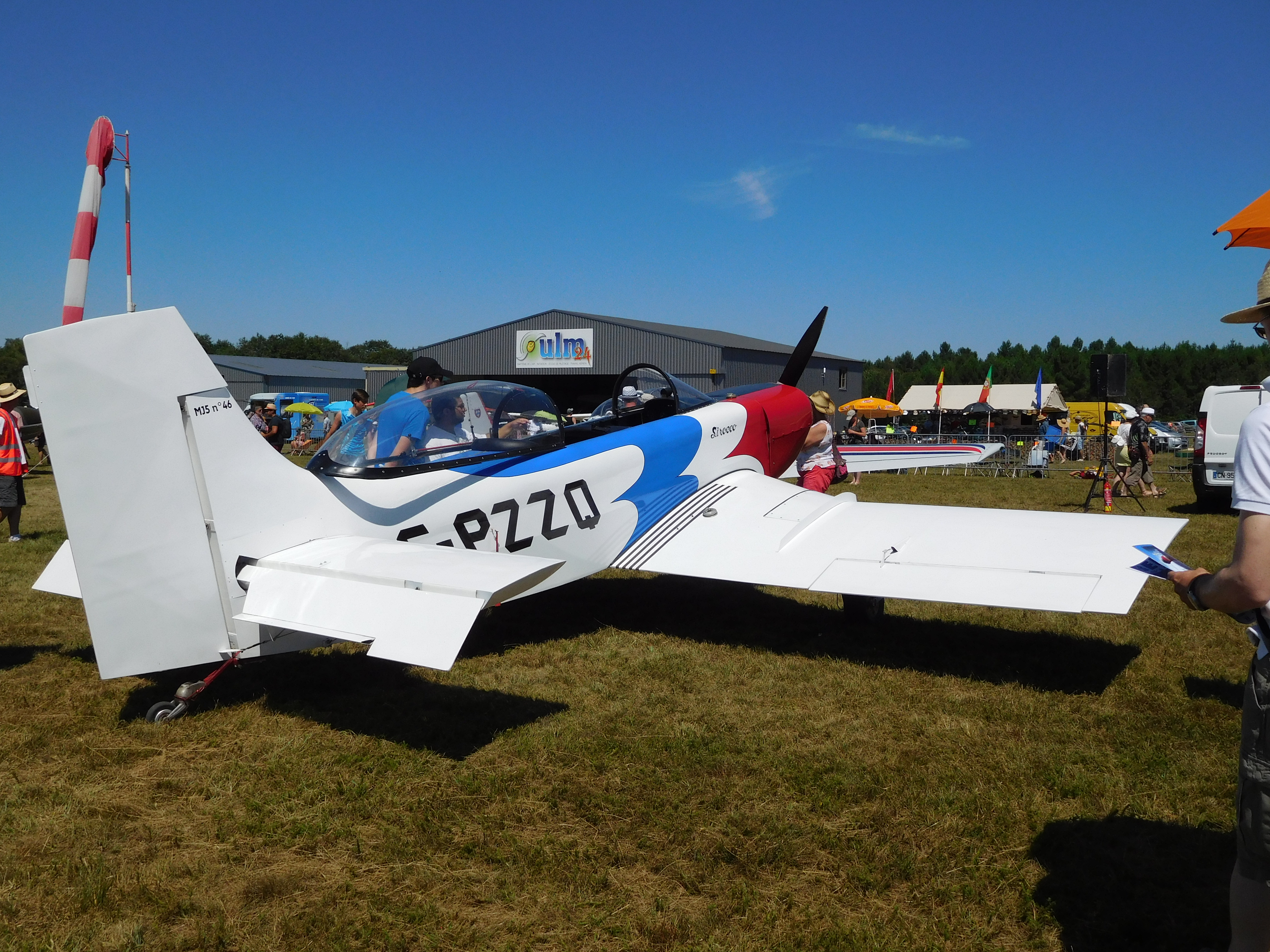
Jurca Sirocco

Manna Aviation was established in February 2012, initially as service intended to match available hangar space with aircraft owners seeking hangars. That business proved to be not profitable and the company expanded into aircraft parts, specifically for the Oceania market, including Australia.

The first product sold was an oxy-acetylene welding torch intended for use in welding 4130 steel tubing. This led to the founding of a new company, Cobra Torches Australia.

The company next became a dealer for Flybox Avionics of Italy in Australia and New Zealand, selling electronic flight instrument systems, engine-indicating and crew-alerting systems, instruments and an autopilot system. These lines were spun off to a new company, Cobra Aviation, leaving Manna Aviation to concentrate on the provision of aircraft plans and kits.

Manna Aviation acquired the rights to many of Falconar Avia's designs after that company's founder, Chris Falconar died on 9 September 2018 and that company was wound-up on 30 June 2019. Manna Aviation acquired the rights to the Falconar F9A, Falconar F10A, Falconar F11 Sporty, Falconar F12A Cruiser, Falconar Minihawk, Falconar SAL Mustang, Falconar AMF-14H Maranda and the Falconar AMF-S14 Super Maranda aircraft plans. The company intends to offers kits for the designs in time, as well as builder-assistance programs.

The company also offers plans for Marcel Jurca's Jurca Sirocco and Druine Turbi designs.

== Aircraft ==
Summary of Manna Aviation aircraft:

- Druine Turbi
- Falconar F9A
- Falconar F10A
- Falconar F11 Sporty
- Falconar F12A Cruiser
- Falconar Minihawk
- Falconar SAL Mustang
- Falconar AMF-14H Maranda
- Falconar AMF-S14 Super Maranda
- Jurca Sirocco
