= American Aerolights Eagle =

American ultralight aircraft

Eagle
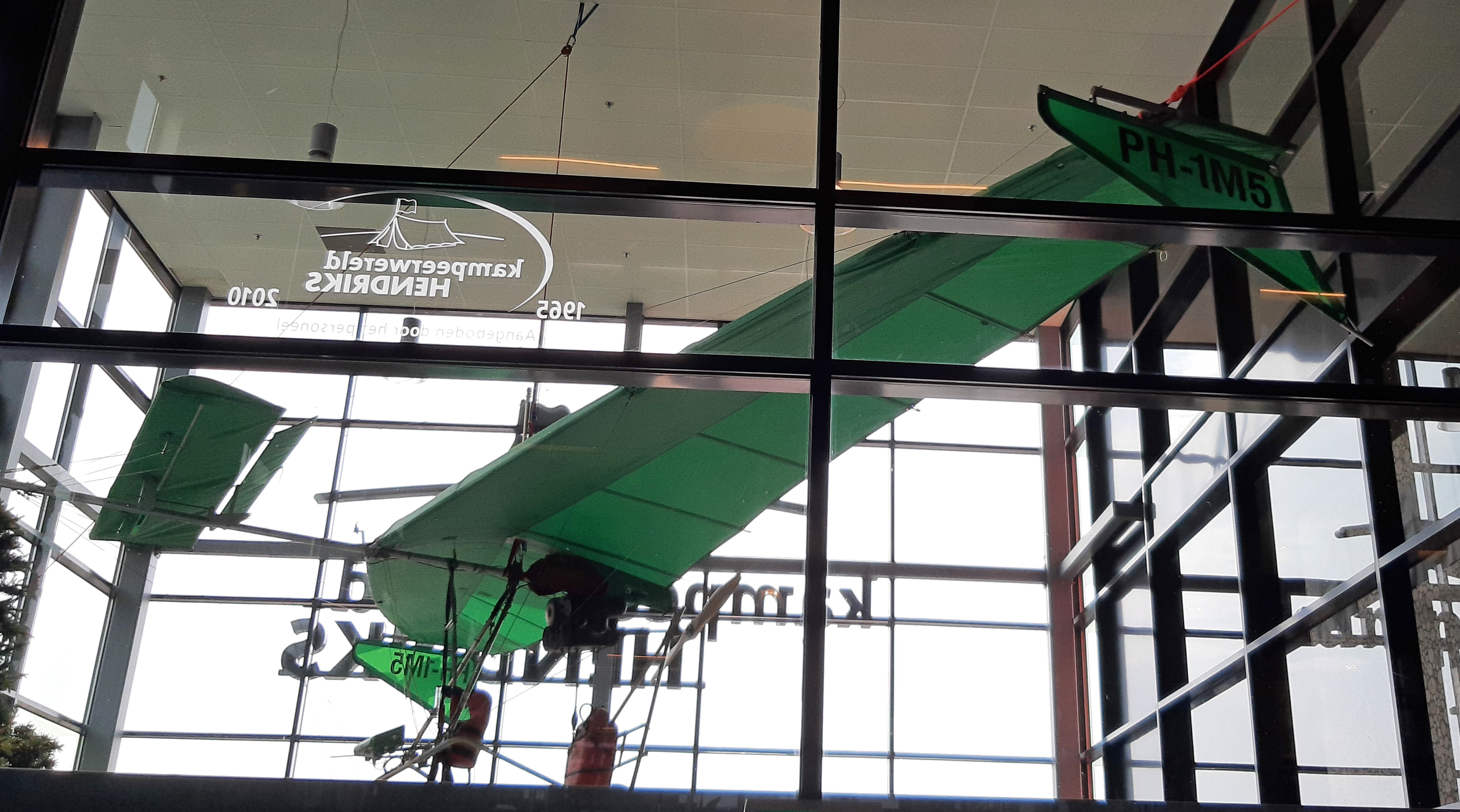

General information
- Type: Ultralight aircraft
- National origin: United States
- Manufacturer: American Aerolights
- Status: Production completed

History
- Introduction date: 1975
- Variant: American Aerolights Double Eagle

The American Aerolights Eagle is an American ultralight aircraft that was produced by American Aerolights, introduced in 1975. The aircraft was supplied as a kit for amateur construction.

Different sources attribute the design to Larry Hair or Larry Newman.

== Design and development ==
The Eagle was designed before the US FAR 103 Ultralight Vehicles rules were introduced, but it fits into the category, including the category's maximum empty weight of 254 lb (115 kg). The Eagle 215B has a standard empty weight of 170 lb (77 kg). It features a cable-braced high-wing, canard, a single-seat, open cockpit, tricycle landing gear and a single engine in pusher configuration.

The aircraft is made from bolted-together aluminum alloy tubing, with the flying surfaces covered in 4 oz Dacron sailcloth. Its 35 ft (10.7 m) span wing cable bracing from a single kingpost. The wing incorporates downwards pointing wing tip rudders and a trailing edge that was defined only by the sailcloth edge. This latter feature caused a number of fatal accidents due to sailcloth UV deterioration. Heavier weight sailcloth was substituted and finally a steel cable was used at the trailing edge. A fore and aft boom that acts as the wing keel also supports the canard surface. Different Eagle models used different control systems, gradually becoming more conventional over time. Assembly time from the kit is 75 hours.

The Eagle was built in several models and in very large numbers. A two-seat version, the Double Eagle was produced and used by the Monterey Park, California Police Department in 1981. The accidents from the trailing edge design resulted in a number of lawsuits that eventually drove the company out of business.

== Variants ==
Eagle 215B
First model, introduced in 1975. It has an unconventional control system, with pitch controlled by the canard surface, which is actuated by pilot weight shift fore and aft in the sling seat. A side stick deflects the wing tip rudders to create drag which causes yaw; the wing's dihedral effect then produces roll. Empty weight 170 lb (77 kg), gross weight 435 lb (197 kg)
Eagle XL
Later model with a more conventional control system. A stick controls the canard surface for pitch control and wing-mounted spoilers for roll control. The downwards-pointing wing tip rudders are retained and enlarged, but controlled by rudder pedals.
Double Eagle
Two seat model.

== Aircraft on display ==
Canada
Saskatchewan Western Development Museum - Moose Jaw, Eagle 215B
United States of America
Steven F. Udvar-Hazy Center - Double Eagle
Netherlands
Kampeerwereld Hendriks, Ermelo, Netherlands - Eagle CA 'PH-1M5' suspended from ceiling over the entrance.

== Specifications (Eagle XL) ==
Data from Cliche.

General characteristics

- Crew: one
- Wingspan: 35 ft (11 m)
- Wing area: 177 sq ft (16.4 m^{2})
- Empty weight: 225 lb (102 kg)
- Gross weight: 1,023 lb (464 kg)
- Fuel capacity: 4 U.S. gallons (15 L; 3.3 imp gal)
- Powerplant: 1 × Cuyuna 430R twin cylinder, two-stroke aircraft engine with 2.2:1 cog-belt reduction drive, 35 hp (26 kW)
- Propellers: 2-bladed wooden, 5 ft 6 in (1.68 m) diameter with a pitch of 36 in (91 cm)

Performance

- Maximum speed: 50 mph (80 km/h, 43 kn)
- Cruise speed: 35 mph (56 km/h, 30 kn)
- Stall speed: 26 mph (42 km/h, 23 kn)
- Range: 50 mi (80 km, 43 nmi)
- Service ceiling: 17,500 ft (5,300 m)
- g limits: +8.0/-2.5
- Maximum glide ratio: 7:1
- Rate of climb: 850 ft/min (4.3 m/s)
- Rate of sink: 300 ft/min (1.5 m/s)
