= Falconar F12A Cruiser =

Canadian homebuilt light aircraft

F12A Cruiser
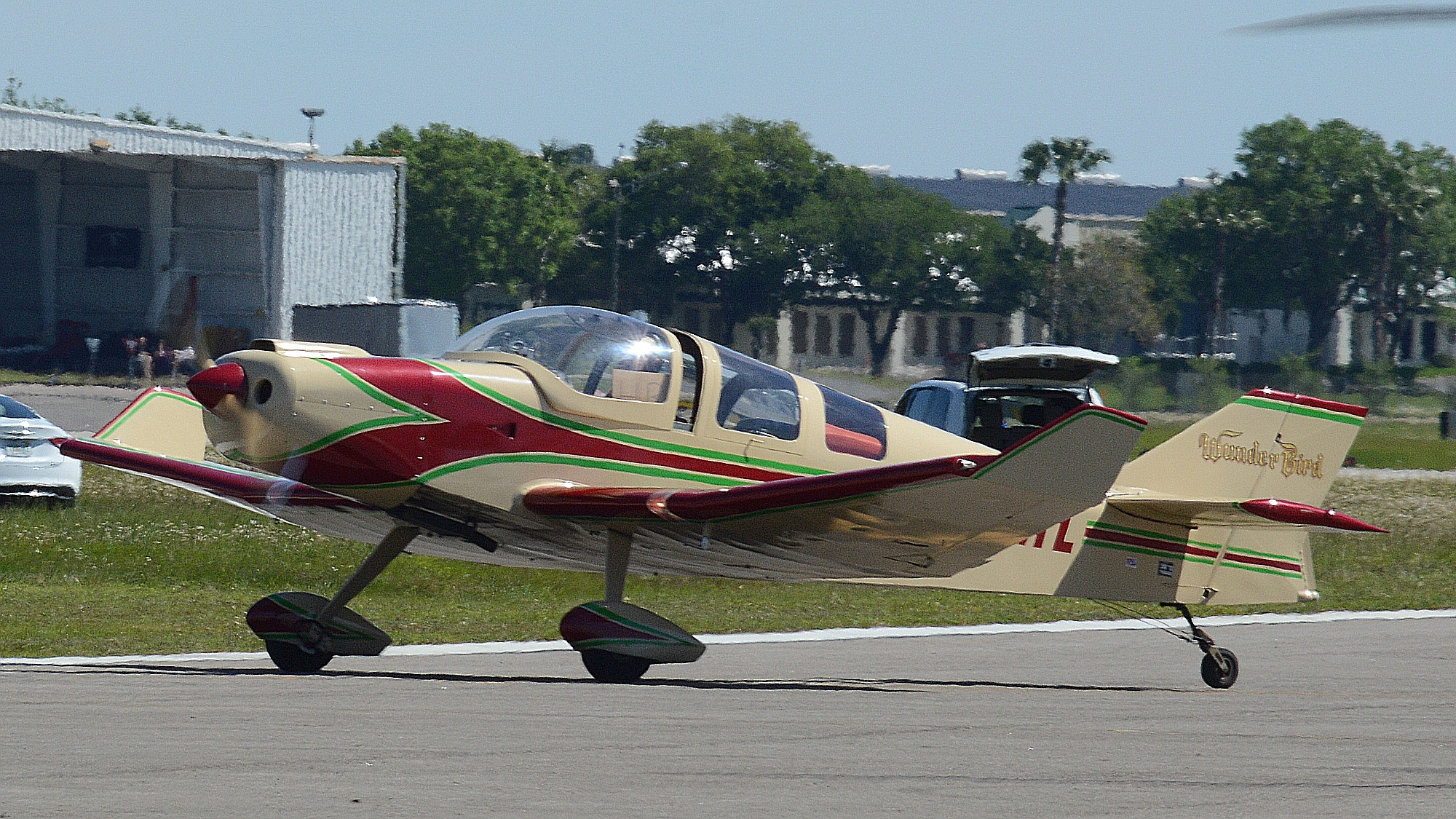

General information
- Type: Amateur-built aircraft
- National origin: Canada
- Manufacturer: Falconar Avia; Manna Aviation
- Designer: Chris Falconar
- Status: Plans available (2019)
- Number built: 20 (2011)

History
- Developed from: Falconar F11 Sporty

The Falconar F12A Cruiser is a Canadian amateur-built aircraft, designed by Chris Falconar and originally produced as a kit by Falconar Avia. The aircraft is now supplied as plans for amateur construction by Manna Aviation.

== Design and development ==
The F12A is a development of the Falconar F11 Sporty, which is, in turn, a variant of the Jodel D11. Falconar indicates that it incorporates a larger cockpit, simplified fittings, shoulder harnesses and aerodynamic improvements to improve stall characteristics over the Jodel design.

Hans Teijgeler of Jodel.com says that the F12A varies from the D11 by using a new wing design, with new simplified spar and rib design and the dihedral point moved inboard, allowing the outer portion to fold for ground transport or storage, but at the cost of added weight, plus the option of a third seat. Teijgeler describes the wing as "less efficient". Teijgeler also notes that the F12 uses much larger and heavier engines with higher fuel consumption. Teijgeler says of the Falconar F12, "the Falconar 'Jodel' should not be looked upon as a Jodel, but as a Falconar. This is [n]either good or bad. Just a fact to take into account"

The F12A features a cantilever low-wing, two-seats-in-side-by-side configuration, with an optional third seat, an enclosed cockpit that is 44 in (112 cm) wide, fixed conventional landing gear, or optionally tricycle landing gear, and a single engine in tractor configuration.

The aircraft is made from wood, with its flying surfaces covered in doped aircraft fabric. Its 28 ft (8.5 m) span wing has an area of 140 sq ft (13 m^{2}) and optionally can mount flaps. The aircraft's recommended engine power is 150 to 180 hp (112 to 134 kW) and engines that have been used include the 150 hp (112 kW) Lycoming O-320 and the 180 hp (134 kW) Lycoming O-360 four-stroke powerplants. Construction time from the supplied kit is 1200 hours.

== Operational history ==
By November 2012, six examples were registered in its home country with Transport Canada, one in the United States with the Federal Aviation Administration and two with the CAA in the United Kingdom.

== Specifications (F12A) ==
Data from Kitplanes and Purdy

General characteristics

- Crew: one
- Capacity: one or two passengers
- Length: 24 ft (7.3 m)
- Wingspan: 28 ft 0 in (8.53 m)
- Wing area: 140 sq ft (13 m^{2})
- Empty weight: 1,170 lb (531 kg)
- Gross weight: 1,800 lb (816 kg)
- Fuel capacity: 44 U.S. gallons (170 L; 37 imp gal)
- Powerplant: 1 × Lycoming O-360 four cylinder, air-cooled, four stroke aircraft engine, 180 hp (130 kW)
- Propellers: 2-bladed metal

Performance

- Cruise speed: 150 mph (240 km/h, 130 kn)
- Stall speed: 51 mph (82 km/h, 44 kn)
- Never exceed speed: 185 mph (298 km/h, 161 kn)
- Range: 615 mi (990 km, 534 nmi)
- Rate of climb: 1,200 ft/min (6.1 m/s)
- Wing loading: 12.9 lb/sq ft (63 kg/m^{2})
