= Druine Turbi =

D.5 Turbi
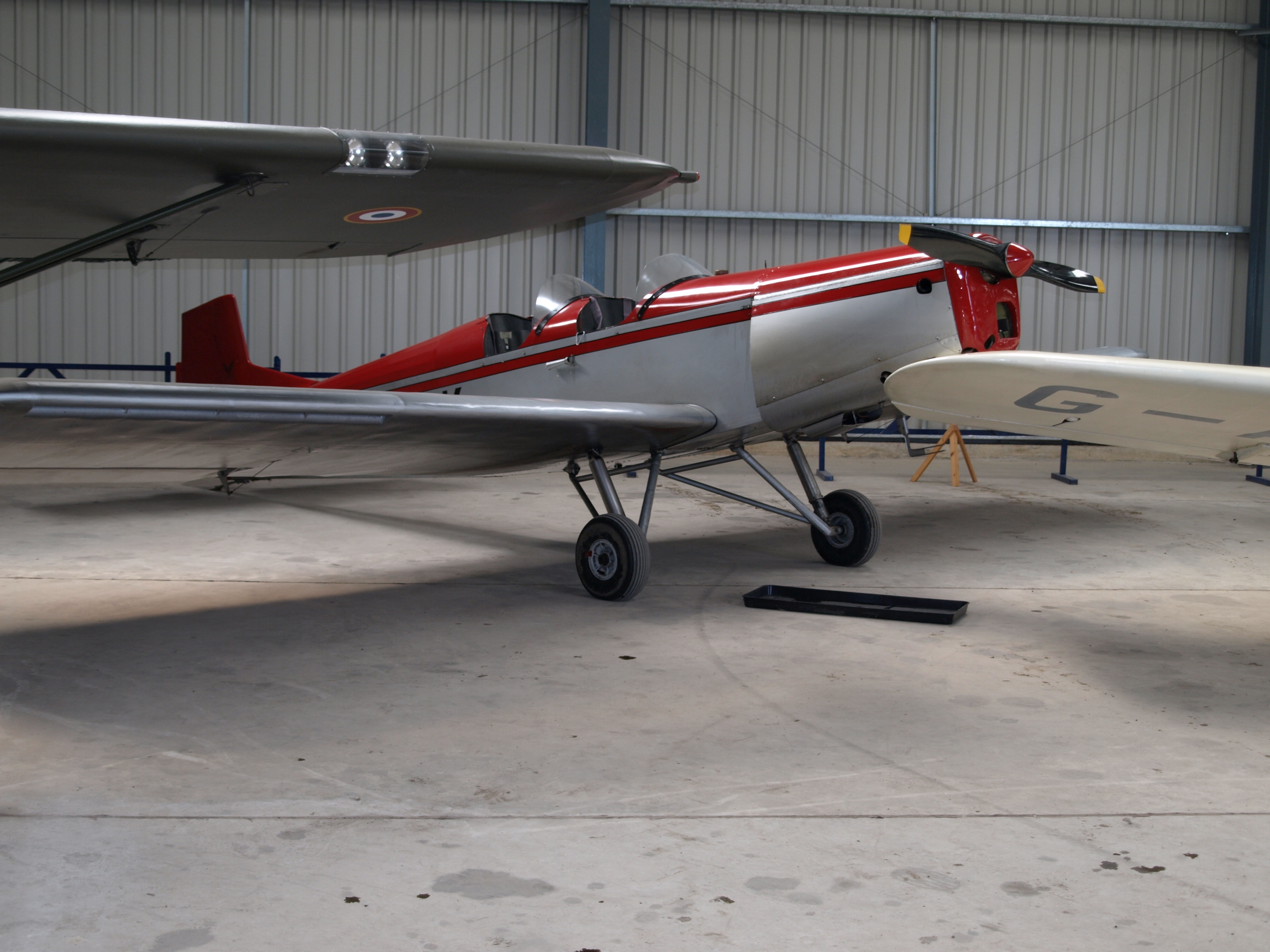
- Druine Turbi at the Shuttleworth Collection

General information
- Type: Recreational aircraft
- Manufacturer: Falconar Avia
- Designer: Roger Druine

History
- First flight: c. 1953

The Druine D.5 Turbi was a light aircraft designed in France in the 1950s for home building. It was a low-wing cantilever monoplane with fixed tailskid undercarriage. The pilot and a single passenger sat in tandem, open cockpits. Essentially a scaled-up version of the Druine Turbulent design, the Turbi shared that aircraft's wooden construction. Again, like its predecessor, it was intended to be able to be powered by a variety of air-cooled engines.

The aircraft was marketed as plans and as a kit by Falconar Avia of Edmonton, Alberta, Canada. Plans are now supplied by Manna Aviation of Australia.

== Design ==
The Turbi is built using all-wood construction. The wing uses a two-spar design. It uses slotted ailerons.

== Specifications (Druine D.5 Turbi) ==
Data from Jane's All the World's Aircraft 1961–62, Jane's All the World's Aircraft 1958-59

General characteristics

- Crew: one
- Capacity: one passenger
- Length: 6.86 m (22 ft 6 in)
- Wingspan: 8.70 m (28 ft 7 in)
- Wing area: 13.50 m^{2} (145.3 sq ft)
- Airfoil: NACA 23012
- Empty weight: 280 kg (617 lb)
- Gross weight: 495 kg (1,091 lb)
- Powerplant: 1 × Beaussier air-cooled 4-cylinder engine, 34 kW (45 hp)
- Propellers: 2-bladed fixed-pitch wooden propeller

Performance

- Maximum speed: 155 km/h (96 mph, 84 kn)
- Cruise speed: 120 km/h (75 mph, 65 kn)
- Range: 640 km (400 mi, 350 nmi)
- Rate of climb: 2.50 m/s (492 ft/min)
