= Falconar F11 Sporty =

Canadian homebuilt light aircraft

F11 Sporty
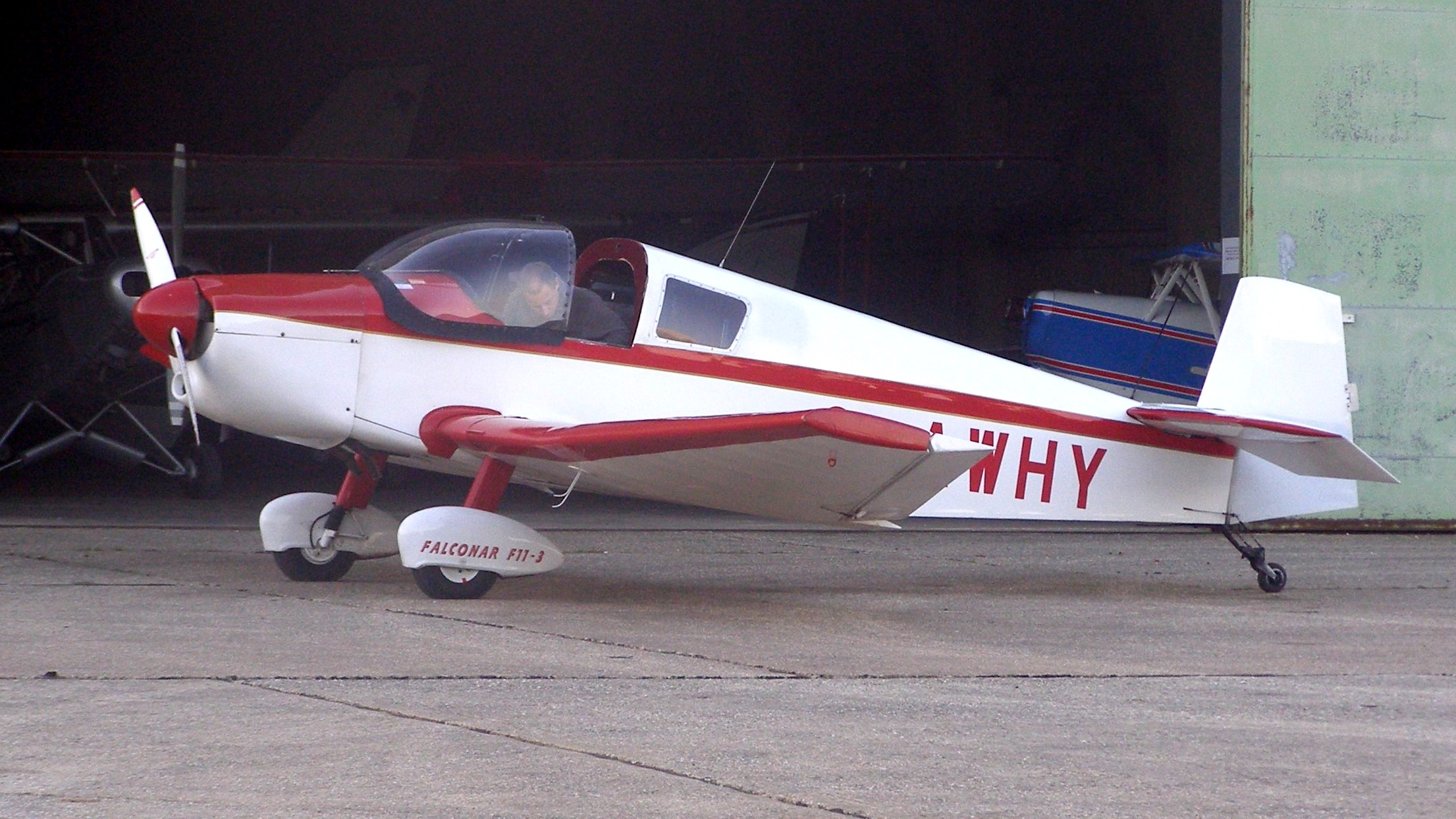

General information
- Type: Amateur-built aircraft
- National origin: Canada
- Manufacturer: Falconar Avia
- Designer: Chris Falconar
- Status: Plans available (2019)
- Number built: 101 (2011)

History
- Developed from: Jodel D11
- Variant: Falconar F12A Cruiser

The Falconar F11 Sporty is a Canadian amateur-built aircraft, that was designed by Chris Falconar and produced by Falconar Avia. Falconar supplied it as a kit or as plans for amateur construction. Today both the F11A and E models are available as plans from Manna Aviation.

== Design and development ==
The F11 is a variant of the Jodel D11. Falconar indicated that it incorporates a larger cockpit, simplified fittings, shoulder harnesses and aerodynamic improvements to improve stall characteristics.

Hans Teijgeler of Jodel.com says that the F11 varies from the D11 by using a new wing design, with new simplified spar and rib design and the dihedral point moved inboard, allowing the outer portion to fold for ground transport or storage, but at the cost of added weight. Teijgeler describes the wing as "less efficient". Teijgeler also notes that the F11 uses larger and heavier engines with higher fuel consumption. Teijgeler says of the Falconar F11, "the Falconar 'Jodel' should not be looked upon as a Jodel, but as a Falconar. This is [n]either good or bad. Just a fact to take into account"

The F11 features a cantilever low-wing, a two-seats-in-side-by-side configuration enclosed cockpit that is 40 in (102 cm) wide, fixed conventional landing gear, or optionally tricycle landing gear, and a single engine in tractor configuration.

The aircraft is made from wood, with its flying surfaces covered in doped aircraft fabric. Its 27.3 ft (8.3 m) span wing has an area of 138 sq ft (12.8 m^{2}) and optionally can mount flaps. The aircraft's recommended engine power range is 65 to 140 hp (48 to 104 kW) and engines that have been used include the 100 hp (75 kW) Continental O-200, the 65 hp (48 kW) Continental A-65, the 100 to 116 hp (75 to 87 kW) Lycoming O-235, the 125 to 140 hp (93 to 104 kW) Lycoming O-290, the 65 to 113 hp (48 to 84 kW) Franklin 4AC, 65 to 85 hp (48 to 63 kW) Volkswagen air-cooled engine four-strokes and the 110 hp (82 kW) Hirth F-30 two-stroke powerplant. Construction time from the supplied kit varies depending on the model built.

The F11 was later developed into the larger Falconar F12A Cruiser, a two-seater with an option of a third seat.

== Operational history ==
By November 2012, 20 examples had been registered with Transport Canada, 13 in the United States with the Federal Aviation Administration and two with the CAA in the United Kingdom.

== Variants ==
F11A Sporty
Initial model with an empty weight of 785 lb (356 kg) and a gross weight of 1,300 lb (590 kg). Construction time from the supplied kit is 1200 hours. One hundred reported completed and flown by 2011. Options for this model include flaps, vertical coil spring main landing gear, tricycle gear, auxiliary fuel tanks, a three piece folding wing and floats for water operations.
F11E Sporty
Lightened model introduced in 1987 for the Canadian basic ultralight category with an empty weight of 560 lb (254 kg) and a gross weight of 1,100 lb (499 kg). Construction time from the supplied kit is 1000 hours. One reported completed and flown by 2011

== Specifications (F11A) ==
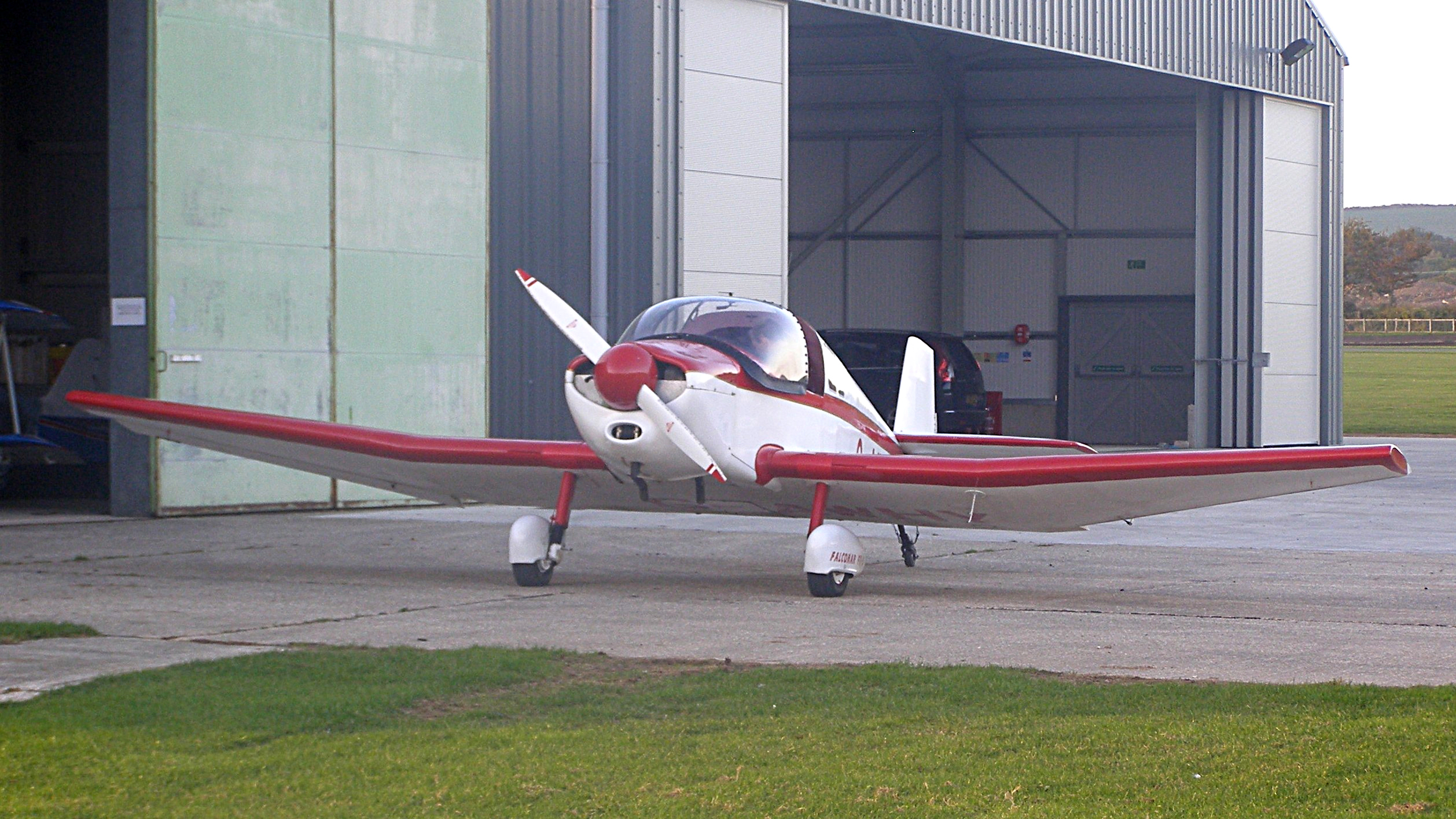
Falconar F11 in the United Kingdom

Data from Kitplanes and Purdy

General characteristics

- Crew: one
- Capacity: one passenger
- Length: 22 ft (6.7 m)
- Wingspan: 27 ft 4 in (8.33 m)
- Wing area: 138 sq ft (12.8 m^{2})
- Empty weight: 785 lb (356 kg)
- Gross weight: 1,300 lb (590 kg)
- Fuel capacity: 17 U.S. gallons (64 L; 14 imp gal)
- Powerplant: 1 × Continental O-200 four cylinder, air-cooled, four stroke aircraft engine, 100 hp (75 kW)
- Propellers: 2-bladed metal

Performance

- Cruise speed: 123 mph (198 km/h, 107 kn)
- Stall speed: 38 mph (61 km/h, 33 kn)
- Range: 570 mi (920 km, 500 nmi)
- Service ceiling: 14,000 ft (4,300 m)
- Rate of climb: 1,000 ft/min (5.1 m/s)
- Wing loading: 9.4 lb/sq ft (46 kg/m^{2})
