= Falconar Avia =

Canadian homebuilt aircraft manufacturer

- Company type: Privately held company
- Industry: Aerospace
- Predecessor: Falconar Aviation Ltd (1960s), Falconar Aviation Ltd (1985)
- Founded: 1960s
- Founder: Chris Falconar
- Defunct: June 30, 2019
- Fate: business wound up
- Headquarters: Edmonton, Alberta, Canada
- Products: Aircraft parts, kits and plans, Aircraft fabric covering
- Number of employees: two
- Website: falconaravia.com

Falconar Avia was a Canadian aircraft manufacturer based in Edmonton, Alberta. The company specialized in the design and manufacture of kits and plans for amateur construction.

Founded in the 1960s by aeronautical engineer Chris Falconar, the company created a new aircraft fabric covering process called Hipec. The company also acquired a large list of aircraft designs that were either orphaned, like the Fauvel AV.36 glider, or long out of production and added their own designs to the line. The company provided plans and kits for all their designs, as well as parts and modification kits for other aircraft, including the Ercoupe.

In 1963 Falconar partnered with designer Marcel Jurca to produce the Jurca Gnatsum. By 1967, Falconar recommended a large number of changes to the design, which resulted in Jurca leaving the project. The modified aircraft was developed as the Falconar SAL Mustang, first flown in 1971 after significant cost overruns. Falconar Aircraft Ltd was sold to George F. Chivers and other investors and operated as Sturgeon Air Ltd with Falconar as an employee until 1973.

In 1985 Falconar established a new Falconar Aviation Ltd. with the assets of A & B Sales and the rights to many Jurca plans. Falconar also carried on operations as president of Hirth engines during this time. In 1994 the company was dissolved following legal disputes and was reestablished in its current form as Falconar Avia Inc. in 1995.

Falconar died on 9 September 2018. The company operations were wound up on 30 June 2019 and the design rights sold. Phil Hale of Manna Aviation bought the rights to the F-series aircraft, plus the Minihawk, 2/3 Mustang and the S14 Miranda. Leon McAtee of Excogitare LLC bought the rights to the Fauvel plans, while Todd Kammerdiener bought the rights to the Cubmajor and Cub Majorette.

== Aircraft ==
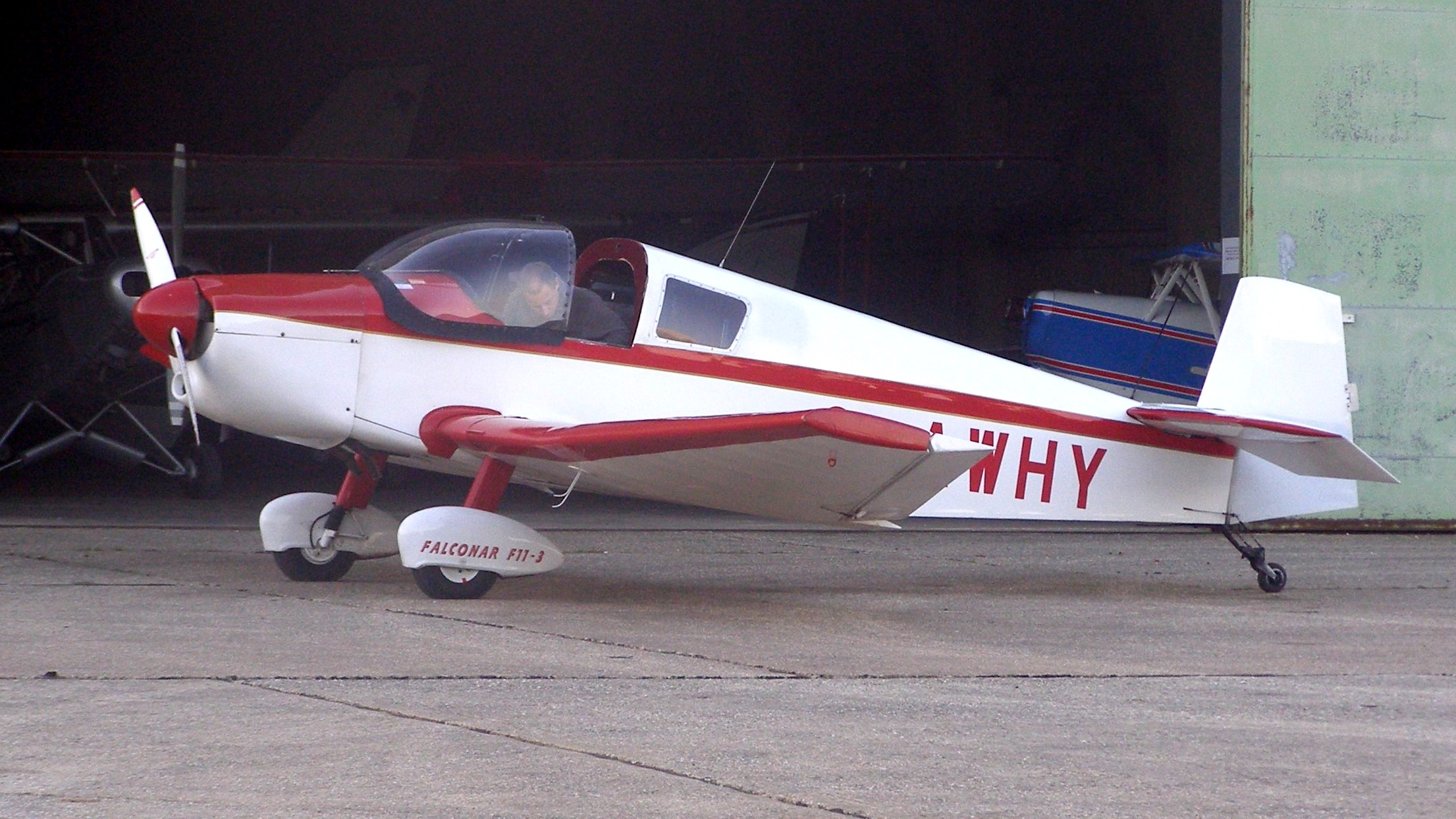
Falconar F11 Sporty

Summary of aircraft built by Falconar Avia
Model name	First flight	Number built	Type
Fauvel AV.36	31 December 1951		Glider
Fauvel AV.361	1960		Glider
Fauvel AV.362			Glider
Falconar AMF-14H Maranda	1 (2011)		Light aircraft
Falconar AMF-S14 Super Maranda	1961	95 (2011)	Light aircraft
Falconar Cubmajor			Light aircraft
Falconar Majorette			Light aircraft
Falconar F9A	1965	30 (1998)	Light aircraft based on the Jodel D9
Falconar F10A			Light aircraft based on the Jodel D9
Falconar F11 Sporty		101 (2011)	Light aircraft based on the Jodel D11
Falconar F12A Cruiser		20 (2011)	Light aircraft based on the Jodel D11
Falconar Golden Hawk	1983	4 (2001)	Light aircraft based on the American Aerolights Falcon
HM.290 Flying Flea			Light aircraft designed by Henri Mignet
HM.293 Flying Flea			Light aircraft designed by Henri Mignet
HM.360 Flying Flea			Light aircraft designed by Henri Mignet
HM.380 Flying Flea			Light aircraft designed by Henri Mignet
Falconar Minihawk		1 (1998)	light aircraft
Falconar SAL Mustang	1969	18 (2012)	P-51 Mustang 2/3 scale replica
Falconar Teal	December 1967		amphibious light aircraft
Druine Turbi	circa 1953		light aircraft
Falconar Master X		models only	Twin engined light aircraft under development
