= Roger Adam =

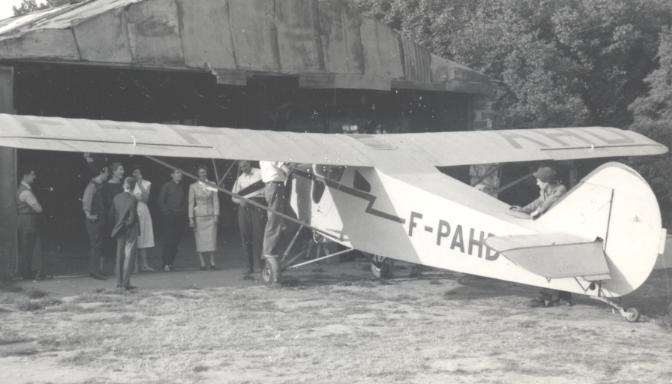

The Établissements aéronautiques Roger Adam (Roger Adam Aeronautical Establishments) was a company that produced light aircraft in kit in France between 1948 and 1955 intended for amateur construction. The company was found by French engineer Roger Adam who was also the designer. One of their aircraft, the Adam RA-14 Loisirs became a real success. Around forty were built in France and the designs were sold in 1957 to the Canadian Maranda Aircraft Company which distributed them in North America where around thirty RA14BM1s were built.

== Aircraft Designs Produced ==
- Adam RA-14 Loisirs
- Adam RA-15 Major
- Adam RA-17
