= American Aerolights Double Eagle =

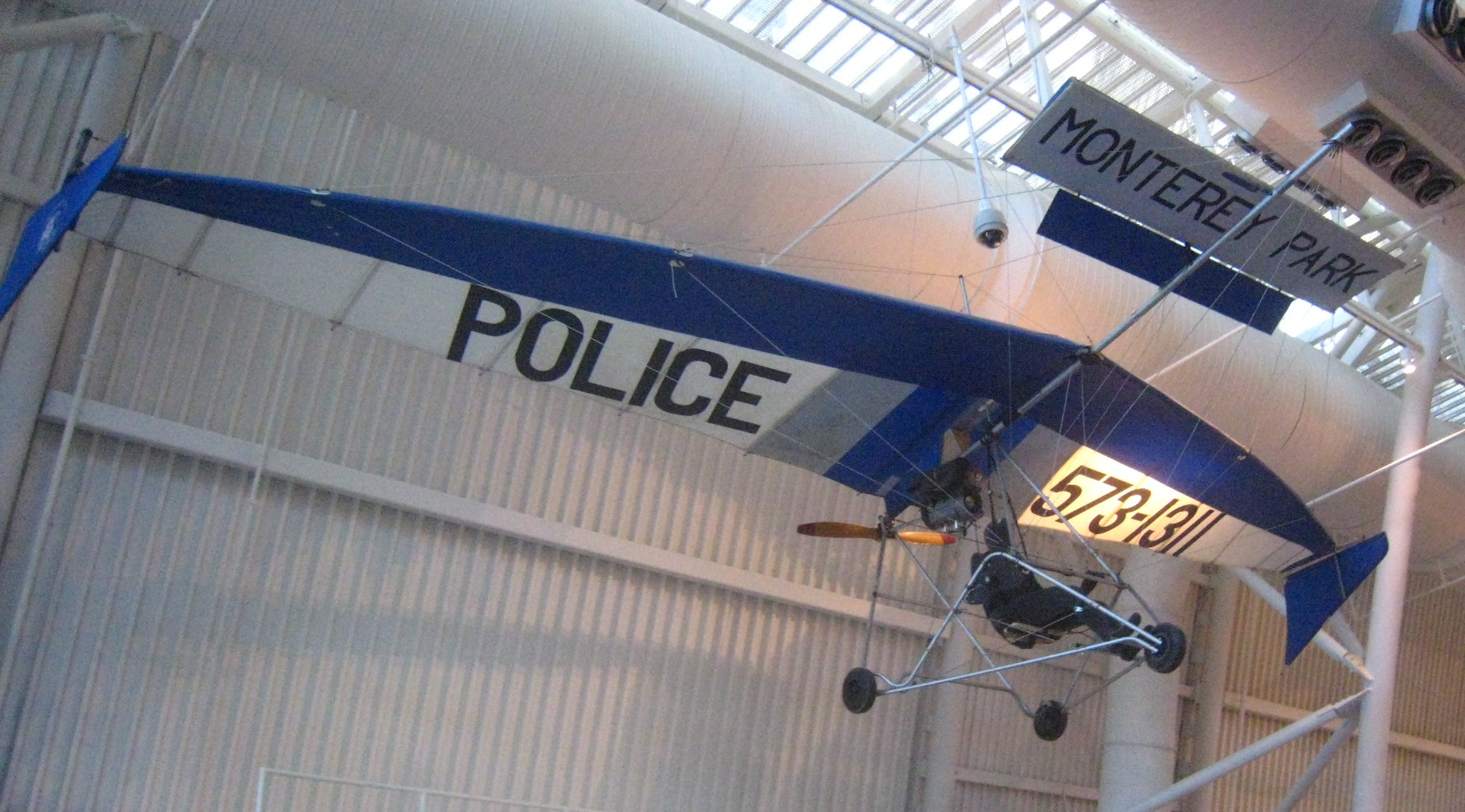
- Monterey Park Police Double Eagle

General information
- Type: Ultralight aircraft
- National origin: United States of America
- Manufacturer: American Aerolights
- Designer: Larry Newman

History
- Introduction date: 1982
- First flight: 1982
- Developed from: American Aerolights Eagle

The American Aerolights Double Eagle is a two-seat ultralight aircraft that can also be configured for single pilot operation.

== Development ==
The Double Eagle is a modification to the Eagle ultralight designed by Larry Newman in 1980. The aircraft features a stall-resistant canard design with a two-axis control system. The entire aircraft could be folded into an 11 ft by 9 inch package for car transport.

== Operational history ==
The Monterey Park, California Police Department was the first police department to fly an ultralight aircraft for patrols, using the Double Eagle in 1982. The program lasted six months and was shelved after seven engine failures in flight. An example of the aircraft resides in the Smithsonian Air and Space Museum at the Steven F. Udvar-Hazy Center, and at one time also in the EAA AirVenture Museum in Oshkosh, Wisconsin.

== Specifications (variant specified) ==
Data from Smithsonian

General characteristics

- Capacity: 2
- Length: 15 ft (4.6 m)
- Wingspan: 35 ft (11 m)
- Height: 10 ft (3.0 m)
- Empty weight: 310 lb (141 kg)
- Gross weight: 660 lb (299 kg)
- Powerplant: 1 × Cuyuna 430R air-cooled two-cylinder inline, 35 hp (26 kW)

== See also ==
- Ultraflight Lazair
