= American Aerolights =

American aircraft manufacturer

American Aerolights Inc.
- Company type: Privately held company
- Industry: Aerospace
- Founded: 1979
- Founder: Larry Newman
- Defunct: circa 1984
- Fate: Out of business
- Headquarters: United States
- Products: Kit aircraft

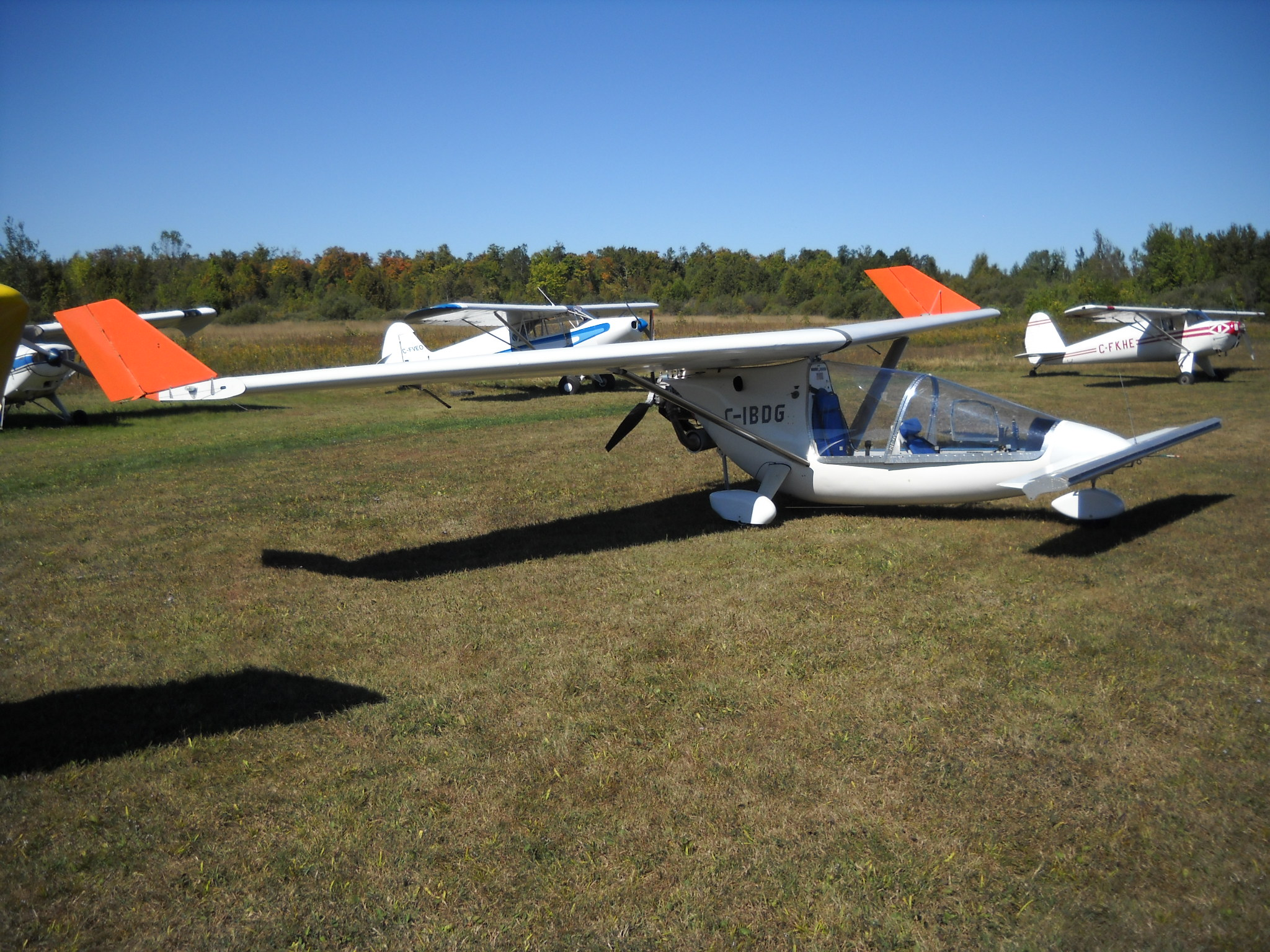
American Aerolights Falcon

American Aerolights Inc. was an American aircraft manufacturer founded by Larry Newman. The company specialized in the design and manufacture of ultralight aircraft in the form of kits for amateur construction and ready-to-fly aircraft under the US FAR 103 Ultralight Vehicles rules.

Newman was well known for his 1978 flight across the Atlantic Ocean in the balloon Double Eagle II with Ben Abruzzo and Maxie Anderson. As a result of that flight Newman received the Congressional Gold Medal from the United States Congress. He died of pancreatic cancer on 20 December 2010 in Scottsdale, Arizona at the age of 63.

The company produced the simple flex-wing single-seat ultralight American Aerolights Eagle and the two-seat American Aerolights Double Eagle as well as the advanced, enclosed cockpit American Aerolights Falcon.

The Eagle design sold in large numbers, but suffered many wing failures that resulted in several fatalities as a result of the deterioration of the unreinforced Dacron sailcloth trailing edge design. The lawsuits, as a result of the design defects, put the company out of business in about 1984, just as the market for ultralight aircraft in the United States collapsed.

The company is most noted as the first manufacturer of ultralight aircraft to have one of their designs used by a police service. The Monterey Park, California Police Department flew a Double Eagle for six months in 1982, becoming the first police department to fly an ultralight aircraft for patrols. The program was ended after seven engine failures in flight. An example of the police service aircraft is on display in the Smithsonian Air and Space Museum's Steven F. Udvar-Hazy Center and one was at one time in the EAA AirVenture Museum in Oshkosh, Wisconsin.

== Aircraft ==
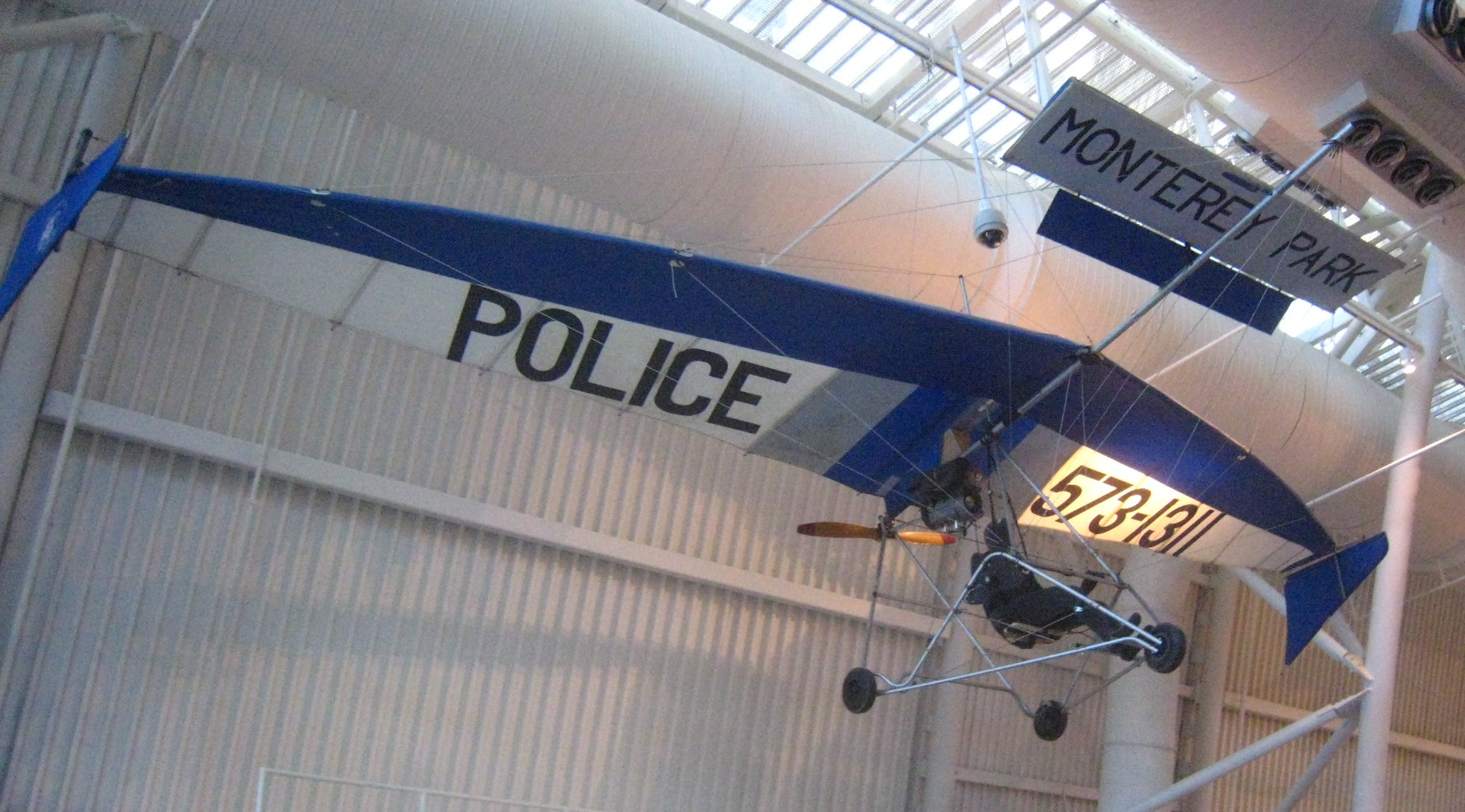
An American Aerolights Double Eagle that was flown by the Monterey Park, California Police Department, seen in the Smithsonian Air and Space Museum, Steven F. Udvar-Hazy Center.

Summary of aircraft built by American Aerolights
Model name	First flight	Number built	Type
American Aerolights Eagle	1975		Single seat ultralight aircraft designed by Larry Hair
American Aerolights Double Eagle	1980		Two seat ultralight aircraft designed by Larry Newman
American Aerolights Falcon	1983		Two seat homebuilt aircraft
