= Mini-Hawk Tiger-Hawk =

TH.E.01 Tiger-Hawk

General information
- Type: Sport aircraft
- National origin: United States
- Manufacturer: Homebuilt
- Designer: William B. Taylor

History
- First flight: 1974

The Mini-Hawk TH.E.01 Tiger-Hawk was a single-seat sport aircraft designed in the United States in the early 1970s and marketed for home assembly. It was a conventional, low-wing cantilever monoplane with a cockpit enclosed by a bubble canopy. The wings were detachable for ease of storage or towing and could be rigged in around ten minutes. The undercarriage was of fixed, tricycle type with spats fitted to the prototype. It was an all-metal construction, and the aircraft could be built from plans or a kit.

== Specifications (prototype) ==
Data from Jane's All the World's Aircraft 1977–78, 546

General characteristics

- Crew: One pilot
- Length: 14 ft 3 in (4.04 m)
- Wingspan: 18 ft 0 in (5.49 m)
- Height: 6 ft 10 in (2.08 m)
- Empty weight: 525 lb (238 kg)
- Gross weight: 800 lb (362 kg)
- Powerplant: 1 × converted Volkswagen automotive engine , 72 hp (53 kW)

Performance

- Maximum speed: 175 mph (282 km/h, 152 kn)
- Range: 700 mi (1,120 km, 610 nmi)
- Service ceiling: 10,000 ft (3,000 m)
- Rate of climb: 1,000 ft/min (5.1 m/s)

== See also ==
- Falconar Minihawk

Aircraft of comparable role, configuration, and era

- Parker Jeanie's Teenie
