= Falconar AMF-14H Maranda =

AMF-14H Maranda

General information
- Type: Amateur-built aircraft
- National origin: Canada
- Manufacturer: Falconar Avia; Manna Aviation
- Status: In production (2019)
- Number built: One (2011)

History
- Developed from: Falconar AMF-S14 Super Maranda

The Falconar AMF-14H Maranda is a Canadian amateur-built aircraft, designed and originally produced by Falconar Avia for the Canadian basic ultralight class and US light-sport aircraft category. The aircraft is supplied as a kit or as plans for amateur construction.

Since the winding up of business by Falconar Avia in 2019, the plans are now sold by Manna Aviation.

== Design and development ==
The aircraft was developed from the heavier Falconar AMF-S14 Super Maranda. The AMF-14H features a strut-braced high-wing, a two-seats-in-side-by-side configuration enclosed cockpit that is 46 in (117 cm) wide, fixed conventional landing gear with wheel pants and a single engine in tractor configuration.

The AMF-14H structure is made from wood, with its flying surfaces covered with doped aircraft fabric. Its 32 ft (9.8 m) span wing has an area of 158 sq ft (14.7 m^{2}) and is supported by "V" struts and jury struts. The aircraft's recommended engine power range is 65 to 110 hp (48 to 82 kW) and standard engines used include the 100 hp (75 kW) Rotax 912ULS four-stroke powerplant. Construction time from the supplied kit is 1100 hours.

== Operational history ==
By December 2011 one example of this model had been completed.

== Specifications (AMF-14H) ==
Data from Kitplanes and Falconar Avia

General characteristics

- Crew: one
- Capacity: one passenger
- Length: 22 ft (6.7 m)
- Wingspan: 32 ft (9.8 m)
- Wing area: 158 sq ft (14.7 m^{2})
- Empty weight: 650 lb (295 kg)
- Gross weight: 1,200 lb (544 kg)
- Fuel capacity: 26 U.S. gallons (98 L; 22 imp gal)
- Powerplant: 1 × Rotax 912ULS four cylinder, liquid and air-cooled, four stroke aircraft engine, 100 hp (75 kW)

Performance

- Cruise speed: 92 mph (148 km/h, 80 kn)
- Stall speed: 36 mph (58 km/h, 31 kn)
- Never exceed speed: 130 mph (210 km/h, 110 kn)
- Range: 350 mi (560 km, 300 nmi)
- Rate of climb: 700 ft/min (3.6 m/s)
