= Falconar Golden Hawk =

Canadian homebuilt light aircraft

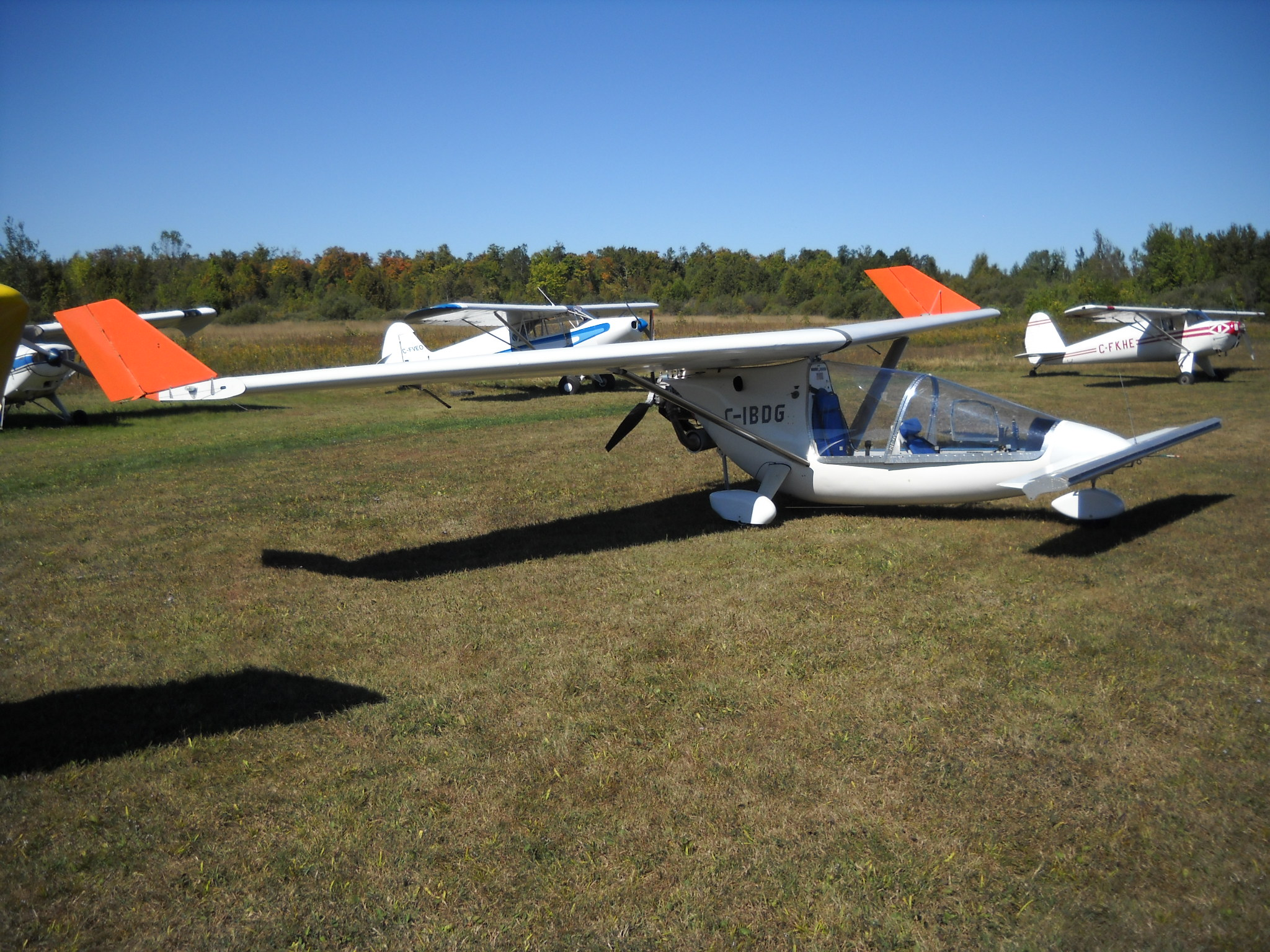
- American Aerolights Falcon XP

General information
- Type: Ultralight aircraft
- National origin: Canada
- Manufacturer: Falconar Avia
- Status: Kits available
- Number built: 4 (Golden Hawk - 2001)

History
- Introduction date: 1983

The Falconar Golden Hawk is a Canadian tandem seat, pusher configuration, tricycle gear, canard-equipped ultralight aircraft that is offered in kit form by Falconar Avia of Edmonton, Alberta.

== Design and development ==
The Golden Hawk traces its lineage to the American Aerolights Falcon of 1983. After Falcon production ended, three companies produced versions of the design. Team Falcon restarted production in 1998 with their Falcon 2000, Falcon East produced one with their Peregrine Falcon and Falconar Avia produced one and termed their version of the design the Golden Hawk.

The design has a composite fuselage and strut-braced wings made from aluminium and covered in doped aircraft fabric. The tip rudders and canard are also fabric-covered. The main landing gear is equipped with hydraulic disk brakes. The aircraft can be disassembled in ten minutes for ground transportation on a trailer or for storage.

The canard surface controls pitch, while roll is via conventional ailerons. Yaw is controlled with wing-tip rudders. The aircraft is advertised as spin-proof.

The Golden Hawk has been well received. Reviewer Andre Cliche described it as "a fantastic-looking aircraft that has no equal to stimulate the public's interest. Because of its futuristic looks Hollywood has used it several times in movies."

== Variants ==
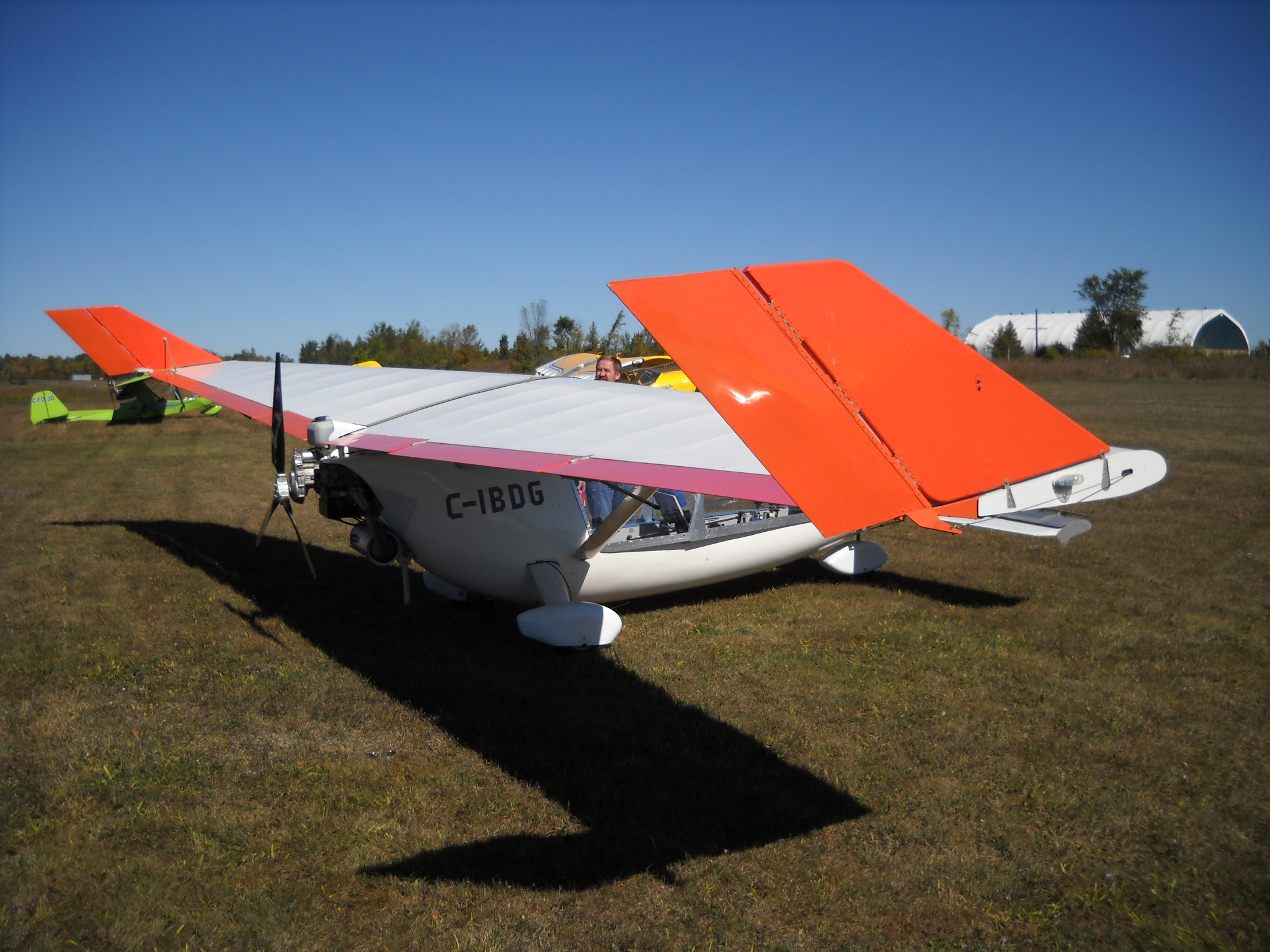
American Aerolights Falcon XP, showing engine and winglets

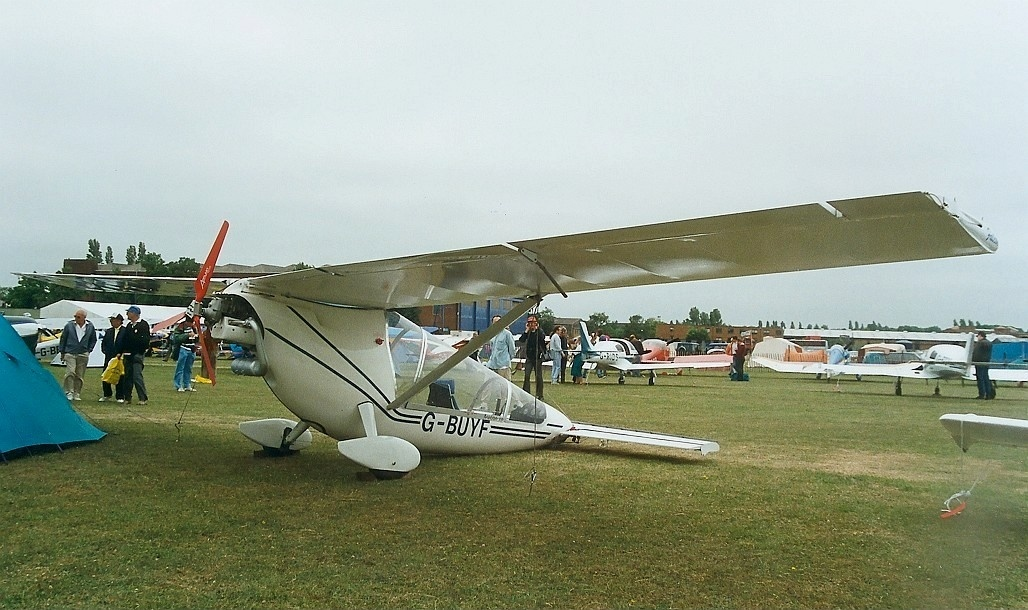
American Aerolights Falcon XP in the United Kingdom.

American Aerolights Falcon
Initial production version, introduced in 1983. Production ended by about 1984.
Team Falcon Falcon 2000
Improved production version introduced in 1998. Features longer landing gear to accommodate a large diameter propeller.
Falcon East Peregrine Falcon
FAR 103 Ultralight Vehicles category single seater with a Rotax 447 powerplant of 40 hp (30 kW) and a glide ratio of 14:1.
Falconar ARV-1L Golden Hawk
Earlier production version, powered by a Hirth 2703 powerplant of 55 hp (41 kW) or other two-stroke engines of 50 to 60 hp (37 to 45 kW).
Falconar ARV-1K Golden Hawk
Current production version, powered by a Hirth 2703 powerplant of 55 hp (41 kW) or other two-stroke engines of 50 to 60 hp (37 to 45 kW).

== Specifications (Golden Hawk) ==
Data from Cliche and Falconar Avia

General characteristics

- Crew: one
- Capacity: one passenger
- Length: 14 ft 0 in (4.27 m)
- Wingspan: 34 ft 0 in (10.36 m)
- Wing area: 168 sq ft (15.6 m^{2}) including canard
- Empty weight: 500 lb (227 kg)
- Gross weight: 990 lb (449 kg)
- Fuel capacity: 9 US gallons (34 litres)
- Powerplant: 1 × Hirth 2703 twin cylinder, two-stroke aircraft engine, 55 hp (41 kW)

Performance

- Maximum speed: 130 mph (210 km/h, 110 kn)
- Cruise speed: 100 mph (160 km/h, 87 kn)
- Stall speed: 40 mph (64 km/h, 35 kn)
- Never exceed speed: 130 mph (210 km/h, 110 kn)
- Range: 200 mi (320 km, 170 nmi)
- Rate of climb: 800 ft/min (4.1 m/s)
