= Adam RA-14 Loisirs =

French general aviation aircraft designed by Roger Adam

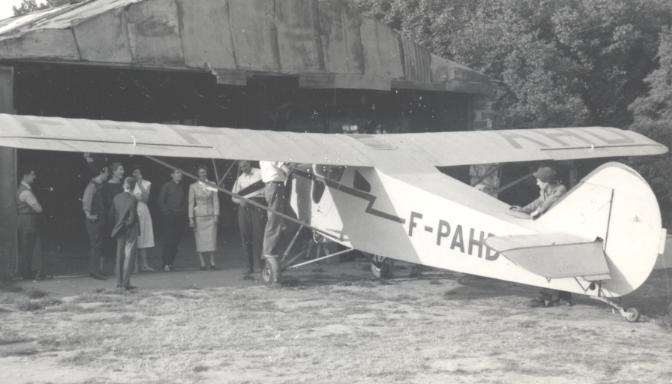
- RA-14 Loisirs at Mery-sur-Oise airfield near Paris in May 1957

General information
- Type: light sporting high-wing cabin monoplane
- National origin: France
- Manufacturer: Etablissements Aeronautiques R. Adam
- Designer: Roger Adam
- Status: Rights sold to Maranda Aircraft Company LTD in 1957
- Primary user: private owners and aero clubs

History
- First flight: 16 March 1948
- Variant: Falconar AMF-S14

The RA-14 Loisirs was a French two-seat high-wing light touring aircraft designed by Roger Adam shortly after World War II.

== Design and production ==
The Loisirs ("Leisure") was designed in May 1945 by Roger Adam and built by Etablissements Aeronautiques R. Adam. It was a tube, wood and fabric two-seater suitable for amateur construction. It was a high-wing braced monoplane with a fixed tail-wheel undercarriage. The seats were positioned side-by-side.

The company sold plans and manufactured parts for the aircraft which could be fitted with a range of engines of between 65 and 80 hp (48 and 60 kW). These included the Régnier 4D, Continental A65, Continental A75 and Continental C90 engines.

== Variants ==
The design rights were sold in 1957 to the Maranda Aircraft Company of Canada who sold plans for amateur construction of the RA14BM1 Loisirs as the Falconar AMF-S14. More than 30 examples were built in North America.

Adam RA-14 Loisirs
Falconar AMF-S14
Homebuilt variant
RA-14 SL "Super Loisirs"
modified wing and tail with trim tabs

== Survivors ==
Of the French production of 40 Loisirs, 17 were active in 1965 and five were still flying in the country in 2001.

== Specifications ==
Data from Airlife's World Aircraft

General characteristics

- Crew: 2
- Length: 6.99 m (22 ft 11 in)
- Wingspan: 10.90 m (35 ft 9 in)
- Height: 2.21 m (7 ft 3 in)
- Wing area: 16.0 m^{2} (172 sq ft)
- Empty weight: 279 kg (616 lb)
- Gross weight: 479 kg (1,056 lb)
- Powerplant: 1 × Continental A65 air-cooled flat-four, 48 kW (65 hp)

Performance

- Maximum speed: 140 km/h (87 mph, 76 kn)
- Cruise speed: 121 km/h (75 mph, 65 kn)
- Range: 450 km (280 mi, 240 nmi)
- Service ceiling: 4,000 m (13,000 ft)
