= Falconar Minihawk =

Canadian homebuilt light aircraft

Minihawk
- Minihawk prototype

General information
- Type: Amateur-built aircraft
- National origin: Canada
- Manufacturer: Falconar Avia; Manna Aviation
- Status: In production (2019)
- Number built: At least one

The Falconar Minihawk is a Canadian amateur-built aircraft, originally produced by Falconar Avia. The aircraft is supplied as a kit or plans for amateur construction.

Since the winding up of business by Falconar Avia in 2019, the plans are now sold by Manna Aviation.

== Design and development ==
The aircraft features a cantilever low-wing, a two-seats-in-side-by-side configuration enclosed cockpit under a sliding canopy, fixed tricycle landing gear or, optionally, conventional landing gear, and a single engine in tractor configuration.

The Minihawk is made from wood, with its flying surfaces covered in doped aircraft fabric. Its 25.5 ft (7.8 m) span wing has an area of 106 sq ft (9.8 m^{2}) and mounts flaps. The cockpit is 40 in (102 cm) wide. The aircraft's recommended engine power range is 65 to 100 hp (48 to 75 kW) and standard engines used include the 100 hp (75 kW) Continental O-200 four-stroke powerplant. Construction time from the supplied kit is estimated as 1500 hours.

== Operational history ==
Even though a prototype was constructed, by November 2012 no examples were registered in its home country with Transport Canada.

== Specifications (Minihawk) ==
Data from Purdy

General characteristics

- Crew: one
- Capacity: one passenger
- Length: 18 ft 0 in (5.49 m)
- Wingspan: 25 ft 6 in (7.77 m)
- Wing area: 106 sq ft (9.8 m^{2})
- Empty weight: 645 lb (293 kg)
- Gross weight: 1,070 lb (485 kg)
- Fuel capacity: 15 U.S. gallons (57 L; 12 imp gal)
- Powerplant: 1 × Continental O-200 four cylinder, air-cooled, four stroke aircraft engine, 100 hp (75 kW)
- Propellers: 2-bladed metal

Performance

- Maximum speed: 128 mph (206 km/h, 111 kn)
- Cruise speed: 115 mph (185 km/h, 100 kn)
- Stall speed: 50 mph (80 km/h, 43 kn) flaps down
- Range: 570 mi (920 km, 500 nmi)
- Rate of climb: 1,350 ft/min (6.9 m/s)
- Wing loading: 10.0 lb/sq ft (49 kg/m^{2})

== See also ==
- Mini-Hawk Tiger-Hawk - American aircraft with a similar name
