= Falconar AMF-S14 Super Maranda =

AMF-S14 Maranda

General information
- Type: Utility aircraft
- Manufacturer: Falconar Avia; Manna Aviation
- Designer: Chris Falconar
- Number built: 95 (2011)

History
- First flight: 1961
- Developed from: Adam RA-14 Loisirs
- Variant: Falconar AMF-14H Maranda

The Falconar AMF-S14 Maranda is a two-seat, light aircraft first flown in Canada in 1961 and originally marketed for amateur construction by Falconar Avia.

Since the winding up of business by Falconar Avia in 2019, the plans are now sold by Manna Aviation.

== Design ==
Based on the Adam RA-14 Loisirs, it is a conventional high-wing strut-braced monoplane with fixed, tailwheel undercarriage. The fuselage is wood construction with fabric covering with a folding wing. The pilot and single passenger sit side-by-side in a fully enclosed cabin. One example has been built as a floatplane with fiberglass covered wooden floats using Falconar plans. The airfoil employed is a NACA 23012.

Acceptable installed engine power ranges from 85 to 150 hp (63 to 112 kW).

== Specifications (typical Super Maranda) ==
Data from Air Trails

General characteristics

- Crew: One
- Capacity: one passenger
- Length: 6.70 m (23 ft 0 in)
- Wingspan: 9.67 m (31 ft 9 in)
- Height: 2.18 m (7 ft 2 in)
- Wing area: 14.7 m^{2} (158 sq ft)
- Empty weight: 500 kg (1,100 lb)
- Gross weight: 840 kg (1,850 lb)
- Powerplant: 1 × Lycoming O-320 four-cylinder horizontally-opposed air-cooled piston engine , 112 kW (150 hp)

Performance

- Maximum speed: 240 km/h (150 mph, 130 kn)
- Cruise speed: 193 km/h (120 mph, 100 kn)
- Range: 770 km (480 mi, 420 nmi)
- Service ceiling: 6,100 m (20,000 ft)

== See also ==
Related development

- Adam RA-14 Loisirs
