= Akaflieg Braunschweig SB-6 Nixope =

German single-seat glider, 1961

SB-6 Nixope

General information
- Type: Experimental competition glider
- National origin: German Federal Republic
- Manufacturer: Akaflieg Braunschweig
- Designer: Björn Stender and O. Heise
- Number built: 1

History
- First flight: 2 February 1961
- Developed into: Glasflügel BS-1; Akaflieg Braunschweig SB-7 Nimbus

The Akaflieg Braunschweig SB-6 Nixope (English: Water Sprite) was an early (1961) GRP high performance single seat glider designed and built in Germany by aeronautical students from Brunswick University. It competed in the 1961 German National gliding competition, coming sixth, and led directly to two further GRP aircraft.

== Design and development ==
The 1961 SB-6 Nixope was one of the earliest gliders with a glass-fibre structure following two other German designs, the 1957 Akaflieg Stuttgart FS-24 Phönix and the 1958 Hirth Hi 25 Kria. Like the Phönix, the Nixope was designed and built within a university aeronautical engineering department but the Nixope team was a traditional undergraduate one, headed by Björn Stender then in his final year. At a time when GRP techniques were novel and evolving, the Nixope was very ambitious, with a wing of aspect ratio 25, compared with 17.8 for the Phönix and 14.3 for the Kria. Stender had visited Nabern to learn about GRP construction, though the Braunschweig group developed some techniques of their own.

The Nixope was mostly constructed from GRP and balsa. Its cantilever shoulder wing was built around a broad GRP and balsa box spar, with closely spaced (80 mm (3 in)) balsa and GRP ribs. Balsa skinning was followed by a GRP outer layer, without the use of female moulds. The wings were straight tapered, with greater taper on the outer sections. At the tips the leading edges were rounded off. Its simple wooden ailerons were quite short, filling only about 25% of the span. To keep the wing structure simple there were no flaps or airbrakes. The wing was mounted with 1.5° of dihedral.

The fuselage was built in a similar way, with 10 mm (0.39 in) thick planking. It had a very smoothly streamlined and small cross-section shape, tapering to the tail. The pilot was in a fully reclining seat, allowing a long, detachable, single piece, blown plexiglass canopy which did not interrupt the fuselage profile. A retractable, fully enclosed monowheel, with a brake, was fitted. The empennage was conventional and simply wooden, with an all moving tailplane mounted on a broad, tall, straight edged fin just above the fuselage. The rudder, straight edged, forward swept and hinged well clear of the elevator, extended down to the keel where there was a small tail bumper. The elevator but not the rudder was balanced. As the Nixope had no wing mounted airbrakes, a 1.3 m (4 ft 3 in) diameter ribbon parachute was mounted in the tail.

== Operational history ==
The Nixope first flew on 2 February 1961. It proved to have good performance and later that year Stender flew it into sixth position in the German National Championships, even though it was not easy to fly and despite his lack of competitive experience. After Stender had graduated he received funding and facilities from Heli Lausch, an affluent South African pilot, to build a new aircraft closely based on the Nixope and known as the BS-1 from Stender's initials. After his death in 1963 in the first prototype and the non-fatal loss of the second, the BS-1 underwent major structural redesign, becoming the successful Glasflügel BS-1. The next Akaflieg Braunschweig glider, the SB-7 Nimbus, was also strongly influenced by the Nixope.

The Nixope was lost in August 1964.

== Specifications ==
Data from Shenstone and Wilkinson (1963) pp.108-9

General characteristics

- Capacity: One
- Length: 7.50 m (24 ft 7 in)
- Wingspan: 18.00 m (59 ft 1 in)
- Wing area: 13 m^{2} (140 sq ft)
- Aspect ratio: 25
- Airfoil: Eppler STE 871-514
- Empty weight: 243 kg (536 lb)
- Gross weight: 350 kg (772 lb)

Performance

- Maximum speed: 200 km/h (120 mph, 110 kn) placard, smooth air
- Stall speed: 58 km/h (36 mph, 31 kn)
- Maximum glide ratio: best 43:1 at 85 km/h (53 mph), though flight testing suggested rather less
- Rate of sink: 0.55 m/s (108 ft/min) at 85 km/h (53 mph)
- Wing loading: 27 kg/m^{2} (5.5 lb/sq ft)
