= Akaflieg Braunschweig SB-11 =

German single-seat glider, 1978

SB-11

General information
- Type: Experimental single seat sailplane
- National origin: Germany
- Manufacturer: Akaflieg Braunschweig
- Number built: 1

History
- First flight: 1978

The Akaflieg Braunschweig SB-11 is an experimental, single seat, variable geometry sailplane designed by aeronautical students in Germany. It won the 15 m span class at the World Gliding Championships of 1978 but its advances over the best, more conventional, opposition were not sufficient to lead to widespread imitation.

== Design and development ==
The Akaflieg Braunschweig or Akademische Fliegergruppe Braunschweig (English: The Brunswick Academic Flying Group) is one of some fourteen German student flying groups attached to and supported by their home Technical University. Several have designed and built aircraft, often technically advanced and leading the development of gliders in particular. The announcement, in 1975, of a new, unrestricted 15 m glider class led the Brunswick group to the design of the SB-11, a variable geometry aircraft.

A long-standing challenge for the designers of competition sailplanes were the conflicting requirements posed by the need to gain height in sometimes weak and narrow thermals, calling for low stalling speeds for small radius turns, and the need for rapid penetration of the cool, sinking air between thermals. In thermals, wings should ideally be of high camber and be lightly loaded; between thermals, low camber wings with high wing loading would fly faster. Large area, camber-changing flaps were one solution but vortexes generated at their extremities added significantly to the drag, decreasing climb rates. Akaflieg Brunswick decided to follow the example of the disappointing British Sigma by providing the SB-11 with Wortmann flaps along the whole of the trailing edge of the wing, including the ailerons. This avoided the flap-associated vortexes, though any increase in wing area, however implemented, will lower the aspect ratio and raise the induced drag caused by wingtip vortexes.

The SB-11 is almost entirely built of weight-saving CRP. In order to concentrate design effort on the wing, the Brunswick students blended together the front fuselage of the Schleicher ASW 20 with the rear fuselage and empennage of the Schempp-Hirth Janus. This gave the SB-11 a conventional fuselage, deeper forward of the shoulder wing, with a long, single piece, forward hinged canopy and a monowheel undercarriage under the wing. There is provision for water ballast. The rear fuselage is slender, with a T-tail with straight edged fin, rudder and swept, all moving tailplane.

The wings of the SB-11 have 2.3° of dihedral and are unswept. The inner 60% of span has constant chord. The outer panels, carrying the ailerons, are straight tapered with a taper ratio of 0.4. Manually driven full-span Fowler type Wortmann flaps emerge from the trailing edge between rollers, increasing the chord by 200 mm (7.9 in) over the untapered inner wing and by 80 mm (3.2 in) at the tip. Overall the flaps produce a 25% increase in wing area. Their trailing edges carry ailerons outboard and plain camber-changing flaps inboard. Mid-chord Schempp-Hirth airbrakes are placed at about mid span on the upper surface of the wing.

== Operational history ==
The SB-11 first flew in 1978. The flaps worked well, with low operating loads and deploying "at the flick of a lever". It was entered into the 16th World Gliding Championships held at Châteauroux in France in July 1978, piloted by Helmut Reichmann. He won the 15 m class, followed by an ASW-20 not far behind.

The SB-11 provided a useful test of the advantages of variable geometry gliders. Thoroughly examined at the Competition and in later tests, it outperformed the other 15 m class gliders of its day in the climb but, crucially, not by much. Its stalling speeds and turn radius was smaller than that of the ASW 20, good for weak thermals, but was perhaps rather poorer than the ASW in the fast glide. Whilst Reichmann was pleased with the SB-11 at the meeting, saying it was the best aircraft there, he later noted that cross-country pilots had plenty to do already and that finding strong lift was more important than exploiting weak thermals. Experience with the SB-11 and with later variable geometry gliders from the Akafliegs of Munich, Darmstadt and Stuttgart (the Mü27, D-40 and FS-29 respectively) showed that, whilst there were performance gains, these were not enough to compensate for the extra expense, complexity and pilot workload that accompanied them; variable geometry did not, in the end, prove a useful way forward.

== Specifications ==
Data from Sailplanes 1965-2000

General characteristics

- Crew: 1
- Length: 7.405 m (24 ft 4 in)
- Wingspan: 15.00 m (49 ft 3 in)
- Wing area: 10.56 m^{2} (113.7 sq ft) with flaps retracted; 13.2 m^{2} (142 sq ft) flaps extended
- Aspect ratio: 21.3 flaps retracted; 17.0 flaps extended
- Airfoil: Wortmann HQ - 144 - 39 W3 (Note: The Official website describes the profile as Wortmann FX-62-K-144/21 VG 1,25)
- Empty weight: 270 kg (595 lb)
- Gross weight: 340 kg (750 lb) (maximum with 105 kg (231 lb) ballast 470 kg (1,036 lb))

Performance

- Maximum speed: 265 km/h (165 mph, 143 kn) flaps retracted; 140 kmh (87 mph; 76 kn) flaps extended
- Stall speed: 75 km/h (47 mph, 40 kn) flaps retracted; 58 kmh (36 mph; 31 kn) flaps extended
- Maximum glide ratio: best 1:41 at 104 kmh (65 mph; 56 kn) flaps retracted; 1:36 at 85 kmh (53 mph; 46 kn) flaps extended
- Rate of sink: 0.67 m/s (132 ft/min) minimum; flaps retracted, this is at 104 kmh (65 mph; 56 kn) with flaps extended at 85 kmh (53 mph; 46 kn)
- Wing loading: 44.5 kg/m^{2} (9.1 lb/sq ft) at 470 kg (1,036 lb) with flaps retracted; 35.06 kg/m³ (7.2 lb/sq ft) flaps extended
