= Akaflieg Darmstadt D-40 =

German single-seat glider, 1986

D-40

General information
- Type: Experimental high performance sailplane
- National origin: Germany
- Manufacturer: Akaflieg Darmstadt
- Designer: K. J. Heer and D. Teves
- Number built: 1

History
- First flight: 15 August 1986

The Akaflieg Darmstadt D-40 is an experimental variable geometry single seat sailplane, fitted with almost full span, camber changing flaps for optimum aerodynamics in weak thermals and integrated into the wing so as to minimise flap tip drag. One flew successfully but the D-40, like other variable geometry sailplanes, was not commercialised.

== Design and development ==
The Akademische Fliegergruppe of the Technical University of Darmstadt (Akaflieg Darmstadt) was first formed in 1921. It was, and is, a group of aeronautical students who design and construct aircraft as part of their studies and with the help and encouragement of their University. Design work on the variable wing geometry D-40 began in 1980 but the first flight did not take place until 15 August 1986.

As understanding of thermal soaring grew in the 1930s, glider pilots and designers became aware of two conflicting requirements for cross country flights. The aircraft needed good climb characteristics and low stalling speeds to enable tight turns within thermals but high speeds in the sinking air between them. These respectively called for low and high wing loadings on wings with high and low camber. Several designs, e.g. the 1938 Akaflieg Hannover AFH-4 and the later LET L-13 Blaník and Beatty-Johl BJ-2, had added large area slotted Fowler flaps on the inner part of the wing to increase camber and add area when extended. These satisfactorily reduced stall speed and with it the turn radius, but disappointed hopes of improving climb rates because of vortex generation (induced drag) at the tips of the flaps, seriously decreasing the lift to drag ratio. A solution to this problem was to extend the whole trailing edge, including the ailerons, and this route was taken by both the disappointing, heavy and complicated Operation Sigma Sigma, the more successful but still heavy and complex Akaflieg München Mü27 and the World Championship winning 15 m class Akaflieg Braunschweig SB-11.

These last three designs changed the wing geometry by extending the wing rearwards at right angles to the trailing edge. Akaflieg Darmstadt took a different approach, pivoting the single piece flap near the tip and sliding it out from within the wing trailing edge, gaining the mechanism the nickname "penknife wing". As it is extended, a track in the fuselage side guides the thin flap into its high camber position at the wing root. The wing area is increased by 21% with the flaps extended. Although this arrangement avoids the vortexes at the flap tip, like any area increasing method used on a fixed span wing it results in a lower aspect ratio and hence a lower lift to drag ratio.

The D-40 is constructed from a mixture of plastic-fibre composites, glass reinforced plastic (GRP), carbon fibre reinforced plastic (CRP) and aramid reinforced plastic (ARP) with some use of balsa wood. The shoulder mounted wing has a spar built from CRP rovings and GRP-balsa webs. The skin of both wing and flaps is an ARP/CRP/balsa sandwich; the flaps have CRP stringers. In plan the wings are straight tapered, with an increase in taper close to the tips; these outboard sections carry the short span ARP ailerons. The wing has 1° of dihedral and is swept forward at 2.3° at 25% chord. There are Schempp-Hirth upper surface airbrakes slightly forward of mid-chord near to mid-span. When the flaps, pivoted immediately inboard of the ailerons, are deployed the wing trailing edge becomes almost straight, making the plan almost triangular, and 12° of washout is generated by the now strongly cambered inner sections. This produces a lift distribution close to that of the ideal elliptical wing, with its minimum induced drag.

The D-40 uses the fuselage and empennage of the Rolladen-Schneider LS3. This is a GRP shell, slender aft of the wings and with a T-tail with straight tapered surfaces. The rather wide cockpit occupies most of the deeper forward fuselage and has a long, one piece, front hinged canopy. A retractable monowheel undercarriage was assisted by a tail bumper.

== Operational history ==
Initially the D-40 proved difficult for the relative novices of the Akaflieg to fly. In particular the short ailerons were lacking authority. The more experienced Helmut Reichmann did show, at one competition, that the D-40 outperformed the other sailplanes present under weak thermal conditions, as hoped for. The ailerons were redesigned and tall, narrow winglets added, which much improved the handling. In the end nothing became of any of the variable geometry glider designs. They were too complex for club use and significantly increased the pilot's workload.

== Specifications ==
Data from Jane's All the World's Aircraft 1987/8

General characteristics

- Crew: 1
- Length: 6.75 m (22 ft 2 in)
- Wingspan: 15.00 m (49 ft 3 in)
- Height: 1.47 m (4 ft 10 in)
- Wing area: 9.50 m^{2} (102.3 sq ft) flap retracted; 11.5 m^{2} (123.7 sq ft) extended
- Aspect ratio: 23.7 flap retracted; 19.6 extended
- Airfoil: Inner Wortmann 67 - VG - 170 (the VG indicating variable geometry); at tips, Wortmann FX60 - 126
- Empty weight: 284 kg (626 lb)
- Gross weight: 374 kg (825 lb) Maximum 500 kg (1,102 lb) with water ballast

Performance

- Maximum speed: 295 km/h (183 mph, 159 kn) smooth air; rough air and aero-tow 190 km/h (118 mph; 103 kn)
- Stall speed: 65 km/h (40 mph, 35 kn)
- g limits: +5.3/-2.6
- Wing loading: 34.74 kg/m^{2} (7.12 lb/sq ft) minimum, flaps in, 52.63 kg/m^{2} (10.78 lb/sq ft) maximum. Flaps out, 28.70 kg/m^{2} (5.88 lb/sq ft) minimum, 43.48 kg/m^{2} (8.91 lb/sq ft) maximum
