= Akaflieg Braunschweig SB-7 Nimbus =

German single-seat glider, 1962

SB-7 Nimbus

General information
- Type: Standard class competition glider
- National origin: West Germany
- Manufacturer: Akaflieg Braunschweig
- Number built: about 4

History
- First flight: October 1962
- Developed from: SB-6 Nixope

The Akaflieg Braunschweig SB-7 Nimbus is a Standard class glider designed and built in Germany in the 1960s. It was one of a series of mixed glass fibre and wood designs from the students of Akaflieg Braunschweig.

== Design and development ==
The Akaflieg Braunschweig or Akademische Fliegergruppe Braunschweig (English: The Brunswick Academic Flying Group) is one of some fourteen German undergraduate student flying groups attached to and supported by their home Technical University. Several have designed and built aircraft, often technically advanced and leading the development of gliders in particular.

The Nimbus was a development of the SB-6 Nixope. The main differences are the shorter span, 15 m rather than 18 m, and the T-tail of the Standard class Nimbus. Wing construction was simplified by the introduction of a 3.5 m (11 ft 6 in) long rectangular centre panel. Like its predecessor, the Nimbus was built from a mixture of wood and glass fibre. Its shoulder mounted wings are built around box spars with glass fibre flanges and covered with glass fibre laid over balsa. They have an Eppler profile, 2° of dihedral and a taper ratio of 0.49. Schempp-Hirth airbrakes are located at 75% chord. The tail unit is constructed in the same way as the wing and all surfaces are straight tapered. The narrow chord, all-moving tailplane is mounted on top of the fin.

The fuselage of the Nimbus is a glass fibre monocoque over balsa. It tapers gently from wing to tail; forward, the cockpit has a long, one piece canopy. The Nimbus has a retractable monowheel undercarriage, assisted by a tailskid.

The Nimbus first flew in October 1962. It performed very well, but the Eppler wing profile made it a challenge to fly. The recognition of this problem led to the SB-8 but also to a progressive series of modifications to the SB-7. The Eppler wing profile was replaced by one of Wortmann FX-61-163 form, the span increased to 17.0 m (55 ft 9 in), the tail and fuselage geometry revised. It was also given a reshaped, two piece canopy, improved airbrakes and a tail parachute.

Another SB-7 was built by Paul Kummer and Oscar Weisendanger in Switzerland which had yet another new wing of span of 16.52 m (54 ft 2 in), an aspect ratio of 20.85 and a different Eppler profile, 417 rather than the original 306. In addition the wing mounted airbrakes were replaced with a landing parachute. This version first flew 20 May 1967 and was followed by either one or two more aircraft more prototypes.

== Operational history ==
Despite its newness and difficult handling, Rolf Kuntz flew the Nimbus into second place at the 1962 German National Championships, held at Freiburg im Breisgau. Because of its retractable undercarriage the 15 m span SB-7 had to compete in the Open, rather than Standard class at the 1963 World Gliding Championships, held at Junin in Argentina, flown again by Kuntz. He finished 17th in a field of 25.

It also competed in the German Nationals held at Roth in 1966, this time in the Standard class and flown by Eckhard Möllendorf.

The original Nimbus flew with the Akaflieg for 16 years. It was taken out of service in 1977 but was restored and reflown from 1982 until badly damaged in a landing accident in 1994. It was again restored, making its first flight for over 17 years on 1 November 2011.

One Nimbus remains on the German civil aircraft register in 2010.

== Specifications (original) ==
Data from Jane's All the World's Aircraft 1966/7

General characteristics

- Crew: One
- Length: 7.00 m (23 ft 0 in)
- Wingspan: 15.00 m (49 ft 3 in)
- Height: 0.74 m (2 ft 5 in) over cockpit
- Wing area: 11.85 m^{2} (127.6 sq ft)
- Aspect ratio: 19
- Airfoil: Eppler 306, thickness/chord 12%
- Empty weight: 255 kg (562 lb) equipped
- Max takeoff weight: 360 kg (794 lb)

Performance

- Maximum speed: 254 km/h (158 mph, 137 kn) in smooth air
- Maximum glide ratio: 37.5:1 at 90 km/h (56 mph; 49 kn)
- Rate of sink: 0.67 m/s (132 ft/min) at 90 km/h (56 mph; 49 kn)
- Wing loading: 30.0 kg/m^{2} (6.1 lb/sq ft) maximum

== See also ==
Related lists

- List of gliders
