= Akaflieg Braunschweig SB-8 =

German single-seat glider, 1967

SB-8

General information
- Type: Single seat experimental glider
- National origin: West Germany
- Number built: 2

History
- First flight: 1967
- Developed from: Akaflieg Braunschweig SB-7 Nimbus
- Developed into: Akaflieg Braunschweig SB-10 Schirokko

The Akaflieg Braunschweig SB-8 is an experimental, single-seat, high performance glider built in Germany in the 1960s, constructed largely from glass fibre skin over built up balsa wood structure. Two were built; the second of which was later fitted with a high aspect ratio (30:1) wing, becoming the Akaflieg Braunschweig SB-9 Stratus.

== Design and development ==
The Akaflieg Braunschweig or Akademische Fliegergruppe Braunschweig (English: The Brunswick Academic Flying Group) is one of fourteen German undergraduate student flying groups sponsored by their home technical university. Several have designed and built aircraft, often technically advanced and leading the development of gliders in particular. The Brunswick students had been exploring the use of GRP in a series of related gliders, beginning with the SB-6. From the SB-8 to the SB-10, wingspan and aspect ratio were progressively increased. The aspect ratio was increased from 23 to 36.6, resulting in aeroelastic problems.

=== SB-8 ===
The SB-8 is similar to the SB-7, which also had an aspect ratio of 23. It performed well but had difficult handling characteristics, attributed to its Eppler aerofoil section. The SB-8 has an 18 m (59 ft 1 in) wingspan, a two-piece wing of Wortmann FX 62 profile with an unswept leading edge, a slightly tapered center section, and more strongly tapered outer sections. It is built around a box beam, with balsa ribs and a torsion shell of glass fibre laid over balsa. The wing is shoulder mounted at 1.5° dihedral, with Schempp-Hirth airbrakes at mid-chord midway along the center section and ailerons on the outer panels. Both SB-8 built have camber flaps on the inboard wing panel and ailerons which are coupled to the flaps (flaperons) on the outboard panels.

The fuselage of the SB-8 is built with a fibreglass skin, over a balsa shell, with balsa vertical frames and two pine plywood main formers in the region between the wings. The nose is pointed and slightly drooped, with a short, single piece, canopy just ahead of the wings, tapering gently aft to a straight tapered balsa/GRP T-tail unit. The tailplane carries a conventional single-piece elevator and the rudder is fabric covered. On the ground the SB-8 is supported by a retractable, unsprang monowheel undercarriage, assisted by a tail bumper.

The first flight was made from Brunswick airport on 25 April 1967; testing confirmed that the glass fibre structure was too flexible and at high speeds the SB-8 exhibited wing flutter, limiting its maximum permitted speed to 170 km/h (105.6 mph; 91.8 kn). The low wing loading also limited its smooth air cross country speed as there was no provision for ballast. Later, removable steel tubes filled with lead pellets were added to the wing roots of the SB-8 V1 to increase wing loading. A second aircraft, SB-8 V2, was therefore built with a stiffened, heavier wing and provision for water ballast, which addressed both aero-elasticity and wing loading problems, allowing the glider to fly safely, without flutter, at 200 km/h (124.3 mph; 108.0 kn).

=== SB-9 Stratus ===
The SB-8 V2 had shown that glass-fibre wings could be made stiff enough to avoid aeroelastic flutter problems and that the higher aspect ratio produced the expected improvement in glide angle. It was natural for the next Akaflieg Braunschweig design to have a wing of greater span, replacing the wing of the SB-8 V2 airframe with a four-panel wing of similar construction but 22 m (72 ft 2 in) span. At the time of its first flight in January 1969 the SB-9 had probably the greatest span of any glider then flying, though the 22 m (72 ft 2 in)-span Holighaus Nimbus 1 flew only three days later. The increase in aspect ratio over the SB-8 increased the measured best glide ratio from 40:1 to 46:1 and decreased the measured minimum sink rate from 0.61 m/s (120.08 ft/min) to 0.51 m/s (100.39 ft/min). The new wing took advantage of the flexibility of glass fibre to implement elastic flaps. The intention was to avoid the interruption to the wing profile at the hinge, particularly on the critical upper surface, and leakage through it by bending the upper surface instead. This method had been used earlier in the wooden-winged HKS-1 glider of 1953.

== Operational history ==
Both SB-8s competed at the German National Championships of 1968, Wolfgang Beduhn finishing fifth in the V1 and Helmut Treiber seventh in the V2. The V2 went on to become the SB-9, but the V1 remained in regular use at Brunswick until 1989. It remained airworthy after that, though flown less often, and was still on the German Civil Aircraft register in 2010.

The SB-9 was used by the Akaflieg students in competitions between 1969 and 1971. It also gave them the opportunity to film and study the alarming motions of the wing when fluttering, recording their observations on film in slow motion and in the air. Two antisymmetric, odd, sine-like lateral displacement modes were observed at 90 km/h (55.9 mph; 48.6 kn). The fundamental mode was seen, at a frequency of 3.3 Hz but at 140 km/h (87.0 mph; 75.6 kn) the wing oscillated at 5.8 Hz in a second harmonic mode. During these largely vertical excursions, the wing also twisted and its overall motion excited vibrations in the rear fuselage and tail unit. The flutter problems were addressed by mass-balancing, the ailerons, and by a span reduction to 21 m (68 ft 11 in).

The career of the SB-9 ended in 1972, when it was decided to use its wing on the SB-10 two-seater, a new design with a very different fuselage and the span increased still further with an 8.7 m (28t ft 7 in) centre section.

== Variants ==
Data from Sailplanes 1965-2000 unless excepted.

SB-8 V1
Original aircraft, empty weight of 260 kg (570 lb) and a maximum take-off weight of 365 kg (805 lb). Flutter restricted maximum permitted speed to 170 km/h (110 mph; 92 kn).
SB-8 V2
Stiffened wing, weights increased by 40 kg (88 lb). Provision for water ballast, maximum permitted speed increased to 200 km/h (120 mph; 110 kn)
SB-9 Stratus
The SB-8V2 was modified with a four-part wing of 22 m (72 ft 2 in) span, fitted with elastic flaps. SB-9 Stratus was first flown in January 1969. It is Empty weight, 325 kg (717 lb), maximum in flight weight, ballasted, 421 kg (928 lb). Flutter problems were tackled with a span reduction to 21 m (68 ft 11 in) and mass-balancing the ailerons.

== Specifications (SB-8 V2 & SB-9) ==
Data from

General characteristics

- Crew: 1
- Length: 7.505 m (24 ft 7 in)
- Wingspan: 18 m (59 ft 1 in)

SB-9: 22 m (72 ft 2 in) (reduced to 21 m (68 ft 11 in) later)

- Wing area: 14.1 m^{2} (152 sq ft)

SB-9: 15.48 m^{2} (166.6 sq ft)

- Aspect ratio: 23

SB-9: 31.3

- Airfoil: root:Wortmann FX 62-K-153, mid:Wortmann FX 62-K-131, tip:Wortmann FX 60-126
- Empty weight: 301 kg (664 lb)

SB-9: 325 kg (717 lb)

- Gross weight: 403 kg (888 lb)
- Max takeoff weight: 451 kg (994 lb)

SB-9: 421 kg (928 lb)

Performance

- Never exceed speed: 200 km/h (120 mph, 110 kn)
- Maximum glide ratio: 41.6 at 85 km/h (53 mph; 46 kn)

SB-9: 46 at 83 km/h; 52 mph (45 kn)

- Rate of sink: 0.61 m/s (120 ft/min) at 88 km/h (55 mph; 48 kn) at 27.7 kg/m^{2} (5.7 lb/sq ft) and 385 kg (849 lb)

SB-9: 0.51 m/s (100 ft/min) at 80 km/h (50 mph; 43 kn) at 27.3 kg/m^{2} (5.6 lb/sq ft) and 414 kg (913 lb)

- Wing loading: 28.6 kg/m^{2} (5.9 lb/sq ft)

SB-9: maximum wing loading 27.3 kg/m^{2} (5.6 lb/sq ft)
