= Glasflügel BS-1 =

West German open class sailplane, 1962

BS-1
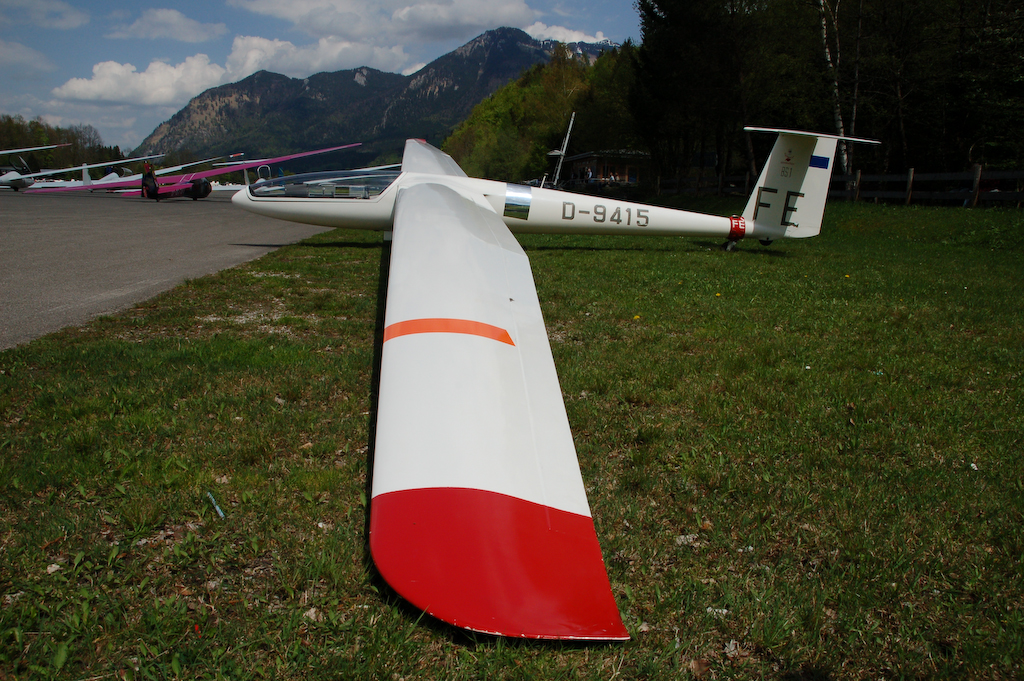
- BS-1

General information
- Type: Glider
- National origin: West Germany
- Manufacturer: Glasflügel
- Designer: Björn Stender
- Status: Production ended 1969
- Number built: 20, including two prototypes

History
- Manufactured: 1964-1969
- Introduction date: 1962

The Glasflügel BS-1, sometimes called the Björn Stender BS-1 or the Stender BS-1, is a West German, high-wing, single seat, T-tailed, FAI Open Class glider that was designed by Björn Stender and produced by Glasflügel.

== Design and development ==
The prototype BS-1 was designed by Stender as the initials indicate; the BS-1 was closely based on his earlier Akaflieg Braunschweig SB-6 Nixope, produced whilst he was still an undergraduate. Two prototypes were built by him and his three assistants in 1962. He was then a young engineering student and designed the aircraft at the request of a South African sailplane pilot and industrialist, producing a design that was very advanced for its time. While the designer was test flying of one of the prototypes in 1963 the aircraft suffered an in-flight structural failure and Stender was killed. Glasflügel then took over the project and re-engineered the design, based on their experience producing the Glasflügel H-301 Libelle. The company went on to build 18 production aircraft.

The BS-1 is constructed entirely from fiberglass and features an 18.0 m (59.1 ft) wing with flaps and dive brakes. For further glidepath control the BS-1 has a tail-mounted parachute. The landing gear is a retractable monowheel.

A planned improved model, the BS-1b, was never produced.

== Operational history ==
The BS-1 was considered one of the first soaring "super ships" and was one of the most high-performing gliders of its time, the mid-1960s. Alfred Rohm of West Germany flew a BS-1 to a world 300 km (186 mi) speed record of 135.3 km/h (84 mph) in 1967. Thierry Thys of San Leandro, California flew a BS-1 on a 917 km (570 mi) flight in 1970. At that time it was the third-longest soaring flight ever made.

== Aircraft on display ==
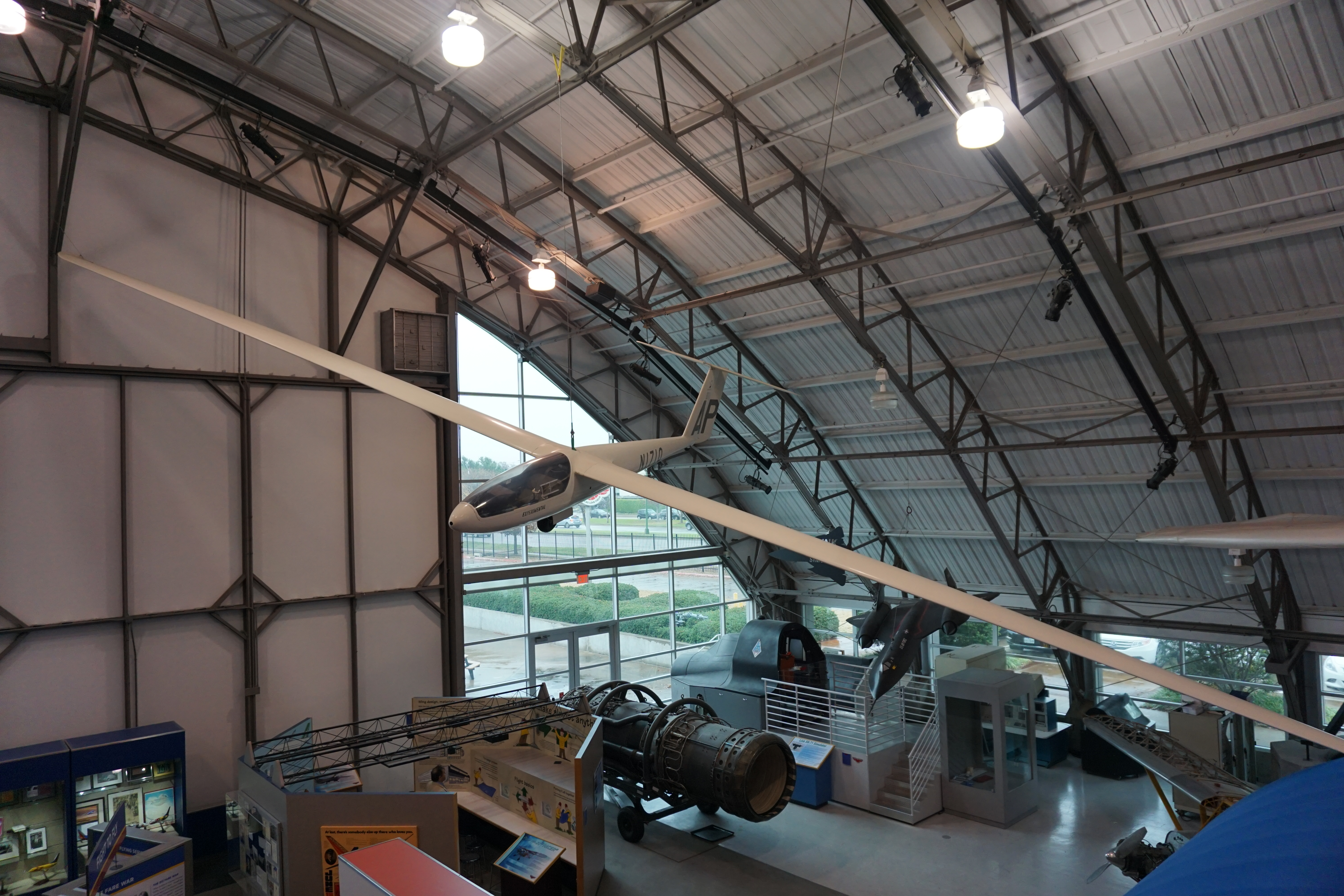
A Glasflügel BS-1 on display at the Frontiers of Flight Museum

- Frontiers of Flight Museum
- National Soaring Museum - one, listed as in "storage"

== Specifications (BS-1) ==
Data from Sailplane Directory and Soaring

General characteristics

- Crew: one
- Wingspan: 18.0 m (59 ft 1 in)
- Wing area: 14.09 m^{2} (151.7 sq ft)
- Aspect ratio: 23:1
- Empty weight: 310 kg (684 lb)
- Gross weight: 450 kg (993 lb)

Performance

- Maximum glide ratio: 44:1 at 84 km/h (52 mph)
- Rate of sink: 0.543 m/s (106.8 ft/min) at 80 km/h (50 mph)
- Wing loading: 32 kg/m^{2} (6.5 lb/sq ft)

== See also ==
Aircraft of comparable role, configuration, and era

- Schleicher ASW 12
- Schempp-Hirth Cirrus

Related lists

- List of gliders
