= Pelikan tail =

Type of aircraft tail configuration

Pelikan tail design

The Pelikan tail is an experimental tail design for fighter jets. It was originally conceived by Ralph Pelikan, who was hired by McDonnell Aircraft, later worked for McDonnell Douglas after the merger of McDonnell with Douglas and, after another merger, retired from Boeing. However, it has been considered or included in design specifications in the McDonnell Douglas BAE Joint Strike fighter (JSF) design which was eliminated before prototype stage

== Advantages and disadvantages ==
The Pelikan design differs from the typical layout of flight control surfaces and empennage (incorporating ailerons on the wing, a horizontal stabilizer with elevators and a vertical stabilizer with a rudder), in that it uses only two moveable surfaces in order to achieve control of pitch, yaw and roll. When evaluated by Boeing engineers in October 1998 while designing what became the X-32, they found advantages of greater pitch control at high angles of attack and that two tail surfaces would have a lower radar signature than the four surfaces eventually adopted. However, they also found that using two larger control surfaces instead of four might actually make the aircraft heavier. The bigger hydraulic pumps and cylinders needed to operate the larger surfaces would add 800 to 900 pounds (360 to 410 kg) of weight to the design. This and other factors made them use a four-surface tail instead.

== Tests by Virginia Tech students ==
Virginia Tech students built a model aircraft with a Pelikan tail and got positive results for its viability using a wind tunnel. The analysis by the students found several advantages such as a lower vertical surface area, which aids in stealth; less drag due to skin friction; and a lower weight due to the need for two as opposed to the usual four hydraulic actuators.

== See also ==
- Cruciform tail
- T-tail
- Twin tail
- V-tail
