= Twin tail =

Type of vertical tails on aircraft

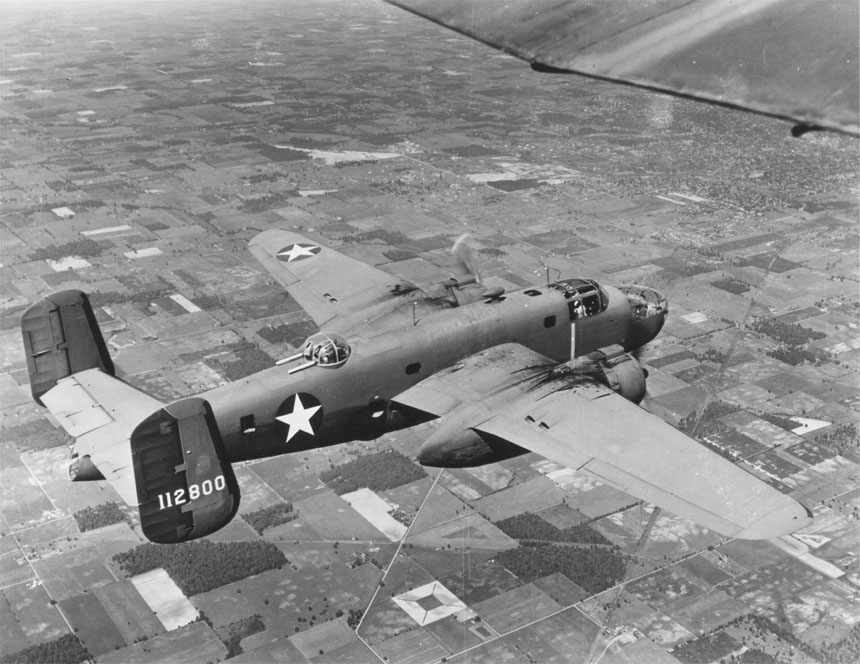
A twin-tailed B-25 Mitchell in flight

a twin-tailed A-10 flying

A twin tail is a type of vertical tail arrangement found on the empennage of some aircraft. Two vertical tails—often smaller individually than a single conventional vertical tail would be—are mounted at the outside of the aircraft's horizontal stabilizer. This arrangement is also known as an H-tail, as it resembles a capital "H" when viewed from the rear.

The twin tail was particularly used on a wide variety of World War II multi-engine designs that saw mass production, especially on the American B-24 Liberator and B-25 Mitchell bombers, the British Avro Lancaster and Handley Page Halifax heavy bombers, and the Soviet Union's Petlyakov Pe-2 attack bomber.

It can be easily confused for the similarly named twin-boom (or "double tail") arrangement, which has two separate tail-booms (typically parallel, extending aft from the wing or wing-mounted engines), rather than a single tail with twin stabilizers (a singular "twin tail" vs. two identical tails).

One variation on the twin tail is the triple tail, but the twin-boom arrangement can also be considered a variation of the twin tail.

== Design ==
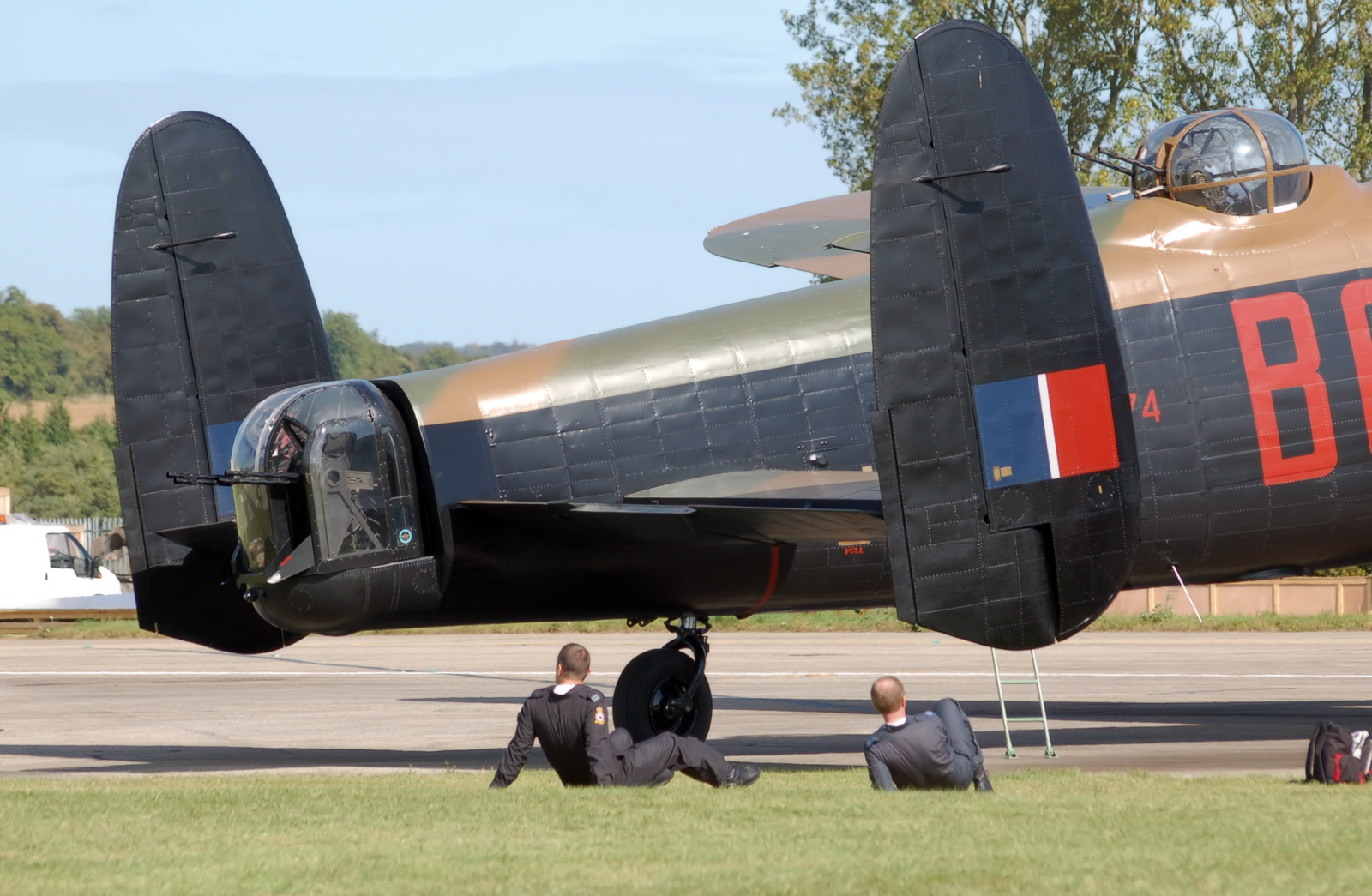
Twin tail of an Avro Lancaster

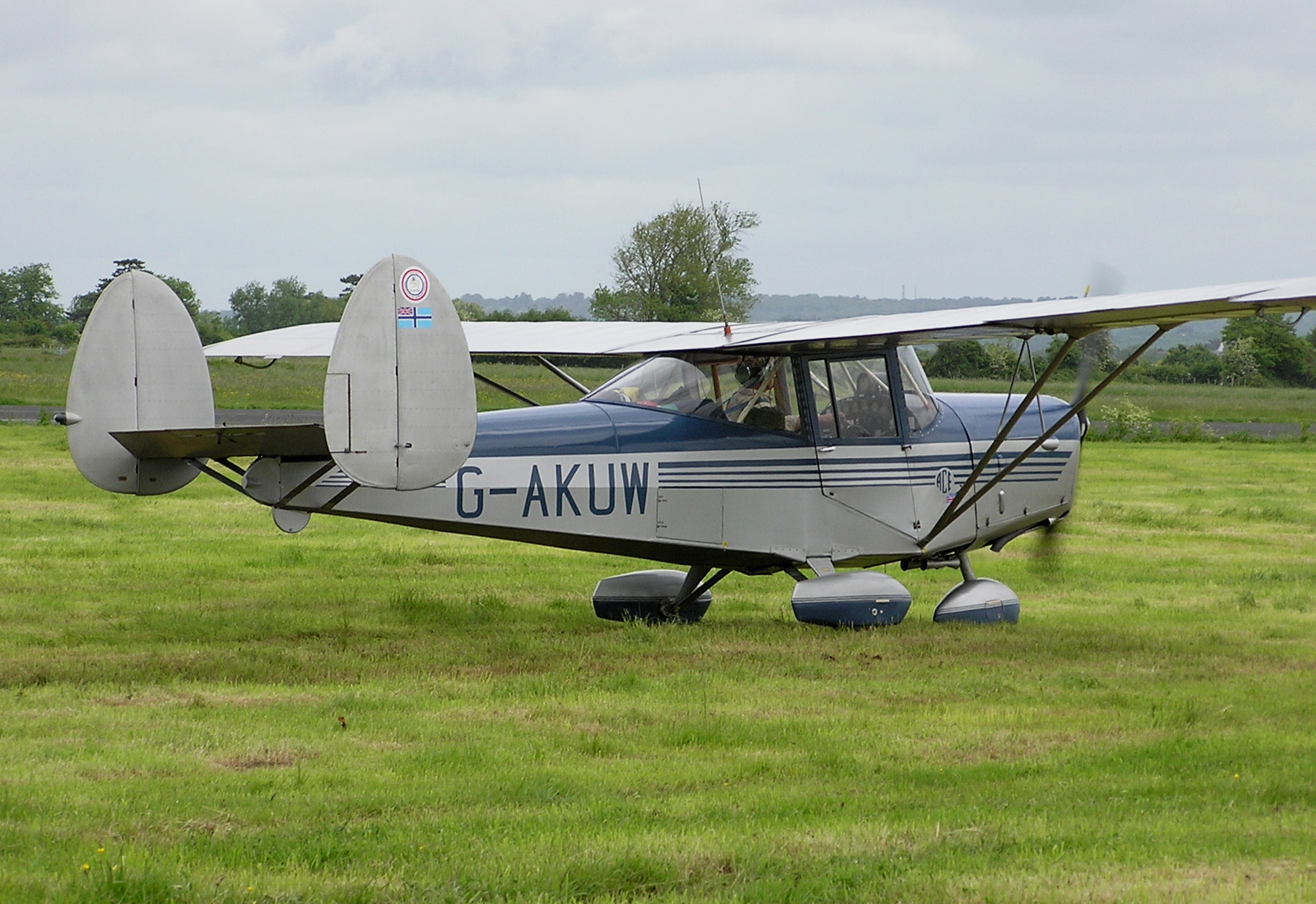
The twin tail of a Chrislea Super Ace, built in 1948

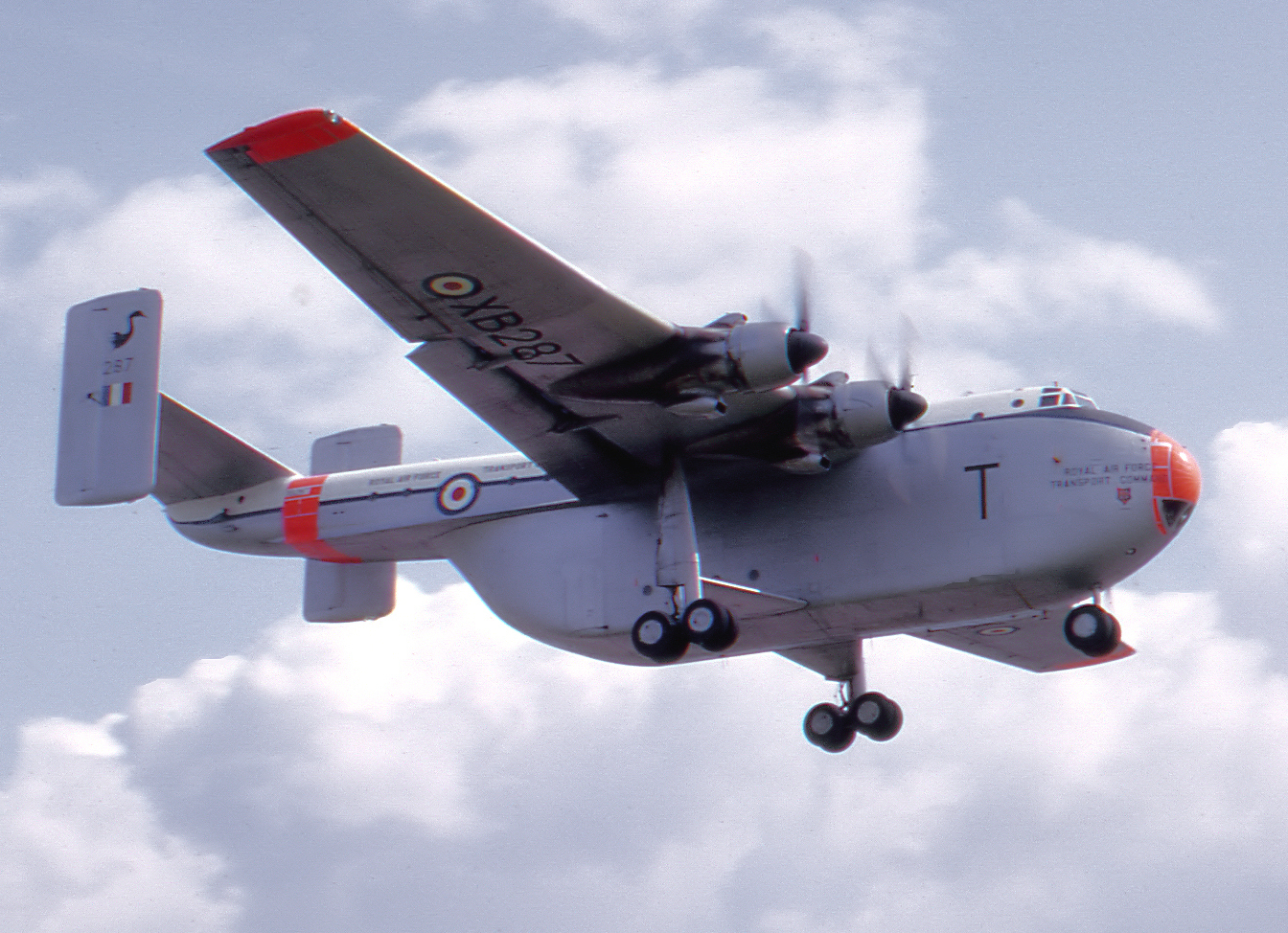
High-mounted twin tail of a Blackburn Beverley transport

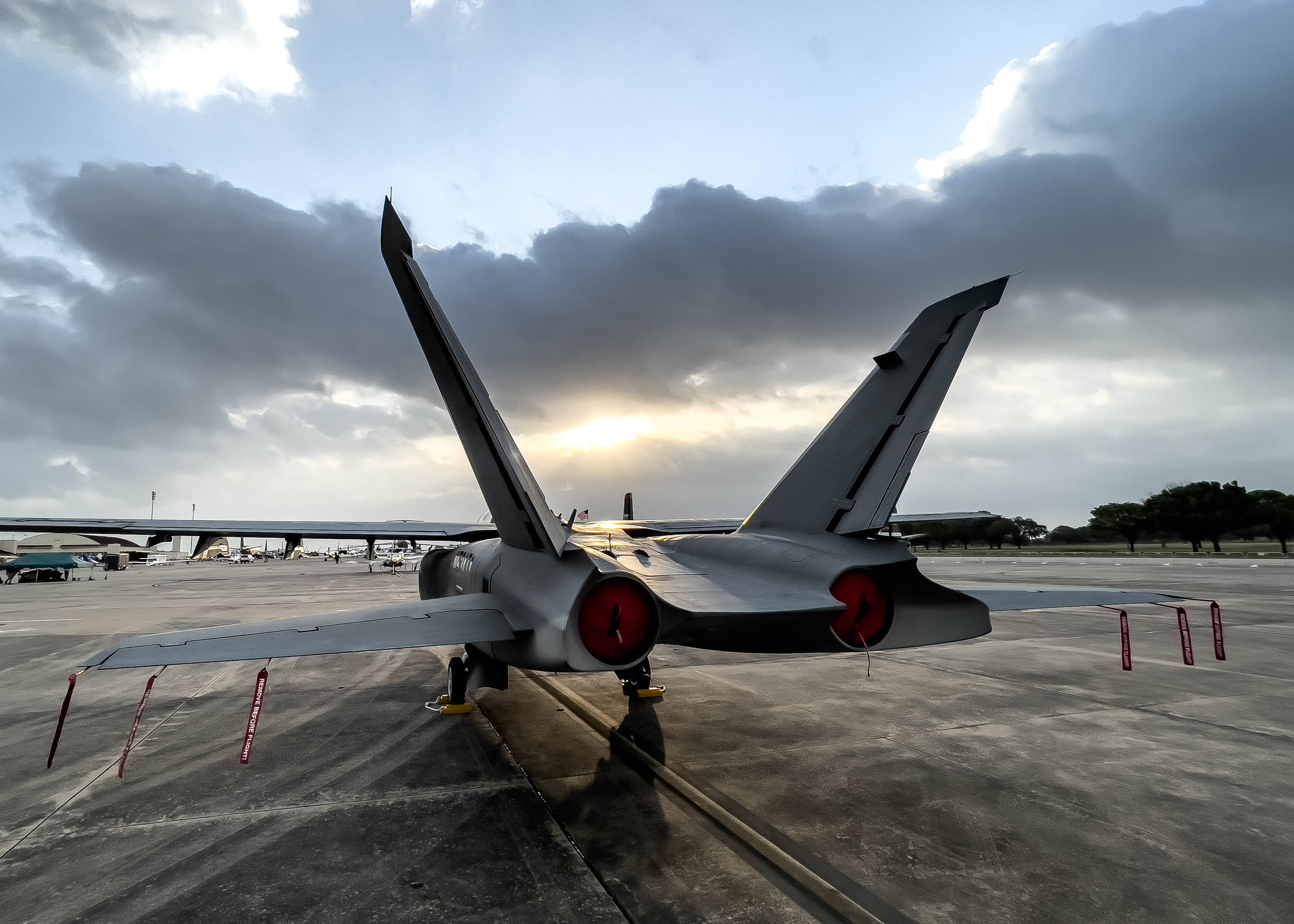
Twin tail of a Textron AirLand Scorpion ISR aircraft

Twin tails in an H-tail configuration are outboard of the turbulence created by the wider fuselage, improving stability and control especially at high angles of attack when the wider fuselage can interfere with airflow over the vertical tail.

Separating the control surfaces allows for additional rudder area or vertical surface without requiring a massive single tail. On multi-engine, propeller designs, twin fin and rudders operating in the propeller slipstreams give greater rudder authority and improved control at low airspeeds, and one-engine-out situations, and when taxiing. H-tails may sometimes provide "end plate effect" that improves the effectiveness of the horizontal tail. Conversely, a twin tail on a single engine aircraft places the rudders outside the slipstream. This design is employed on aircraft such as the ERCO Ercoupe to reduce the effect of p-factor on takeoff.

A twin tail can also simplify hangar requirements,

It also affords a degree of redundancy: if one tail is damaged, the other may remain functional.

Twin tails with canted fins (each having outward-leaning diehedral) lean outboard of the turbulence created by the wider fuselage. They can also contribute somewhat to aircraft lateral (pitch) control. Further the dihedral angle may reduce radar-reflection by the vertical tail, reducing aircraft detectability (desirable for combat aircraft).

Most often, the twin vertical surfaces are attached to the ends of the horizontal stabilizer, but a few aircraft, like the Armstrong Whitworth Whitley, Mitsubishi G3M and Dornier Do 19 bombers, had their twin vertical surfaces mounted to the upper surface of the fixed stabilizer instead, at some distance inwards from the horizontal stabilizer's tips.

Starting in the early 1970s, it became common to fit jet fighters and attack aircraft with twin tails that did not attach to the horizontal stabilizer, but instead projected upwards from the aft fuselage, often at a slightly outboard angle. Among the first notable examples were the MiG-25 Foxbat and Grumman F-14 Tomcat.

H-tails can, in some cases, conceal hot jet exhausts from infrared-guided weapons, as in the design of the Fairchild Republic A-10 Thunderbolt II attack jet.

However, twin tails are more complex to design, and tend to weigh more, than single-tail designs.

== Variations ==
Many canard aircraft designs incorporate twin tails on the tips of the main wing. Very occasionally, three or more tails are used, as on the Breguet Deux-Ponts, Lockheed Constellation and Boeing 314 Clipper. A very unusual design can be seen on the C-2 Greyhound and E-2 Hawkeye, which has two additional vertical tails fixed to the horizontal stabilizer between the normal vertical twin-tail surfaces. This arrangement was chosen for the stringent size limitations of carrier-based aircraft.

A special case of twin tail is the twin-boom tail or double tail, where the aft airframe consists of two separate fuselages, "tail booms", which each have a rudder but are usually connected by a single horizontal stabilizer. Examples of this construction are the twin-engined Lockheed P-38 Lightning; Northrop P-61 Black Widow; Focke-Wulf Fw 189; the single jet-engined de Havilland Vampire; cargo-carrying Fairchild C-119 Flying Boxcar and the little known Transavia PL-12 Airtruk.

== Notable twin-tail aircraft ==
While twin tails were common in early aircraft, such as the Wright Flyer and Farman MF.7, they usually only had rudders -- no vertical stabilizer. The modern use of twin tails emerged in the mid-to-late 1930s with planes like the Lockheed 12, Lockheed Electra, Beechcraft 18 and ERCO Ercoupe. Significant World War II military aircraft with twin tails include the Consolidated B-24 Liberator, Handley Page Halifax, Avro Lancaster, Messerschmitt Bf 110, and P-38 Lightning.

Many later fighter aircraft, like the Grumman F-14 Tomcat, McDonnell Douglas F-15 Eagle, Sukhoi Su-27, MiG-29, and Fairchild Republic A-10 Thunderbolt II, make use of twin tail configurations, as do civilian and cargo designs like the Antonov An-14, Antonov An-22, Antonov An-28, Antonov An-38, Antonov An-225, Beriev Be-12, Short 330, Rutan Long-EZ and SpaceShipOne.

The V-22 Osprey uses a twin tail arrangement.

== See also ==
- Cruciform tail
- Pelikan tail
- T-tail
- V-tail
