= Hirth Hi 25 Kria =

German single-seat glider, 1958

Hi-25 Kria

General information
- Type: Single seat experimental glider
- National origin: Germany
- Manufacturer: Wolf Hirth Gmbh, Nabern
- Number built: 1

History
- First flight: 31 December 1958

The experimental Hirth Hi-25 Kria was only the second glider constructed from glass reinforced plastic (GRP). Built in Germany in 1958, it was a single seat, 12 m (39.4 ft) span aircraft. Only one was built; it later flew for several years with Akaflieg Stuttgart.

== Design and development ==
The first glider with a GRP structure was the Akaflieg Stuttgart Phönix which flew in November 1957. Wolf Hirth had followed its construction with interest and had hoped to manufacture it. Instead, the Phönix was produced by Bölkow and Hirth built his own design, the Hi-25 Kria, using the construction methods developed for the Phönix. As well as their structural similarity, the Kria and the Phönix shared some aerodynamic features, particularly Eppler airfoils and fuselages which conformed to the upward flowing air ahead of the wings and downwash behind. The Kria, though, was a high wing rather than mid-wing monoplane, was smaller overall (the Phönix had a 16 m span) and had a butterfly tail. Kría is the Icelandic name for the Arctic tern.

The Kria's cantilever wing was straight tapered over all the span except for elliptical tips, with an unswept leading edge and a forward swept trailing edge. There was no dihedral. The wings carried short span ailerons at the tips and undersurface airbrakes, which could be extended at 90° to the airflow, inboard. The tail surfaces, separated by 110°, had swept leading edges and rounded tips.

The airflow-conforming aerodynamics of the fuselage gave it a rather humped back profile, with the dorsal line dropping away aft of the wing to a slender tail. Ahead of the wing the combined canopy-nose line was almost straight. A single piece canopy covered a cockpit which fitted only the smallest pilots. The underside of the forward fuselage was bulged and carried a close-fitting landing skid, which was assisted by an integral tail bumper.

The Kria was first flown on 31 December 1958, piloted by Rudi Lindner. It was pleasant to fly though rather lacking aileron response. Despite not being designed for serious competition, it performed better than any other 12 m (39.4 ft) span sailplane of its time.

== Operational history ==
After Hirth died in a flying accident in 1959 the Kria was donated to the Akaflieg Stuttgart. It flew from their Hahnweide base for several years, also participating in glider evaluation courses under OSTIV auspices. Stored after retirement, the sole Kria was lost in a hangar fire in 2001.

== Specifications ==
Data from Sailplanes 1945-1965

General characteristics

- Crew: 1
- Length: 6.85 m (22 ft 6 in)
- Wingspan: 11.90 m (39 ft 1 in)
- Wing area: 9.88 m^{2} (106.3 sq ft)
- Aspect ratio: 14.33
- Airfoil: Eppler STE 961-516
- Empty weight: 120 kg (265 lb)
- Gross weight: 220 kg (485 lb)

Performance

- Maximum glide ratio: 28.6 at 85 km/h (53 mph; 46 kn)
- Rate of sink: 0.78 m/s (154 ft/min) at 75 km/h (47 mph; 41 kn)
- Wing loading: 22.3 kg/m^{2} (4.6 lb/sq ft)
