= Akaflieg Stuttgart fs24 =

German single-seat glider, 1957

fs24 Phönix
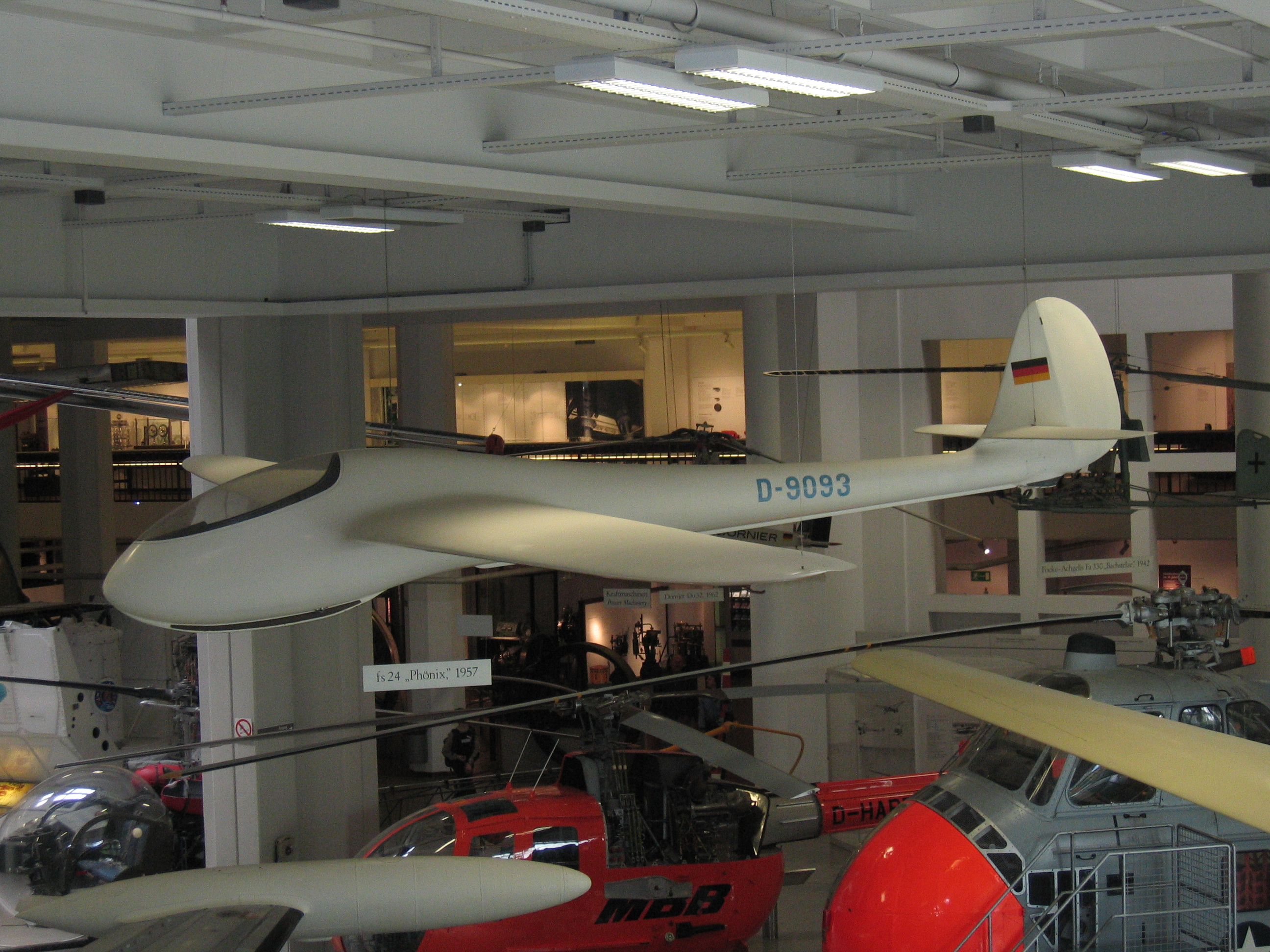
- fs24 in the Deutsches Museum in Munich

General information
- Type: Sailplane
- National origin: West Germany
- Manufacturer: Akaflieg Stuttgart
- Designer: Richard Eppler and Hermann Nägele
- Number built: 9

History
- First flight: 27 November 1957

The Akaflieg Stuttgart fs24, nicknamed Phönix (German: "Phoenix"), was a glider designed and built in West Germany from 1951.

== Design and development ==
The fs24 was the first glider to use fibreglass in its construction. The development of modern aerofoil sections for gliders required very accurate reproduction with smooth surfaces, using tolerances that were extremely difficult to achieve using conventional wood or metal construction, but could be achieved by using composite materials laid up in a mould.

The design of the fs24 was started at Akaflieg Stuttgart, (Akademische Fliegergruppe - academic flying group), by Richard Eppler and Hermann Nägele in 1951. Originally it was constructed of balsa wood with a strengthened outer layer of paper and glue layers, which proved unsatisfactory. The project was abandoned until a grant for further research was received from the state of Baden-Württemberg. By then glass fibre reinforced polyester resin was available and so it was redesigned using a balsa wood/glass fibre sandwich, with the load-bearing points and the edge of the cockpit canopy strengthened with plywood.

The first flight was made on 27 November 1957, and good performance and excellent handling were demonstrated, especially in weak thermal conditions. The prototype had a conventional tail unit and a bumper instead of a conventional undercarriage. Airbrakes were fitted on the underside of the wing trailing edges.

Bölkow built eight fs24s, designated Phönix T, differing in the use of a T-tail and retractable undercarriage.

== Variants ==
fs24 Phönix
16m sailplane certified in January 1959 and manufactured by Akademische Fliegergruppe Stuttgart
fs24 Phönix TO
16m sailplane with a T-tail certified in May 1960 and manufactured by Apparatebau Nabern.
fs24 Phönix T
16m sailplane certified in April 1961 and manufactured by Apparatebau Nabern.

== Surviving aircraft ==
The prototype fs24 Phönix is on display at the Deutsches Museum in Munich, Germany.

D-8353 is part of the collection of the Deutsches Segelflugmuseum at Wasserkuppe, Germany.

== Specifications ==
Data from The World's Sailplanes:Die Segelflugzeuge der Welt:Les Planeurs du Monde

General characteristics

- Crew: 1
- Length: 6.84 m (22 ft 5 in)
- Wingspan: 16 m (52 ft 6 in)
- Height: 0.95 m (3 ft 1 in)
- Wing area: 14.36 m^{2} (154.6 sq ft)
- Aspect ratio: 17.83
- Airfoil: EC 86 (-3) - 914
- Empty weight: 161.7 kg (356 lb)
- Max takeoff weight: 265 kg (584 lb)

Performance

- Stall speed: 43 km/h (27 mph, 23 kn)
- Never exceed speed: 140 km/h (87 mph, 76 kn)
- Rough air speed max: 100 km/h (62.1 mph; 54.0 kn)
- Aerotow speed: 100 km/h (62.1 mph; 54.0 kn)
- Winch launch speed: 90 km/h (55.9 mph; 48.6 kn)
- g limits: +4 -2
- Maximum glide ratio: ~37 at 77–80.2 km/h (47.8–49.8 mph; 41.6–43.3 kn)
- Rate of sink: 0.53 m/s (104 ft/min) at 69.2 km/h (43.0 mph; 37.4 kn)
- Wing loading: 18.5 kg/m^{2} (3.8 lb/sq ft)

== See also ==
Aircraft of comparable role, configuration, and era

- Hirth Hi25 Kria

Related lists

- List of gliders
