= Cruciform tail =

Aircraft tail configuration

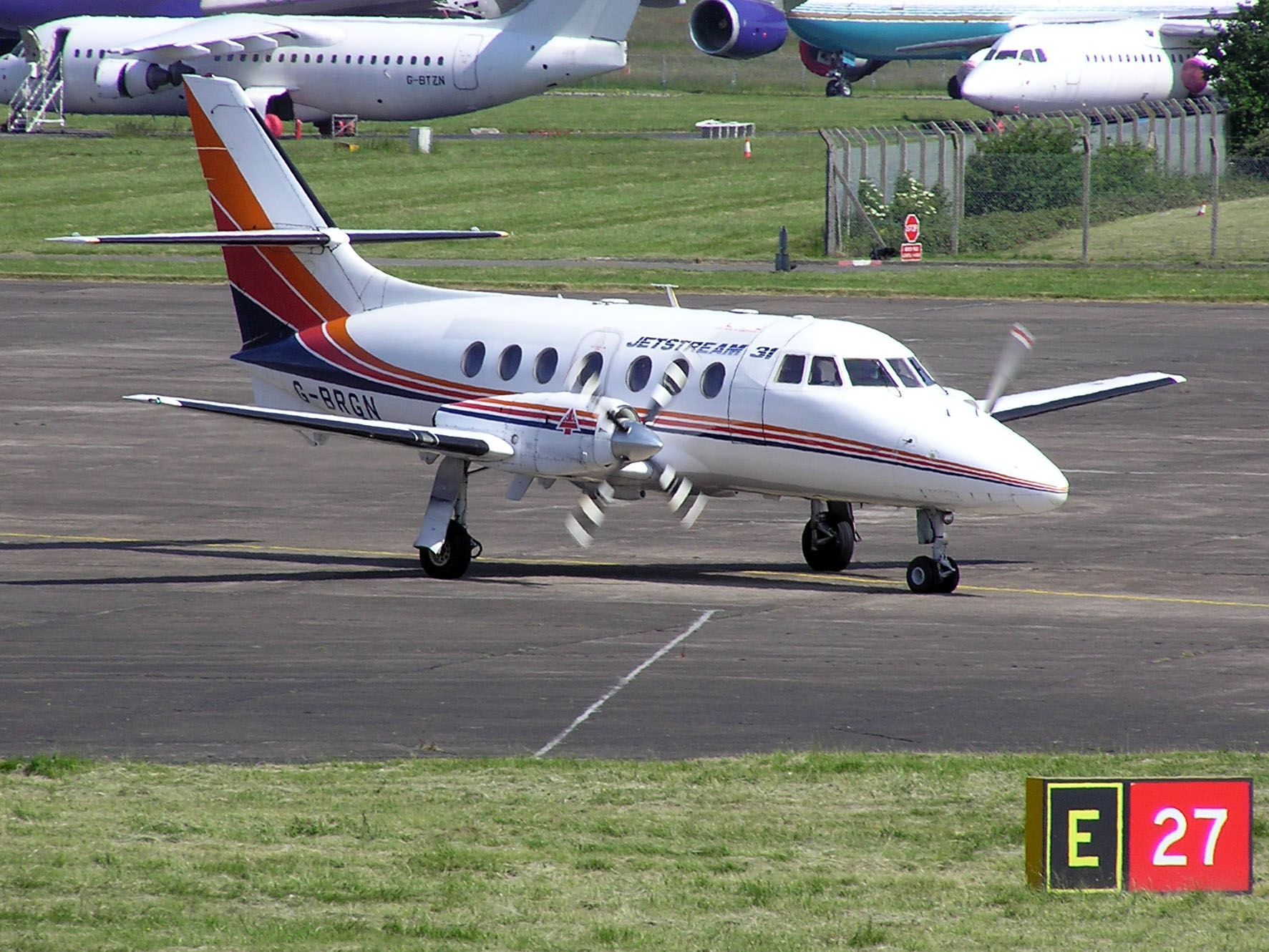
British Aerospace Jetstream 31 with cruciform tail

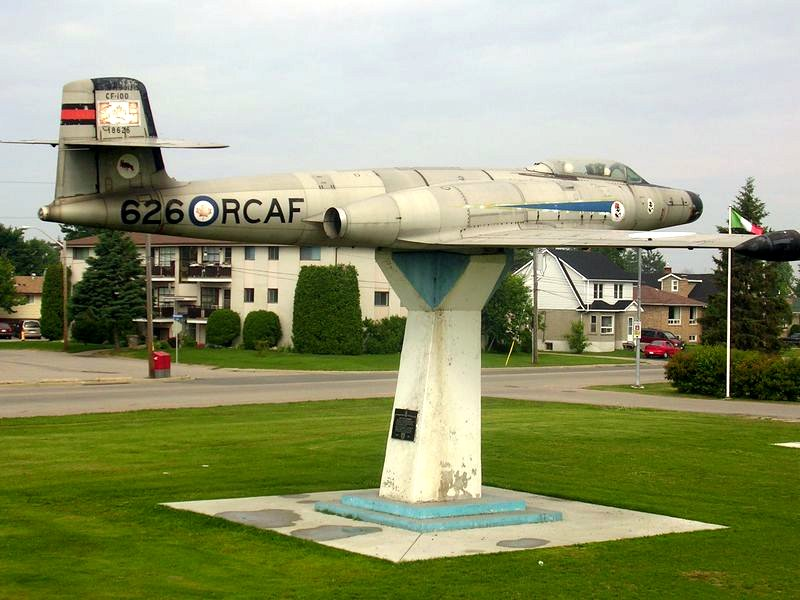
Avro Canada CF-100 Canuck showing its cruciform design tail

The cruciform tail is an aircraft empennage configuration which, when viewed from the aircraft's front or rear, looks much like a cross. The usual arrangement is to have the horizontal stabilizer intersect the vertical tail somewhere near the middle, and above the top of the fuselage. The design is often used to locate the horizontal stabilizer away from jet exhaust, propeller and wing wake, as well as to provide undisturbed airflow to the rudder.

Prominent examples of aircraft with cruciform tails include the Avro Canada CF-100 Canuck, the British Aerospace Jetstream 31, the MiG-15, the Fairchild Swearingen Metroliner, and the Rockwell B-1 Lancer.

== See also ==
- Pelikan tail
- T-tail
- Twin tail
- V-tail
