= Akaflieg Braunschweig SB-10 Schirokko =

German two-seat glider, 1972

SB-10 Schirokko
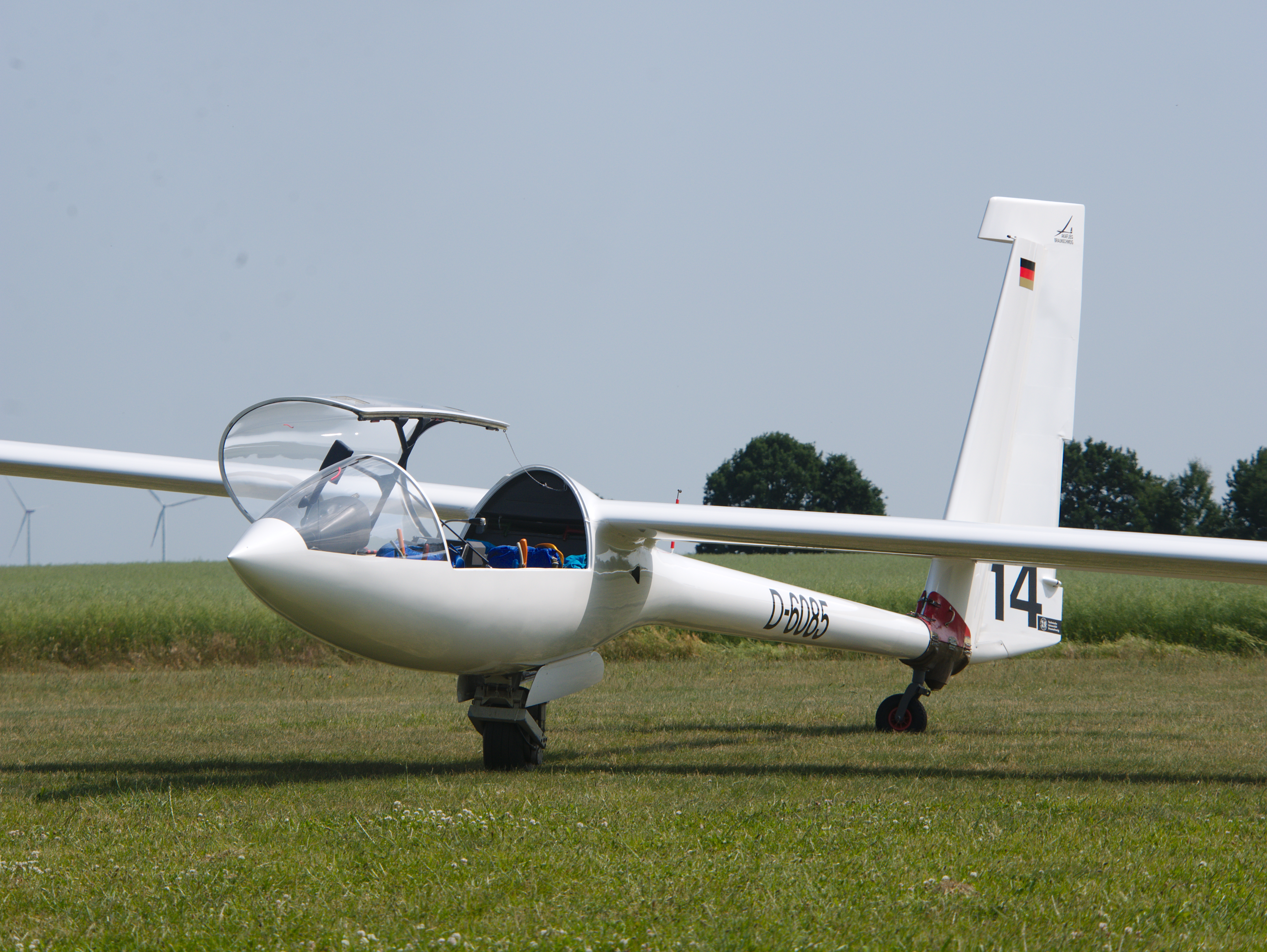

General information
- Type: Two-seat high performance sailplane
- National origin: West Germany
- Manufacturer: Akaflieg Braunschweig
- Number built: 1

History
- Manufactured: no
- First flight: 22 July 1972

The Akaflieg Braunschweig SB-10 Schirokko is a German two-seat high performance sailplane designed and built by students of Brunswick University. The sailplane was not intended for production.

== Design ==
The SB-10 is a cantilever shoulder-wing monoplane with a steel-tube structure fuselage and it used the wings from the earlier SB-9 Stratus. The two crew sit in tandem in an enclosed cockpit with a Plexiglas canopy, and it is fitted with dual instrumentation. The landing gear is a sprung retractable monowheel with a tail bumper. The wingtips are interchangeable and two types can be fitted to give a 26m or 29m span. The wing center section, its main spar and wing shells of 8m length were built using carbon fiber, a first in civil aircraft structure manufacturing.

== Specifications (with 29m wing) ==
Data from Jane's All the World's Aircraft 1973-74

General characteristics

- Crew: 2
- Length: 10.36 m (33 ft 11.75 in)
- Wingspan: 29.00 m (95 ft 1.75 in)
- Height: 2.50 m (8 ft 2.5 in)
- Wing area: 22.95 m^{2} (247 sq ft)
- Aspect ratio: 36.6
- Empty weight: 577 kg (1,272 lb)
- Gross weight: 897 kg (1,977 lb)

Performance

- Maximum speed: 200 km/h (124 mph, 108 kn)
- Stall speed: 65 km/h (40 mph, 35 kn)
- g limits: +5.3
- Maximum glide ratio: 53
- Rate of sink: 0.41 m/s (81 ft/min)

== See also ==
Related lists

- List of gliders
