= Akaflieg München Mü27 =

German prototype research glider, 1979

Mü-27
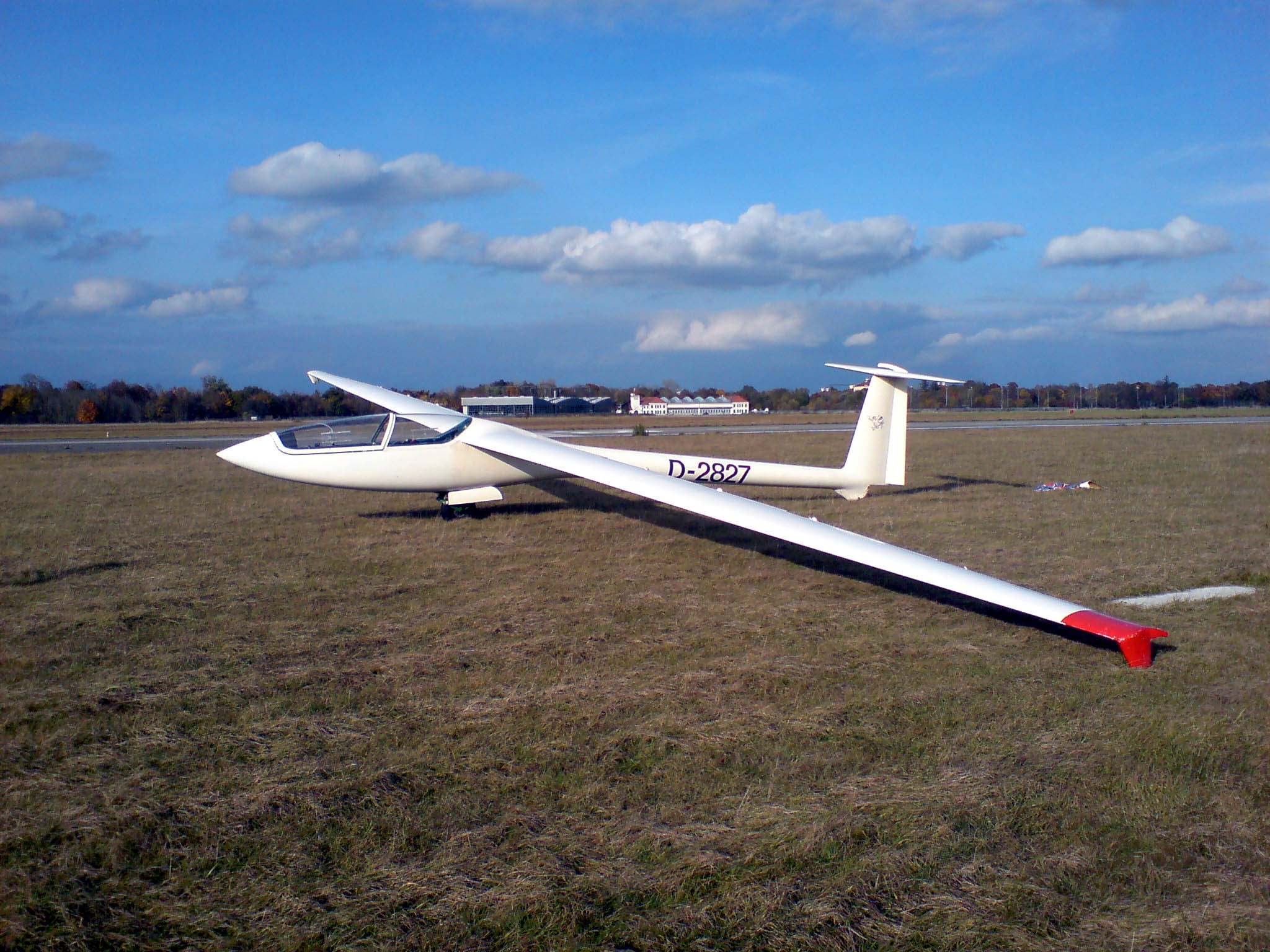

General information
- Type: Glider aircraft
- National origin: Germany
- Manufacturer: Akaflieg München
- Number built: 2

History
- First flight: 24 February 1979

The Mü-27 is a research glider aircraft that designed and built in Germany in 1979. Only one example was constructed.

== Development ==
Germany had established Akademische Fliegergruppe at several universities after World War I. The first and lead group was established in Berlin, but one of the most prolific, up to World War II, was Akaflieg München, and design activities continued after World War II.

The Akaflieg München Mü-27 is a two-seat research aircraft intended to explore the performance characteristics of slotted Fowler flaps when used on a high-performance Sailplane. The Mü-27 is a large glider. The empennage and fuselage are constructed of glassfibre re-inforced plastic with conticell foam sandwich cores throughout. The wings have aluminium alloy spars and webs.

The full-span slotted flaps/ailerons extend and retract in and out of the wing trailing edge, increasing the area of the wings by up to 36%. A tall retractable undercarriage and a T-tail reduce the risk of damage during field landings and reduce drag when in flight. Flight trials commenced at Oberpfaffenhofen airfield with Thomas Fischer at the controls.

== Specifications (Mü-27) ==
Data from Coates, Andrew. “Jane's World Sailplanes & Motor Gliders new edition”. London, Jane's. 1980. ISBN 0-7106-0017-8

General characteristics

- Crew: 1 pilot
- Capacity: 1 passenger
- Length: 10.3 m (33 ft 10 in)
- Wingspan: 22 m (72 ft 2 in)
- Height: 1.8 m (5 ft 11 in)
- Wing area: 17.6–23.9 m^{2} (189–257 sq ft)
- Aspect ratio: 27.5 - 20.3
- Airfoil: Wortmann FX-67-VC-170/136
- Empty weight: 480 kg (1,058 lb)
- Gross weight: 700 kg (1,543 lb)

Performance

- Maximum speed: 280 km/h (174 mph, 151 kn)
- Maximum glide ratio: 47 at 101 km/h (55 kn)
- Rate of sink: 0.56 m/s (110 ft/min)

== See also ==
- List of gliders
