= V-tail =

Aircraft tail that incorporates rudder and elevators in a V shape

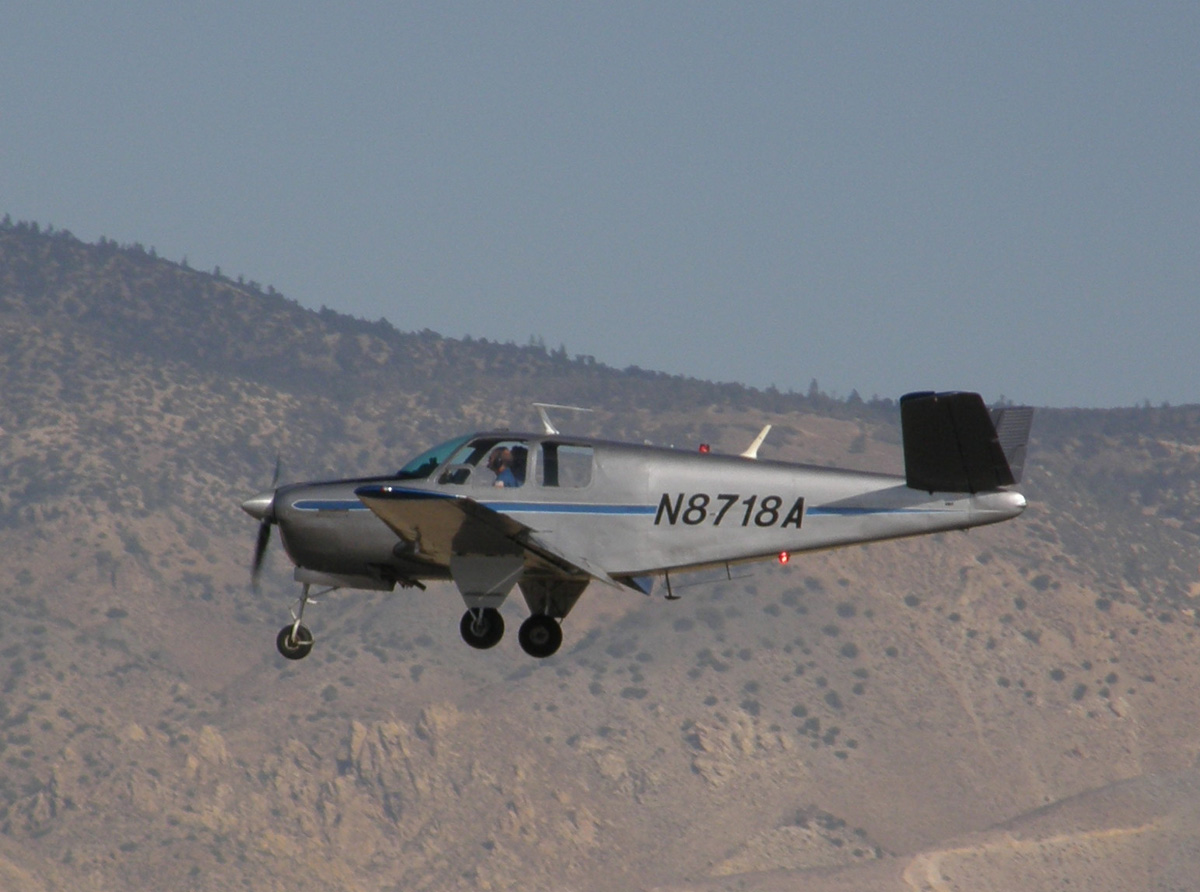
1950 V-tailed B35 still operated by the National Test Pilot School at the Mojave Air and Space Port

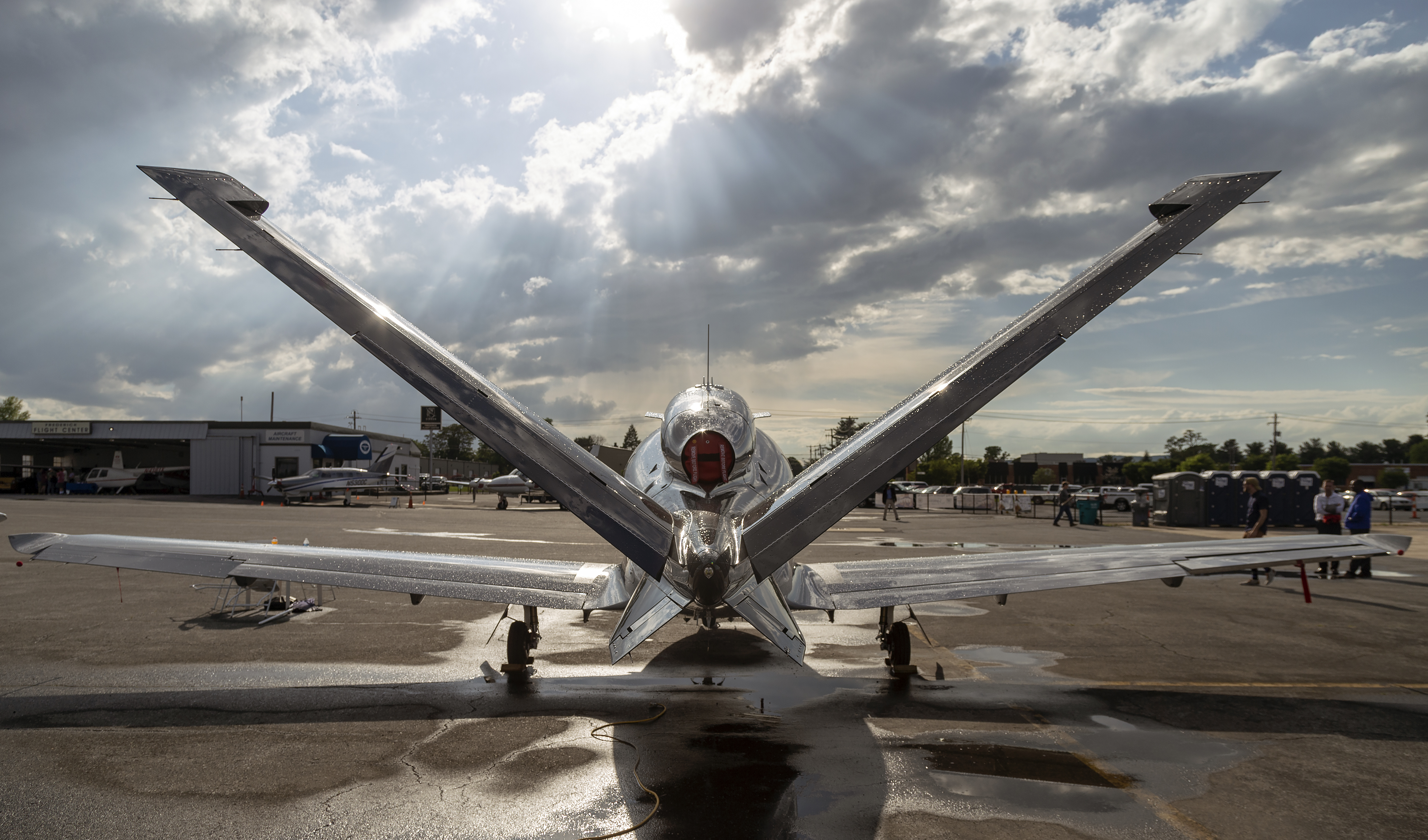
Rear view of the Cirrus Vision SF50's V-tail and engine outlet

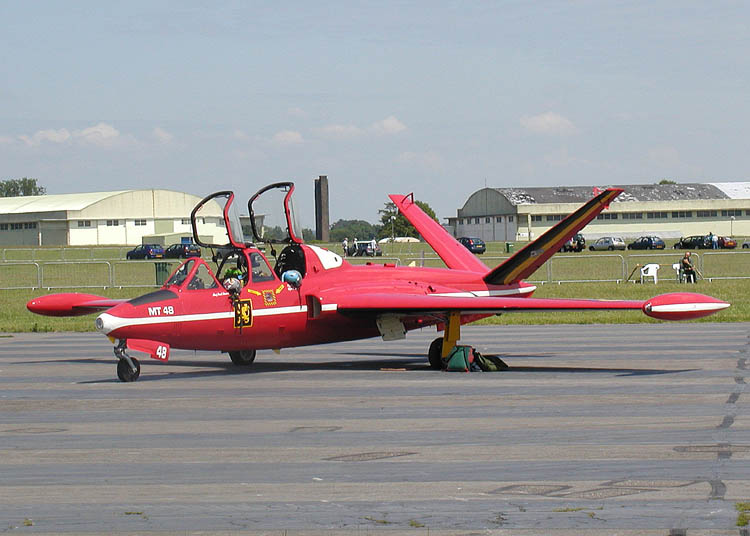
The V-tail of a Belgian Air Force Fouga CM.170 Magister

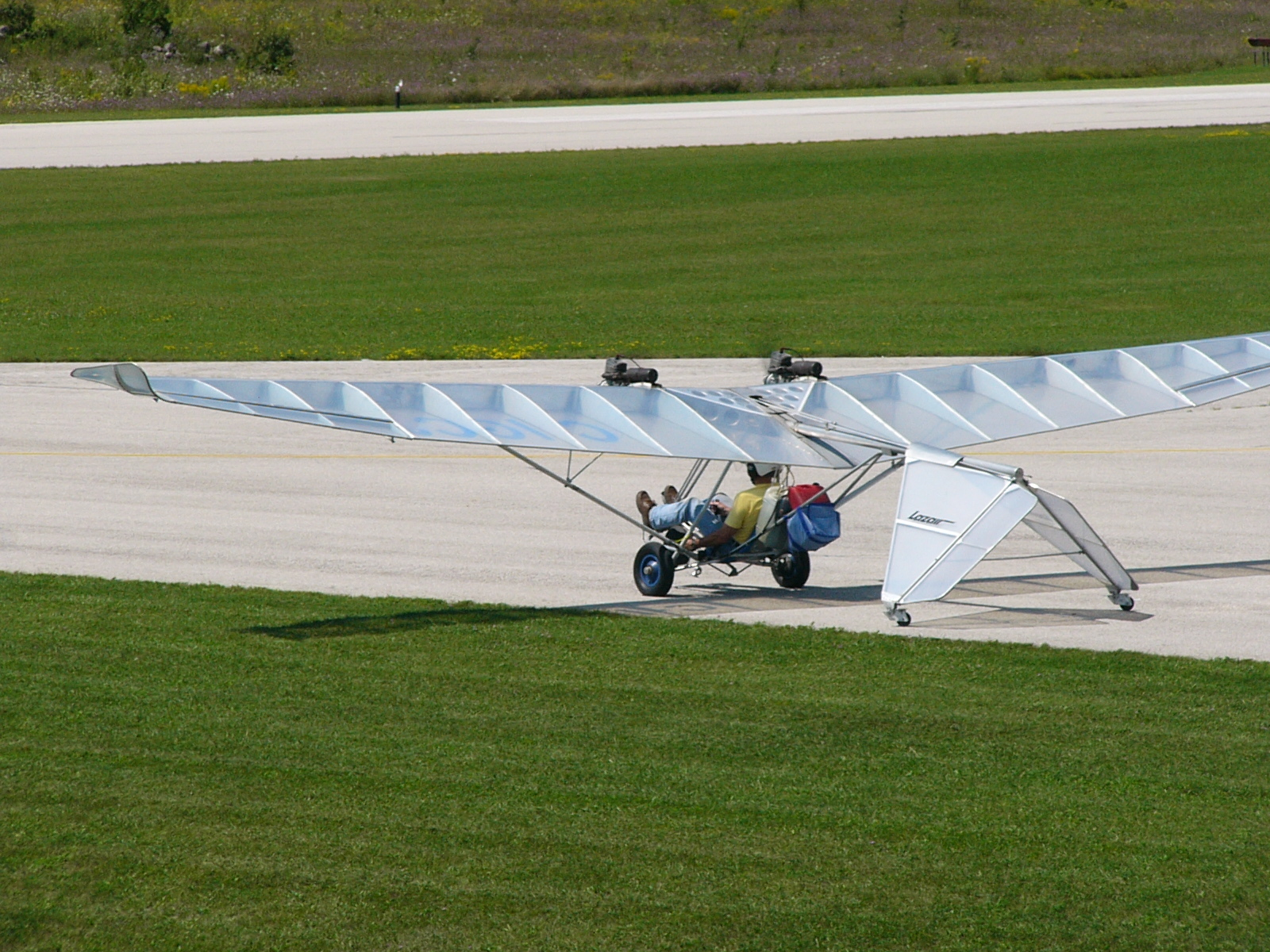
An Ultraflight Lazair showing its inverted V-tail covered with translucent Tedlar

The V-tail or vee-tail (sometimes called a butterfly tail or Rudlicki's V-tail) of an aircraft is an unconventional arrangement of the tail control surfaces that replaces the traditional vertical and horizontal surfaces with two surfaces set in a V-shaped configuration. It is not widely used in aircraft design. The aft edge of each twin surface is a hinged control surface called a ruddervator, which combines the functions of both a rudder and elevator.

== History ==
The V-tail was invented in 1930 by Polish engineer Jerzy Rudlicki and was tested for the first time on a Hanriot HD.28 trainer, modified by Polish aerospace manufacturer Plage and Laśkiewicz in the summer of 1931.

== Variants ==
The X-shaped tail surfaces of the experimental Lockheed XFV were essentially a V tail that extended both above and below the fuselage.

=== Conventional ===
The most popular conventionally V-tailed aircraft that has been mass-produced is the Beechcraft Bonanza Model 35, often known as the V-tail Bonanza or simply V-Tail. Other examples include the Lockheed F-117 Nighthawk stealth attack aircraft and the Fouga CM.170 Magister trainer. The Cirrus Vision SF50 jet is a recent example of a civilian aircraft adopting the V-tail. Some gliders, like the Lehtovaara PIK-16 Vasama, were designed with a V-tail, but the production Vasamas had a cruciform tail.

=== Inverted ===
The Blohm & Voss P 213 Miniaturjäger was one of the first aircraft to have an inverted V-tail. Unmanned aerial vehicles such as the LSI Amber, General Atomics Gnat and General Atomics MQ-1 Predator would later feature this type of tail. In pusher UAVs, with propeller at the back, downward tail fins can provide yaw stability without interfering with the propeller. The Ultraflight Lazair ultralights, of which over 2,000 were produced, featured an inverted V-tail, which also carried the rear landing gear.

=== Y-tail ===
The inferior compensation of yaw of the V tail compared to a conventional tail can be ameliorated by installing a vertical fin under the fuselage.Such installation is known as Y-tail as it resembles a capital 'Y' viewed from behind. The ventral fin can also contain a rudder. The fin also aids on spin recovery, and can provide an installation point for a tailwheel, and protection for the propeller if the aircraft is of pusher configuration. Y-tail empennage has been used on LearAvia Lear Fan, Waiex and Monnett Moni. McDonnell Douglas F-4 Phantom II has an inverted Y tail.

== Advantages ==
Ideally, with fewer surfaces than a conventional three-aerofoil tail or a T-tail, the V-tail is lighter and has less wetted surface area, so thus produces less induced and parasitic drag. However, NACA studies indicated that the V-tail surfaces must be larger than simple projection into the vertical and horizontal planes would suggest, such that total wetted area is roughly constant; reduction of intersection surfaces from three to two does, however, produce a net reduction in drag through elimination of some interference drag.

Light jet aircraft such as the Cirrus Vision SF50, the Eclipse 400, the Sonex SubSonex or larger jet aircraft, such as the Northrop Grumman RQ-4 Global Hawk unmanned aerial drone often have the power plant placed outside the aircraft. In such cases V-tails are used to avoid placing the vertical stabilizer in the exhaust of the engine, which would disrupt the flow of the exhaust, reducing thrust and increasing wear on the stabilizer, possibly leading to damage over time.

In military aircraft, V-tails reduce the number of right angles on an aircraft, improving its stealth characteristics.

V-tailed aircraft are safer to bail out than aircraft with conventional empennage as there is less risk to hit the tail.

== Disadvantages ==
In the mid-1980s, the Federal Aviation Administration re-assessed the V-tailed Beechcraft Bonanza due to safety concerns. While the Bonanza met the initial certification requirements, it had a history of fatal mid-air breakups during extreme stress, at a rate exceeding the accepted norm. The type was deemed airworthy and restrictions removed after Beechcraft issued a structural modification as an Airworthiness Directive.

V-tailed aircraft are more sensitive to tail heaviness and wrong loading than those with conventinal tails, and can easily go to flat spin if loaded wrong.

The rudder and elevator forces needed to move the control surfaces are greater on V-tail than on conventional empennage or T-tailed aircraft because of the angle on which the empennage has been installed. If the V angle is 45 degrees, the force needed is 1.41 times greater (square root of 2) compared to conventional or T-tail aircraft.

V-tailed aircraft can be harder to recover from spin than similar aircraft with conventional tail (Beechcraft Bonanza and PIK-16 Vasama as examples). This is why Fouga CM.170 Magister has a long, shallow "keel" under the tail to improve the spin recovery characteristics.

V-tailed aircraft require longer rear fuselages than aircraft with conventional empennages to prevent yawing. This tendency, called "snaking", was apparent on taking off and landing on the Fouga CM.170 Magister, which has a relatively short fuselage.

== Ruddervators ==
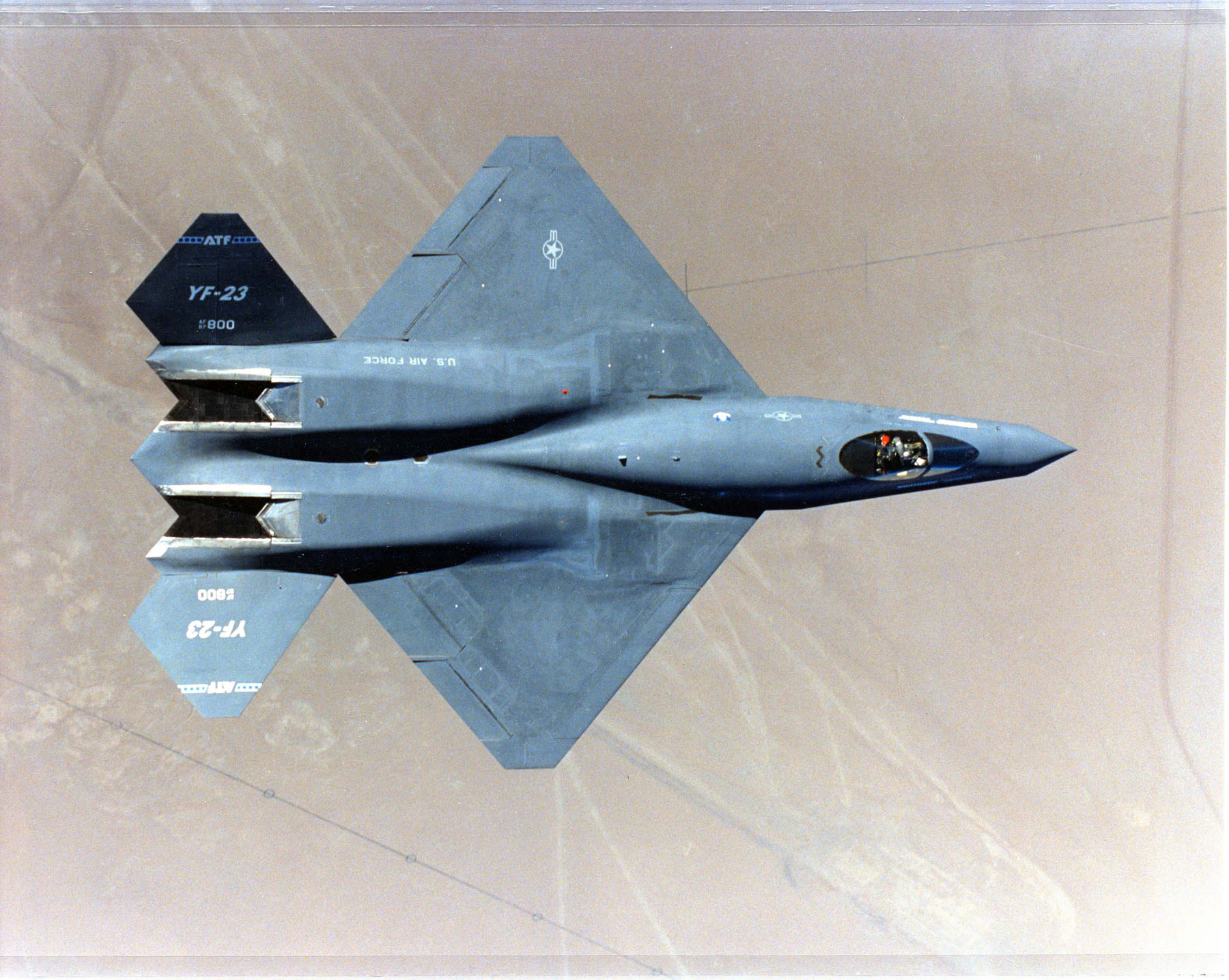
A top-down view of the Northrop YF-23 Gray Ghost prototype fighter jet, showing its distinctive wide V-tail and ruddervators

Ruddervators are the control surfaces on an airplane with a V-tail configuration. They are located at the trailing edge of each of the two airfoils making up the tail of the plane. The first use of ruddervators may have been on the Coandă-1910's X-tail, although there is no proof that the aircraft ever flew. The later Coandă-1911 flew with ruddervators on its X-tail. Later Polish engineer Jerzy Rudlicki designed the first practical ruddervators in 1930, tested on a modified Hanriot HD.28 trainer in 1931.

The name is a portmanteau of "rudder" and "elevator." In a conventional aircraft tail configuration, the rudder provides yaw (horizontal) control and the elevator provides pitch (vertical) control.

Ruddervators provide the same control effect as conventional control surfaces, but through a more complex control system that actuates the control surfaces in unison. Yaw moving the nose to the left is produced on an upright V tail by moving the pedals left which deflects the left-hand ruddervator down and left and the right-hand ruddervator up and left. The opposite produces yaw to the right. Pitch nose up is produced by moving the control column or stick back which deflects the left-hand ruddervator up and right and the right-hand ruddervator up and left. Pitch nose down is produced by moving the control column or stick forward which induces the opposite ruddervator movements.

== See also ==
- Cruciform tail
- Pelikan tail
- T-tail
- Twin tail
