= T-tail =

Aircraft empennage configuration

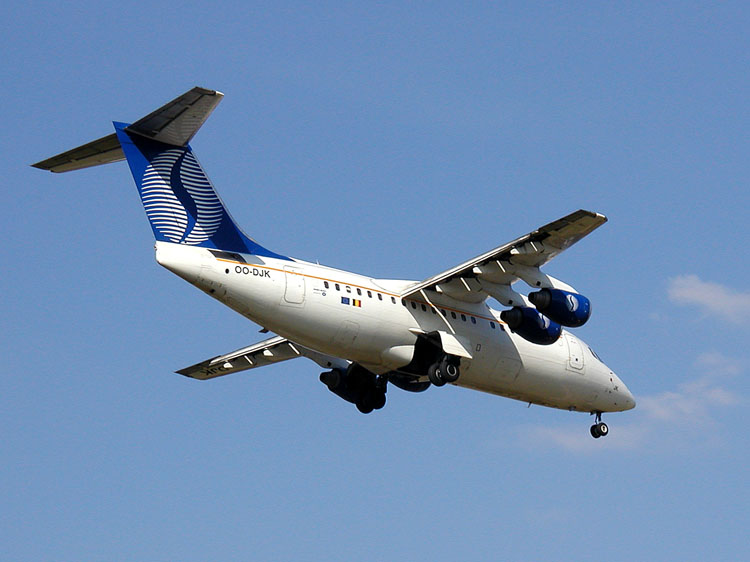
Avro RJ-85 of SN Brussels Airlines (Belgium)

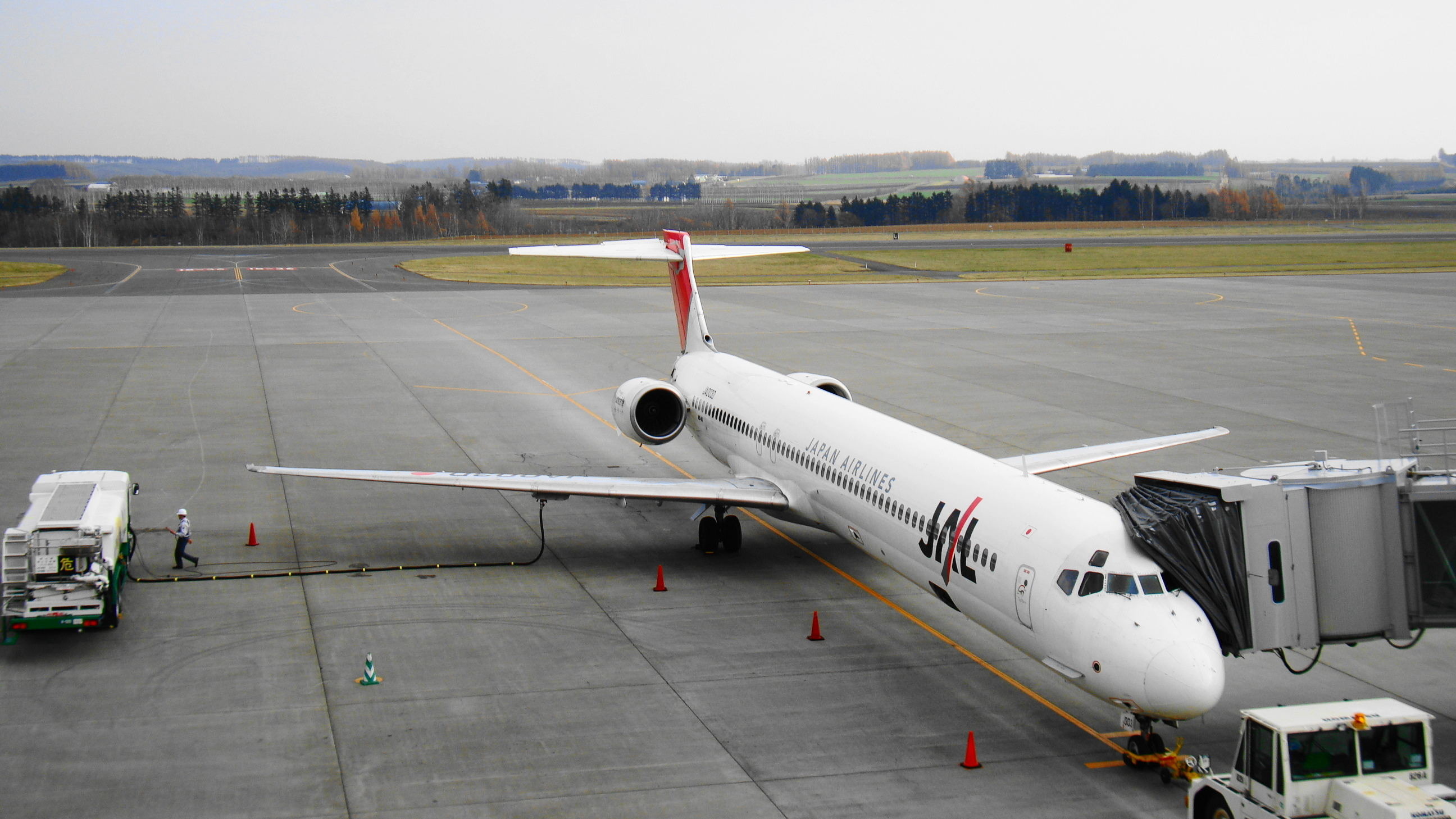
McDonnell Douglas MD-90

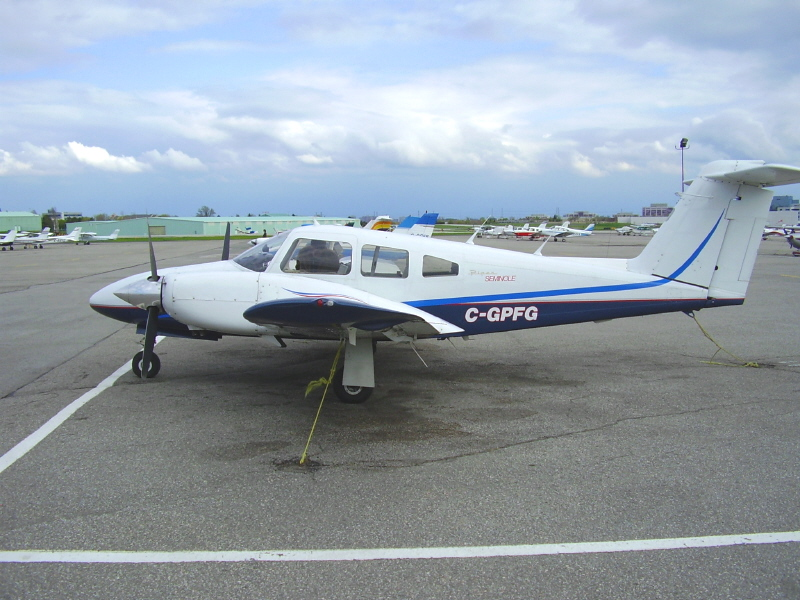
Piper PA-44-180 Seminole

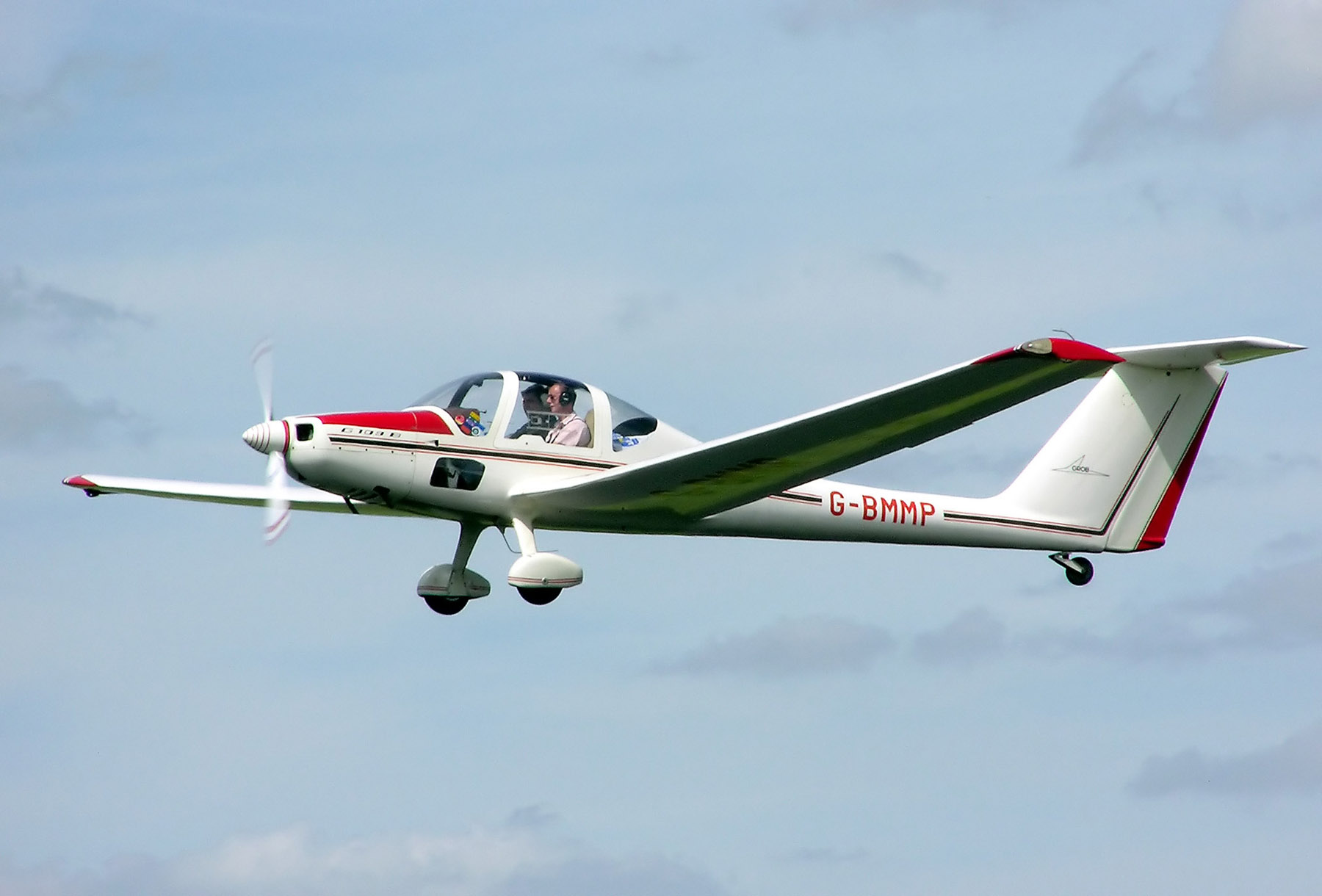
Grob G 109 motor glider

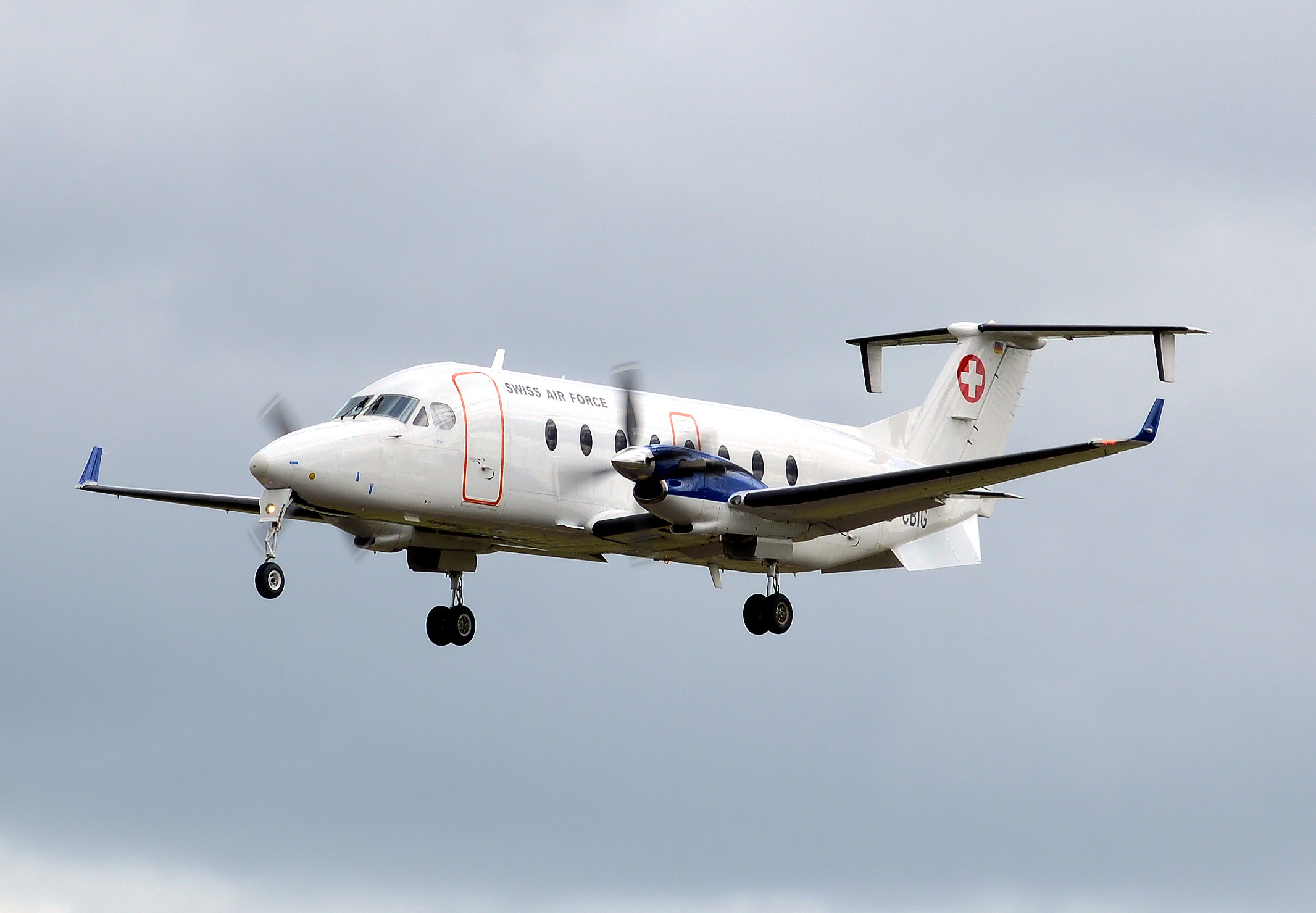
Beechcraft 1900D of the Swiss Air Force

T-tail of aircraft (Tu-154)

A T-tail is an empennage configuration in which the tailplane of an aircraft is mounted to the top of the fin. The arrangement looks like the capital letter T, hence the name. The T-tail differs from the standard configuration in which the tailplane is mounted to the fuselage at the base of the fin.

== Advantages ==
T-tails were common in early jet aircraft. Designers were worried that an engine failure would otherwise damage the horizontal tail.

The T-tail is very common on aircraft with engines mounted in nacelles on a high-winged aircraft or on aircraft with the engines mounted on the rear of the fuselage, as it keeps the tail clear of the jet exhaust. Rear-mounting the engines keeps the wings clean and improves short-field performance. This was necessary in early jet aircraft with less powerful engines.

T-tail aircraft can have better short-field performance, such as on the Avro RJ-85. The disturbed airflow over a lower stabilizer can make control more difficult at lower speeds.

During normal flying conditions, the tailplane of a T-tail is out of the disturbed airflow behind the wing and fuselage, which provides for more consistent elevator response.

The design and structure of a T-tail can be simpler.

For a transsonic aircraft a T-tail configuration may improve pitch control effectiveness, because the elevator is not in disturbed air behind the fuselage, particularly at moderate angles of attack.

Depending on wing location, the elevator may remain in undisturbed airflow during a stall. (However, T-tail aircraft may be vulnerable to deep stall, see Disadvantages below.)

An aircraft with a T-tail may be easier to recover from a spin, as the elevator is not in a position to block airflow over the rudder, which would make it ineffective, as can happen if the horizontal tail is directly below the fin and rudder.

The T-tail increases the effectiveness of the vertical tail because of "end plate" effect. The horizontal stabilizer acts like a winglet, reducing induced drag of the rudder. Smaller and lighter T-tails are often used on modern gliders.

When the vertical tail is swept, the horizontal tail can be made smaller because it is further rearwards and therefore has a greater lever arm. Tail sweep may be necessary at high Mach numbers.

A T-tail may have less interference drag, such as on the Tupolev Tu-154.

T-tails may be used to increase clearance at the rear of a cargo aircraft such as the Boeing C-17 Globemaster, to provide extra clearance when loading the aircraft.

T-tails decrease the possibility of anything hitting the empennage on paratroop or airdrop operations, as the tail is far above the jump door.

== Disadvantages ==
The aircraft may be prone to deep stall ("super stall") at high angles of attack, when airflow over the tailplane and elevators is blanked by the wings. The American McDonnell F-101 Voodoo jet fighter suffered from this problem, as did the British Gloster Javelin, Hawker Siddeley Trident and BAC One-Eleven. A stick-pusher can be fitted to deal with this problem.

For propeller aircraft, a T-tail configuration may reduce pitch control effectiveness if the elevators are outside the propeller slipstream.

The vertical stabilizer must be made stronger (and therefore heavier) to support the weight of the tailplane. (However other factors may make the T-tail smaller and lighter, see Advantages above.)

A T-tail produces a strong nose-down pitching moment in sideslip.

T-tails can cause aeroelastic flutter, as seen on the Lockheed C-141 Starlifter. The fuselage must be made stiffer to counteract this.

Many large aircraft can have the fin and rudder fold to reduce height in hangars, however this generally isn't feasible or useful if there is a T-tail.

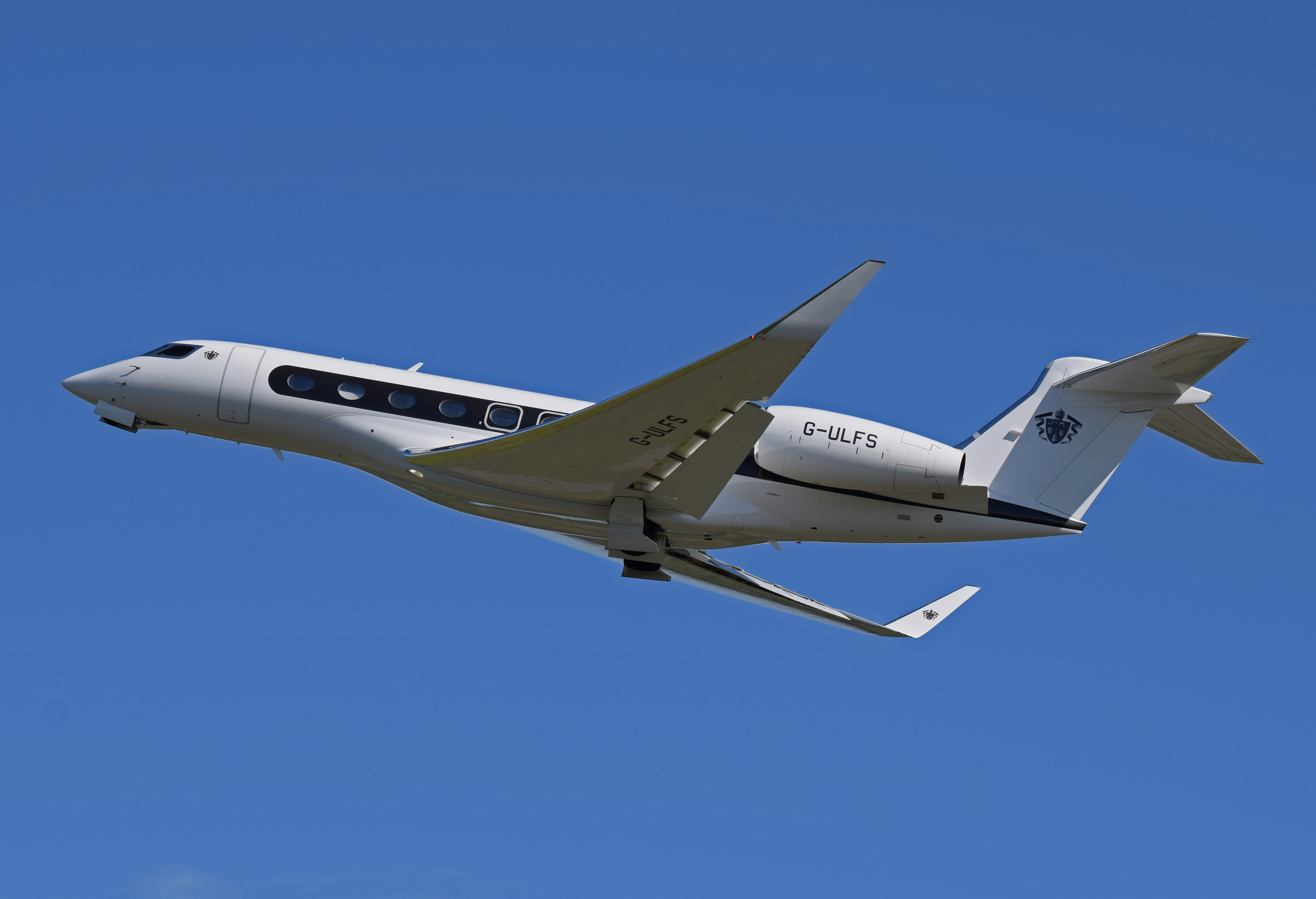
Gulfstream G650 with a T-tail and rear-engines

The T-tail configuration can also cause maintenance problems. The control runs to the elevators are more complex, and the surfaces are more difficult to inspect from the ground. The loss of Alaska Airlines Flight 261 was attributed to improper maintenance of the T-tail. T-tails can be harder to inspect or maintain, due to their height.

== Adoption ==
The T-tail can often be found on military transport aircraft, such as the Airbus A400M, the Boeing C-17 Globemaster III and the Embraer C-390 Millenium. It was used in the 1950s by combat aircraft such as the Gloster Javelin, McDonnell F-101 Voodoo, and Lockheed F-104 Starfighter interceptors, and on the Blackburn Buccaneer attack aircraft.

T-tails are often used on regional airliners and business aircraft, especially when rear-fuselage-mounted turbofan engines are used.

In the 1960s, T-tails were used on the BAC One-Eleven, Vickers VC10, McDonnell Douglas DC-9, Boeing 727, Fokker F28 Fellowship, Ilyushin Il-62 and Tupolev Tu-154. It has been used by the Gulfstream family since the Grumman Gulfstream II. It has been used by the Learjet family since their first aircraft, the Learjet 23. It has also been used by the Embraer's Phenom 100, Phenom 300 and Legacy/Praetor business jet families.

In the 1970s, it was used on the McDonnell Douglas MD-80 and Ilyushin Il-76, as well as the twin turboprop Beechcraft Super King Air. In the 1980s it was used on the Fokker 100 and the British Aerospace 146.

In the 1990s, it was used on the Boeing 717, Bombardier CRJ-Series, Embraer ERJ family, Fokker 70 and McDonnell Douglas MD-90, as well as the single turboprop Pilatus PC-12.

T-tail is especially popular on modern gliders because of the high performance, the safety it provides from accidental spins, and the safety it provides the stabilizer and elevator from foreign object damage on take-off and landing.

== See also ==
- Cruciform tail
- Pelikan tail
- Twin tail
- V-tail
- Hans Multhopp, a pioneer user of the T-Tail concept near World War II's end
