= Antonov A-1 =

1930s training glider family by Antonov

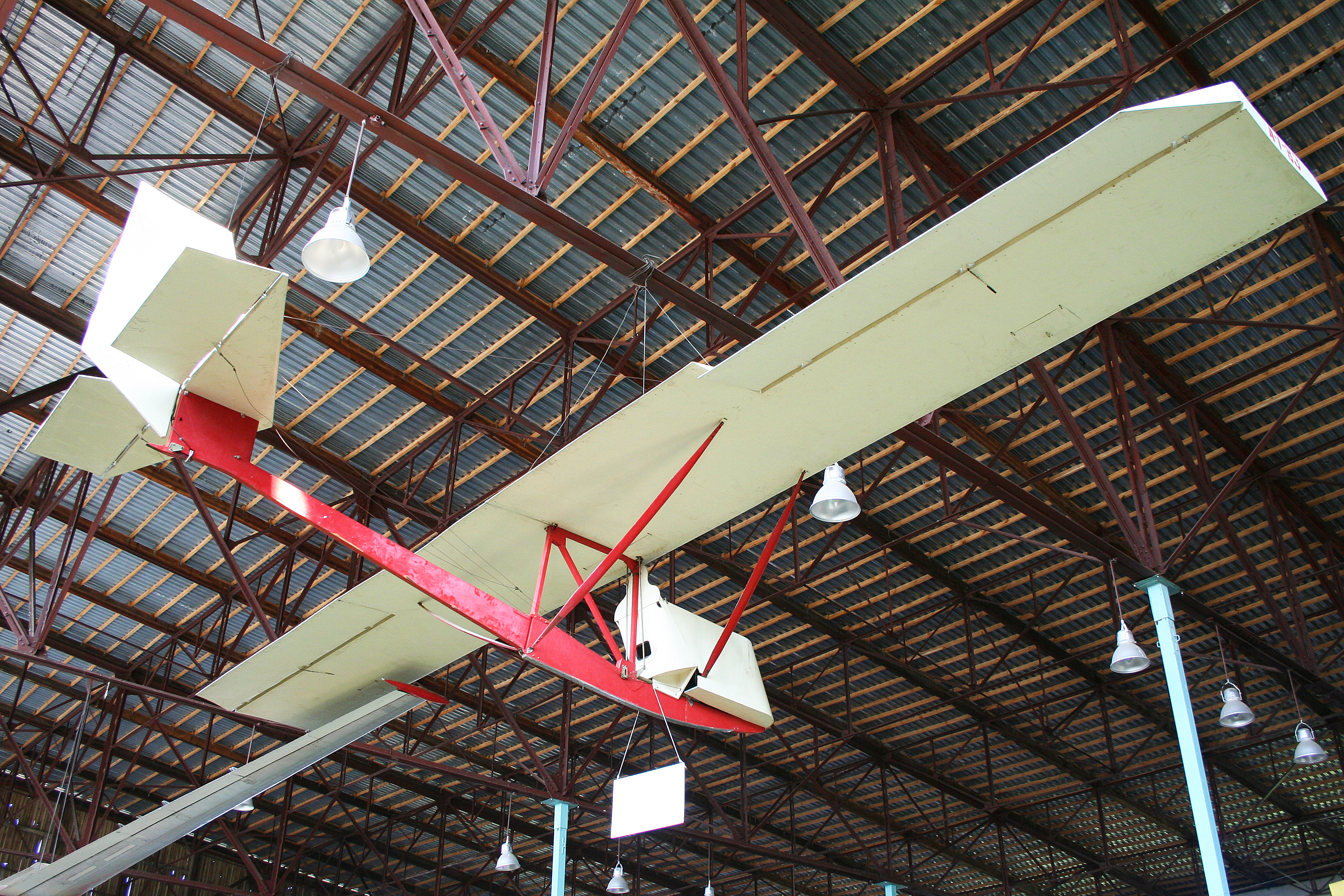

General information
- Type: Training glider
- National origin: USSR
- Designer: Oleg Konstantinovich Antonov
- Number built: ca. 5,700

History
- First flight: 1930

The Antonov A-1 is a single-seat training glider produced in the Soviet Union in the 1930s and 1940s. The glider also produced in Turkey by THK and MKE, and in Finland by PIK and some other manufacturers.

== Development ==
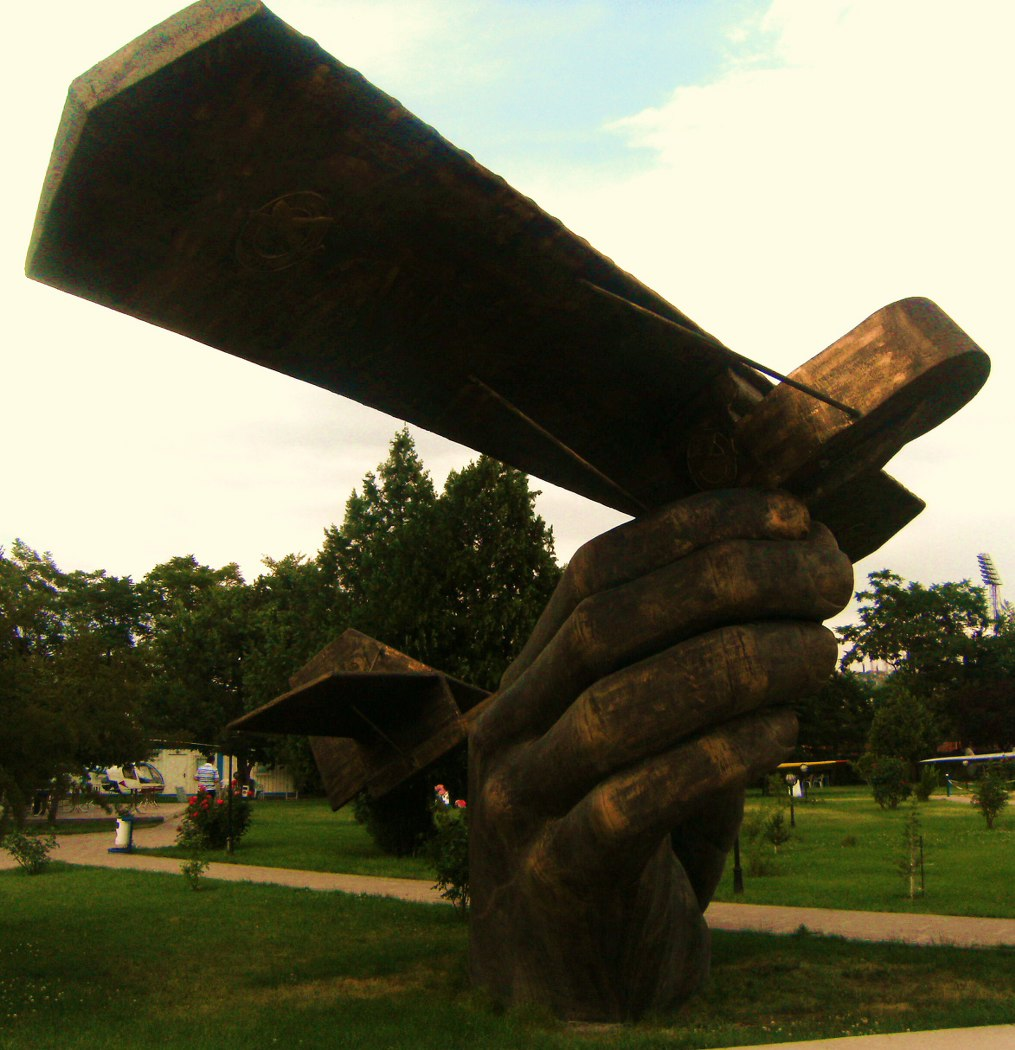
Full scale THK-4 glider monument at the Museum of Turkish Aeronautical Association

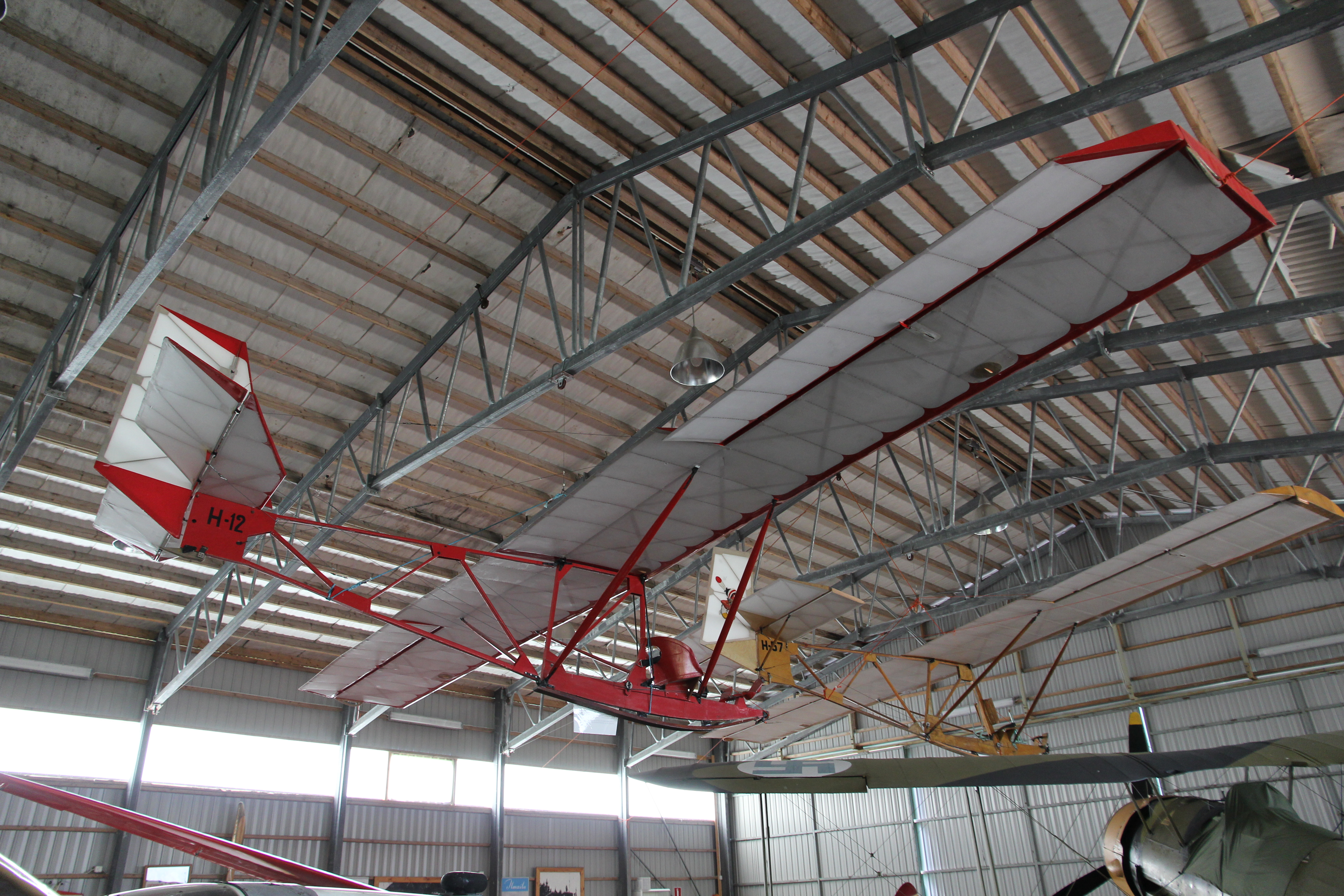
Harakka I and Harakka II gliders at the Karhulan ilmailukerho Aviation Museum

A-1 design derived from the Standard-2 (Стандарт-2), designed and flown by Oleg Konstantinovich Antonov in 1930, which in turn was derived from the Standard-1. They were produced in large numbers, with around 5,400 built of the U-s3, U-s4 and P-s2 major versions alone. The same design formed the basis for the Antonov A-2 and its related group of two-seat designs. Altogether, including the two-seaters, production exceeded 7,600 by 1937.

While members of the family varied in detail, they shared the same basic design, and parts were interchangeable between them. The design featured a typical primary glider layout with a conventional empennage carried at the end of a long boom in place of a conventional fuselage. The boom could be folded sideways for storage. The monoplane wing was carried high on a pylon above this "keel" and was further braced to it with two struts on either side. The pilot sat in front of the wing, and was enclosed in a simple U-shaped wooden fairing that was removed by sliding it forward to allow him or her to enter and leave the aircraft. The undercarriage consisted of a single skid underneath the "keel", but this could also be fitted with small wooden wheels.

While the original primary training versions (designated У, 'U') featured wings of constant chord, subsequent variants designed for soaring flight (designated П, 'P') had longer-span wings with tapering outer panels and a streamlined nose fairing. The ultimate development in the line were gliders intended for towed flight (designated Б, 'B), which shared the longer wings and streamlined fairing of the P-types, but added a canopy to enclose the cockpit.

Unlicensed (Licensed, according to some other sources) copies of A-1 and A-2 were produced in Turkey following World War II by Kayseri Tayyare Fabrikasi using reverse engineering of Ps-4:

In order to become self-sufficient and because of increasing, import requirements for gliders in Turkey, their domestic production was established. Therefore, one copy of each aircraft model procured from the USSR were divided, each part was measured, and technical drawings were made. Subsequently the aircraft were copied. This practice of construction (reverse engineering) was also used later by Nuri Demirag, by the Turkish Aeronautical Association (THK) and by the Mechanical and Chemical Industries Corporation (MKEK).

— Tuncay Deniz, Kayseri Tayyare Fabrikasi (KTF), http://www.tuncay-deniz.com/ENGLISH/KTF/ktf.html

Kayseri Tayyare Fabrikasi produced at least 11 copies of Ps-4. THK and Makina ve Kimya Endüstrisi Kurumu (MKE, MKEK) produced dozens of the THK-4 (A-1, U-s4), THK-7 (A-2, P-s2) and MKEK-6 (A-2, P-s2), which was used for Turkish military pilots training.

During the Winter War, Finns captured few gliders and drawings of Ps-4 in Äänislinna, which then used by Polyteknikkojen Ilmailukerho to produce its clones and modifications under the names of Harakka I and Harakka II (aka PIK-7, an improved variant of Harakka I) for Finnish pilots training and research purposes.

== Variants ==
In each case, the "s" stands for serii (серии: 'series')

=== Prototypes ===
Standard-1 (Стандарт-1)
Standard-2 (Стандарт-2)

=== Trainers ===
Uchebnyi (Учебный, 'Trainer')

U-s1 (У-с1)
U-s2 (У-с2) (First version built in series)
U-s3 (У-с3) (1,600 built)
U-s4 (У-с4) (Redesignated A-1, major production version. 3000 built)

=== Sailplanes ===
Paritel (Паритель, 'Sailplane'), also Upar (Упар, portmanteau of учебный паритель, uchebnyi paritel, 'training sailplane') (800 built)

P-s1 (П-с1)
P-s2 (П-с2)

=== Towed ===
Buksirovochnye (Буксировочные, 'Towed') (265 built by 1937)

B-s3 (Б-с3)
B-s4 (Б-с4)
B-s5 (Б-с5)

== Specifications (A-1) ==

Data from Krasil'shchikov 1991, 230

General characteristics

- Crew: one pilot
- Length: 5.60 m (18 ft 5 in)
- Wingspan: 10.56 m (34 ft 8 in)
- Height: 1.70 m (5 ft 7 in)
- Wing area: 15.6 m^{2} (168 sq ft)
- Empty weight: 92 kg (200 lb)
- Gross weight: 164 kg (361 lb)

Performance

- Maximum speed: 70 km/h (40 mph, 35 kn)
- Rate of sink: 1.2 m/s (240 ft/min)

== See also ==
- Antonov A-2
