= Valmet PIK-23 Towmaster =

1980s Finnish light aircraft

PIK-23 Towmaster
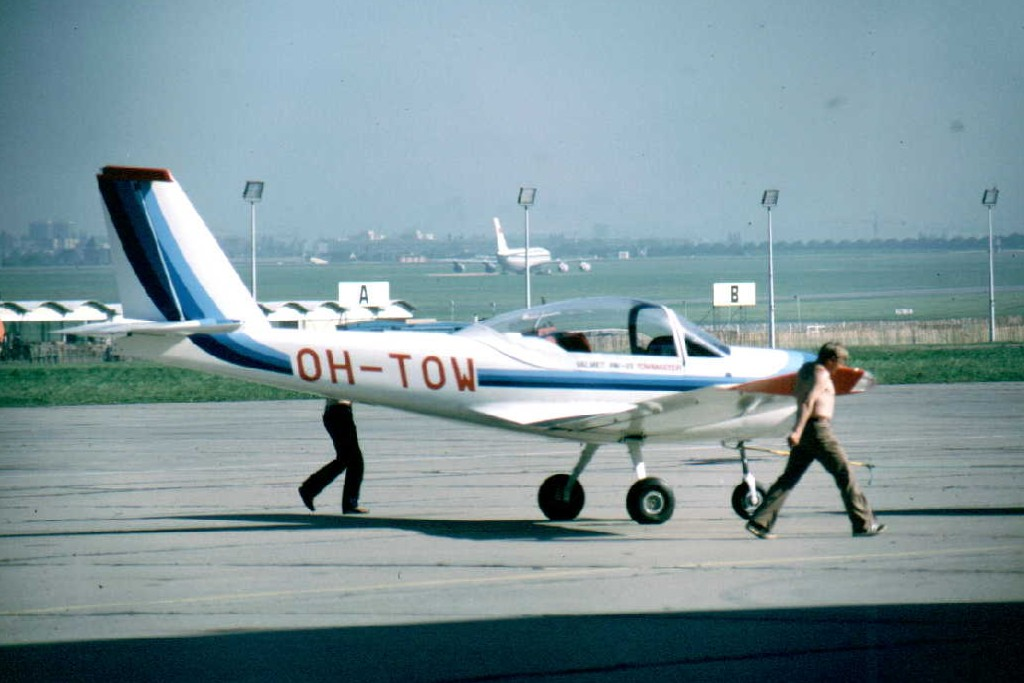

General information
- Type: Glider-tower/primary trainer
- Manufacturer: Valmet
- Number built: 2

History
- Manufactured: 1982-83
- Introduction date: 1982
- First flight: March 22, 1982
- Developed from: PIK-19 Muhinu

The Valmet PIK-23 Towmaster or Suhinu is a Finnish two-seater glider-towing/primary trainer aircraft built entirely out of composite materials in the early 1980s.

== Design and development ==
The Finnish technology students aviation club (PIK) suggested in the 1970s, that a new aircraft should be developed for glider towing. The work focused on the improvement of a previous design, the PIK-19 Muhinu. Later on, the Helsinki University of Technology and Valmet Oy joined the project and the design process started from scratch. The goal was to develop a target/glider tower, which also could be used for basic training. It was given the name "PIK-23 Towmaster".

Only two aircraft were manufactured, one at Valmet and one at the Helsinki University of Technology. The first aircraft, OH-TOW, made its maiden flight on March 22, 1982, flown by Mikko Järvi. The second aircraft, OH-TUG, flew the following year.

Valmet marketed the aircraft intensively, but no orders followed. It was also investigated if the aircraft could be sold in parts, for self-assembly, in order to lower the price. In its intended role as a glider tower, the PIK-23 has been quite successful.

== Specifications (PIK-23) ==
Data from Jane's All The World's Aircraft 1982-83

General characteristics

- Crew: 2
- Length: 7.19 m (23 ft 7 in)
- Wingspan: 10.00 m (32 ft 10 in)
- Height: 2.90 m (9 ft 6 in)
- Wing area: 14.00 m^{2} (150.7 sq ft)
- Aspect ratio: 7.14:1
- Airfoil: NACA 63_{2}415 (modified)
- Empty weight: 590 kg (1,301 lb)
- Max takeoff weight: 870 kg (1,918 lb)
- Fuel capacity: 200 L (44 imp gal; 53 US gal)
- Powerplant: 1 × Avco Lycoming O-360-A4M air-cooled flat-four piston engine, 130 kW (180 hp)
- Propellers: 2-bladed Hoffmann fixed pitch

Performance

- Maximum speed: 250 km/h (160 mph, 130 kn) at sea level
- Cruise speed: 220 km/h (140 mph, 120 kn) at 3,660 m (12,010 ft) (65% power)
- Stall speed: 78 km/h (48 mph, 42 kn) (flaps down)
- Never exceed speed: 281 km/h (175 mph, 152 kn)
- Range: 1,250 km (780 mi, 670 nmi) at 3,660 m (12,010 ft) (65% power)
- Endurance: 6 hr 30 min (55% power)
- Rate of climb: 5.80 m/s (1,142 ft/min)
- Takeoff run to 15 m (50 ft): 320 m (1,050 ft)

== See also ==
Related lists

- List of civil aircraft
