= Gloster Gauntlet =

Fighter aircraft in the UK

Gauntlet
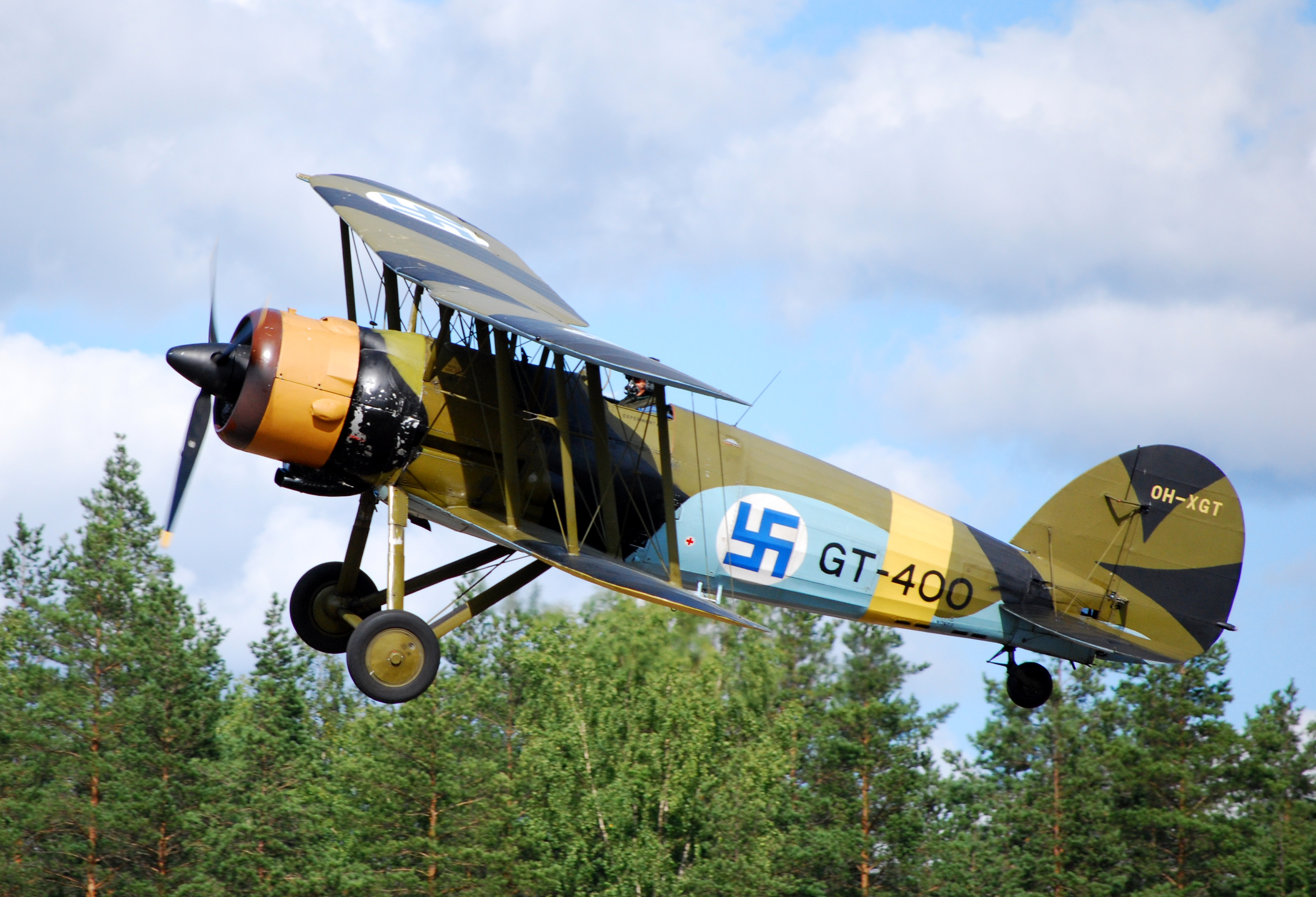
- An ex-Finnish Air Force Gloster Gauntlet Mk II, GT-400, taking off at Selänpää Airfield, 2008

General information
- Type: Fighter
- National origin: United Kingdom
- Manufacturer: Gloster Aircraft
- Primary users: Royal Air Force Finland; Denmark
- Number built: 246

History
- Manufactured: 1933–1936
- Introduction date: 1935
- First flight: 1933
- Retired: 1943 (U.K.); 1945 (Finland)
- Developed from: Gloster S.S.18/19
- Variant: Gloster Gladiator

The Gloster Gauntlet was a single-seat biplane fighter designed and produced by the British aeroplane manufacturer Gloster Aircraft in the 1930s. It was the last fighter to be operated by the Royal Air Force (RAF) to have an open cockpit, and also the penultimate biplane fighter in its service.

The Gauntlet had a somewhat lengthy development process, linking back to the S.S.18 prototype of 1929. Extensive modifications, including multiple engine changes and changes to suit varying specifications, resulted in a relatively fast fighter aircraft for the era as well as a heavy armament and favourable manoeuvrability. By mid-1933, the Gauntlet name had been applied to the type and the Air Ministry placed an initial order for 24 aircraft during September of that year. It was procured as a replacement for the Bristol Bulldog, being roughly 50 mph (80 km/h) faster and more heavily armed. In May 1935, 19 Squadron became the first unit to receive the Gauntlet I.

An improved model, the Gauntlet II, featuring structural improvements from Gloster's new parent company, Hawker was developed during 1934; deliveries of this new model commenced in the following year. Gloster received orders for over 200 Gauntlet IIs, with the type eventually being operated by 14 RAF squadrons in RAF Fighter Command. It was used for various duties, including a secretive series of exercises that included the first interception of an aircraft using information relayed from ground-based radar, a technique that would prove to be vital during the Second World War. By 1936, frontline squadrons began to be equipped with more advanced fighters, such as the Gloster Gladiator, Hawker Hurricane and Supermarine Spitfire. Gauntlets were increasingly used in secondary roles and by overseas squadrons, serving in a reduced capacity into the Second World War. The last examples were withdrawn during 1943.

== Design and development ==
=== Background ===
The Gloster Gauntlet can be traced back to the S.S.18 prototype, which made its maiden flight during January 1929. While its performance had proven the basic design to be sound, having demonstrated a maximum speed of 189 mph (304 km/h), difficulties with the Bristol Mercury IIA engine that powered the aircraft motivated Gloster to explore other powerplants, which ultimately resulted in the structurally similar Gloster S.S.19. Around this time, the Air Ministry was formulating Specification F.10/27, which called for a single-seat fighter aircraft that was to be armed with six machine guns and function as a high altitude interceptor; Henry Folland, Gloster's chief designer, opted to modify the S.S.19 to carry a heavier armament (four machine guns in the wings and two in the fuselage). Extensive trials of the aircraft were conducted at RAF Martlesham Heath during late 1930, in which it was found to be free of major detects and to have superior handling to any single-seat aircraft up to that point.

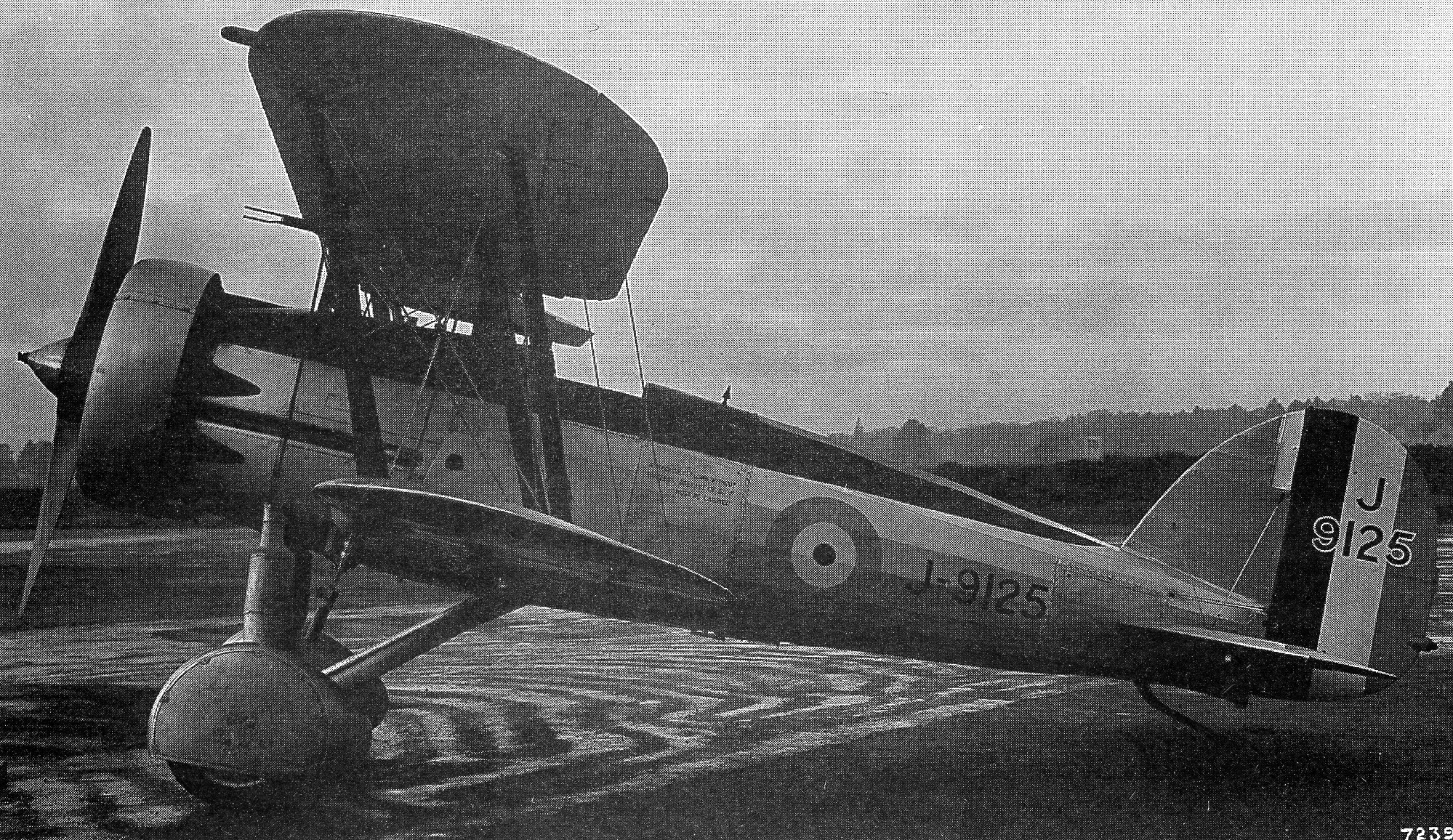
J9125 as the Gauntlet predecessor S.19A in December 1932: Jupiter VIIF engine

Despite the S.S.19's promising performance, attitudes within the Air Staff on the armament of the prospective fighter had shifted and changes were requested. Folland decided to respond by refining the aircraft's design, such as the addition of main wheel spats, a spatted tail wheel, and a modified tail unit with greater fin area increasing stability. Re-named the S.S.19A, the aircraft underwent a full service evaluation during late 1931, during which it achieved a top speed of 204 mph (328 km/h). Further modifications were made to satisfy Specification F.20/27, resulting in the Gloster S.S.19B. Evaluation flights of this revision revealed the aircraft to possess a maximum speed of 212 mph (341 km/h).

By the summer of 1933, testing had progressed with the S.S.19B and plans to procure the type had advanced to the point where the Gauntlet name was assigned to the type. Having been re-engined with a Bristol Mercury VIs engine, the type proved itself capable of a top speed of 215.5 mph (346.8 km/h) as well as attaining an altitude of 20,000 feet in 11 minutes and 43 seconds. Having been satisfied by the aircraft's performance, the Air Ministry placed an initial order via a draft production schedule for 24 Gauntlets to replace one squadron of Bristol Bulldog fighters during September 1933; the final specification and contract No. 285263/35 were issued to Gloster in February 1934.

=== Into production ===
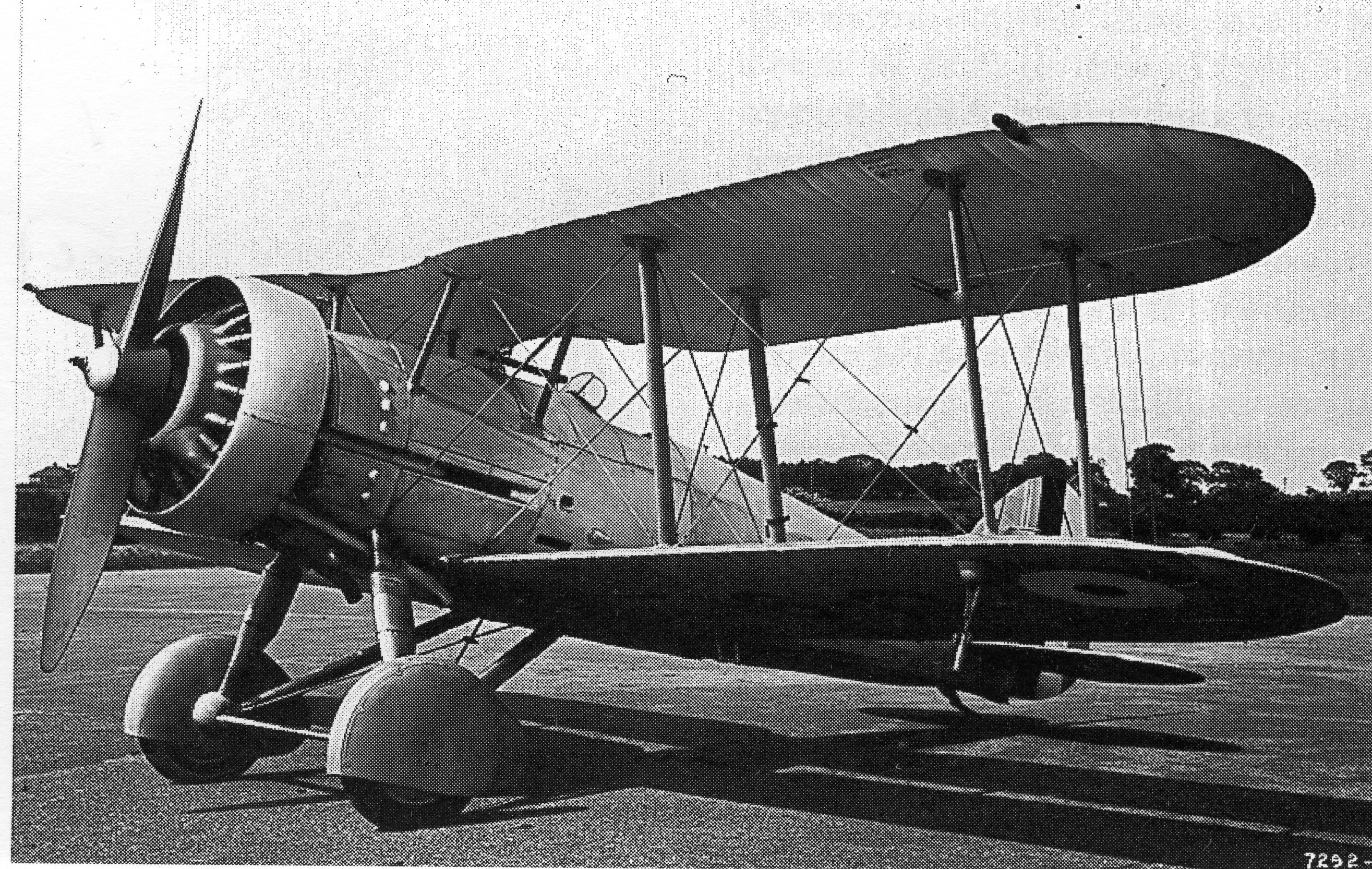
J9125 as the Gauntlet predecessor S.19B in May 1933: Mercury VIs engine

During December 1934, the first production Gauntlet, K4081, was completed; on 17 December of that year, it performed its maiden flight from Gloster's Hucclecote factory. On 25 May 1935, the first two aircraft were delivered to 19 Squadron, while 20 of the first 24 Gauntlets had been completed by the end of the following month, the majority of which were also promptly dispatched to join 19 Squadron. While the type's development had been lengthy, it resulted in an aircraft that was relatively trouble-free and quickly acquired a favourable reputation.

As a result of Hawker's takeover of Gloster in 1934, there as a considerable emphasis placed upon the latter to standardise its construction and design techniques with that of its new parent company. While the Gauntlet programme had been sufficiently advanced as to make major alterations to the first production batch unfeasible, it was determined to be quite beneficial for future production batches to incorporate Hawker structural elements, largely in the rear fuselage of the aircraft, as this would reduce assembly costs and be easier to repair by reducing the use of welding. The revised aircraft, usually known as the Gauntlet II, led to the initial batch being called the Gauntlet I.

During April 1935, Gloster received contract No. 396880/35, which ordered 104 Gauntlet IIs. In September 1935, a follow-on order via contract No. 442477/35 for another 100 aircraft was issued to the company. Deliveries of the Gauntlet II commenced during May 1935, with the first examples being issued to 56 Squadron and 111 Squadron. A total of 204 Gauntlet IIs were produced in the UK.

== Operational history ==
The first squadron to receive the Gauntlet I was 19 Squadron at RAF Duxford, who received their first examples during May 1935. Its performance was a clear advance over the Bristol Bulldog, being 56 mph (90 km/h) faster than its predecessor, and between 1935 and 1937 it was the fastest aircraft in operation with the RAF. Enough were bought to become the most common fighter of the service during this time.

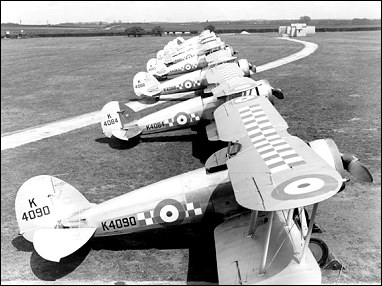
A line of Gloster Gauntlets, circa 1936

During May 1936, the improved Gauntlet II entered service with 56 Squadron and 111 Squadron, while a further six squadrons being re-equipped with the Gauntlet by the end of the year. Beyond its typical role, the type was occasionally used for other duties, such as for meteorological and competition flights. A secretive use of the Gauntlet was conducted by 32 (The Royal) Squadron, which participated in early trials of ground-based radar, helping to develop techniques for the direction of fighters; these exercises included the first successful radar-controlled interception, a technique that would prove invaluable during the Second World War.

In May 1937, 14 RAF Fighter Command squadrons operated the type. By 1936 the RAF began to procure more advanced fighters, such as the Gloster Gladiator, Hawker Hurricane and Supermarine Spitfire, and these began to replace the Gauntlet. Gauntlets were typically transferred to new units, serving as their first equipment to allow them to train in advance of receiving more modern fighters. It was also decided to ship many Gauntlets to distant parts of the British Empire, such as to equip three RAF squadrons that were stationed in the Middle East. In September 1938, when the Munich Crisis threatened war with Germany, 45 per cent of the RAF's fighter squadrons (nine squadrons) still flew the Gauntlet, with only three squadrons equipped with Hurricanes.

By the outbreak of the Second World War, all but 616 Squadron of the home-based Gauntlet squadrons had re-equipped with more modern fighters. The type remained in front line service in the Middle East for some time; a flight of Gauntlets remained in service with 3 Squadron Royal Australian Air Force (RAAF) in the Middle East when Italy declared war in 1940. These aircraft were briefly used for ground-attack operations against the Italians before being retired from operations owing to maintenance problems. In August 1940, 430 Flight was formed in Sudan with a mixture of Gauntlets and Vickers Vincents for army co-operation during the East African campaign, with the Gauntlets carrying out bombing and strafing operations against Italian forces. Sudan was where Flight Lieutenant Arthur Brewerton Mitchell scored the only recorded air-to-air victory in a Gauntlet, when he shot down an Italian Caproni Ca.133 transport plane. Gauntlets remained in meteorological flights until 1943.

Seventeen Gauntlets IIs were licence-produced in Denmark and 25 ex-RAF machines were supplied by South Africa as part of its support for Finland in 1940, which was engaged in the Winter War against the Soviet Union. Obsolete at this point, they were used as advanced trainers by the Finns. The Finnish nickname for the Gauntlet was Kotletti (literally "cutlet").

== Variants ==
- SS.18 : Single-seat prototype (J9125). The aircraft was fitted with a 450-hp (336-kW) Bristol Mercury IIA radial piston engine, which proved unreliable.
- SS.18A : The SS.18 was fitted with a 480 hp (358 kW) Bristol Jupiter VIIF radial piston engine.
- SS.18B : The SS.18, testfitted with a 560 hp (418 kW) Armstrong Siddeley Panther III radial piston engine.
- SS.19 : Single-seat prototype, still on airframe J9125; fitted with a Bristol Jupiter VII radial piston engine and a Townend ring.
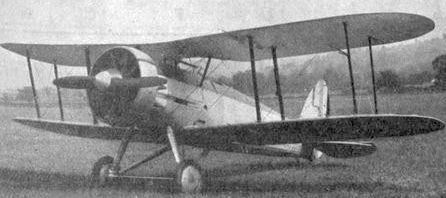
  Gloster SS.19 photo from L'Aerophile May 1932
- SS.19A : The SS.19 was later fitted with a Jupiter VIIFS and was given the SS.19A designation for the official trials, which began in September 1930. Numerous running changes were made to fin and rudders and elsewhere; eventually a tailwheel replaced the rear skid.
- SS.19B : The SS.19A was fitted with a 536 hp (400 kW) Bristol Mercury VIS radial piston engine in February 1933; this was upgraded to produce 570 hp (425 kW) by mid-1933. By April 1935 it had been modified again, now with the production-spec VIS2 engine, and underwent acceptance trials.
- Gauntlet Mk I : Single-seat fighter aircraft for the RAF; 24 built.
- Gauntlet Mk II : Single-seat fighter aircraft; modified version of the Gauntlet Mk I incorporating Hawker production methods; 221 built.

== Operators ==
Australia

- Royal Australian Air Force
  - No. 3 Squadron

Denmark

- Hærens Flyvetropper
  - No. 1 Squadron Hærens Flyvetropper

Finland

- Finnish Air Force
  - No. 30 Squadron
  - No. 34 Squadron
  - No. 25 Squadron
  - No. 17 Squadron
  - No. 35 Squadron

Southern Rhodesia

- Southern Rhodesian Air Force
  - No. 1 Squadron

South Africa

- South African Air Force
  - No. 1 Squadron
  - No. 2 Squadron

United Kingdom

- Royal Air Force
  - No. 6 Squadron
  - No. 17 Squadron
  - No. 19 Squadron
  - No. 32 Squadron
  - No. 33 Squadron
  - No. 46 Squadron
  - No. 47 Squadron
  - No. 54 Squadron
  - No. 56 Squadron
  - No. 65 Squadron
  - No. 66 Squadron
  - No. 73 Squadron
  - No. 74 Squadron
  - No. 79 Squadron
  - No. 80 Squadron
  - No. 111 Squadron
  - No. 112 Squadron
  - No. 151 Squadron
  - No. 213 Squadron
  - No. 234 Squadron
  - No. 237 Squadron
  - No. 504 Squadron
  - No. 601 Squadron
  - No. 602 Squadron
  - No. 615 Squadron
  - No. 616 Squadron

== Surviving aircraft ==
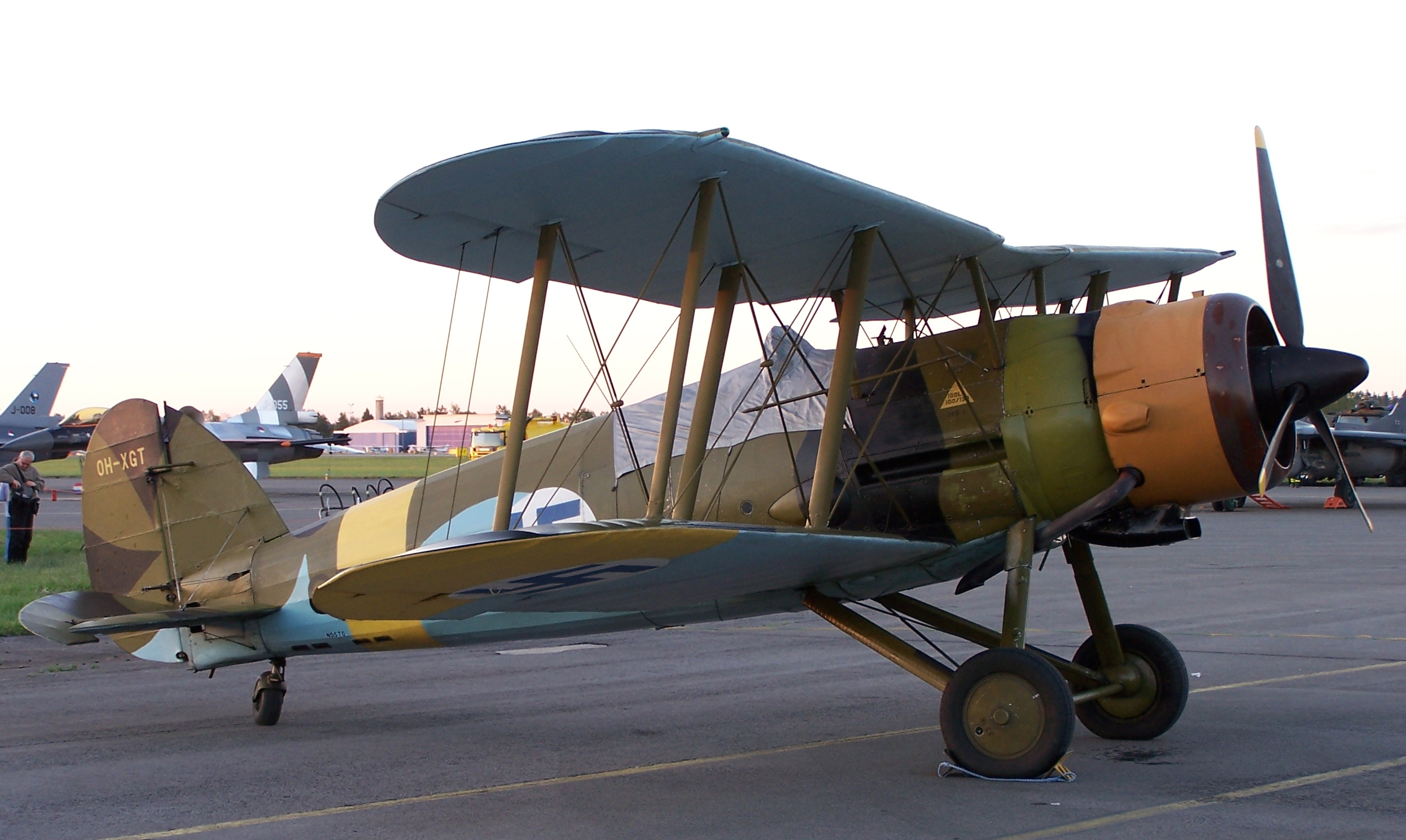
Gloster Gauntlet in Kauhava, Finland at Midnight Sun Airshow 2006

As of 2008, the only remaining airworthy Gauntlet II in the world, GT-400, is registered in Finland where it spends its summers in the Karhula Flying Club Aviation Museum at the Kymi Airfield near Kotka. This aircraft is fitted with a 520 hp (388 kW) Alvis Leonides radial engine.

== Specifications (Gauntlet Mk II) ==
Gloster Gauntlet 3-view drawing

Data from Gloster Aircraft since 1917

General characteristics

- Crew: 1
- Length: 26 ft 5 in (8.05 m)
- Wingspan: 32 ft 9.5 in (9.995 m)
- Height: 10 ft 3 in (3.12 m)
- Wing area: 315 sq ft (29.3 m^{2})
- Empty weight: 2,770 lb (1,256 kg)
- Gross weight: 3,970 lb (1,801 kg)
- Powerplant: 1 × Bristol Mercury VI S2 (Note: According to Lumsden and Thetford, the engine fitted to the Gauntlet I and II was the Mercury VI S, as stated in Air Ministry publications and contemporary A&AEE reports. The two engine types had different gearing ratios.) nine-cylinder air-cooled radial piston engine, 645 hp (481 kW)
- Propellers: 2-bladed fixed-pitch propeller

Performance

- Maximum speed: 230 mph (370 km/h, 200 kn) at 15,800 ft (4,800 m)
- Range: 460 mi (740 km, 400 nmi)
- Service ceiling: 33,500 ft (10,200 m)
- Rate of climb: 2,300 ft/min (12 m/s)
- Time to altitude: 20,000 ft (6,100 m) in 9 minutes
- Wing loading: 12.6 lb/sq ft (62 kg/m^{2})
- Power/mass: 0.162 hp/lb (0.266 kW/kg)

Armament

- Guns: Two × 0.303 in Vickers machine guns

== See also ==
Related development

- Gloster Gladiator

Aircraft of comparable role, configuration, and era

- Avia B-534
- Blériot-SPAD S.510
- Bristol Bulldog
- Caproni Ca.114
- Fiat CR.30
- Hawker Fury
- Kawasaki Ki-10
- Polikarpov I-15

Related lists

- List of aircraft of the Royal Air Force
