= Lehtovaara PIK-16 Vasama =

Finnish glider

PIK-16 Vasama
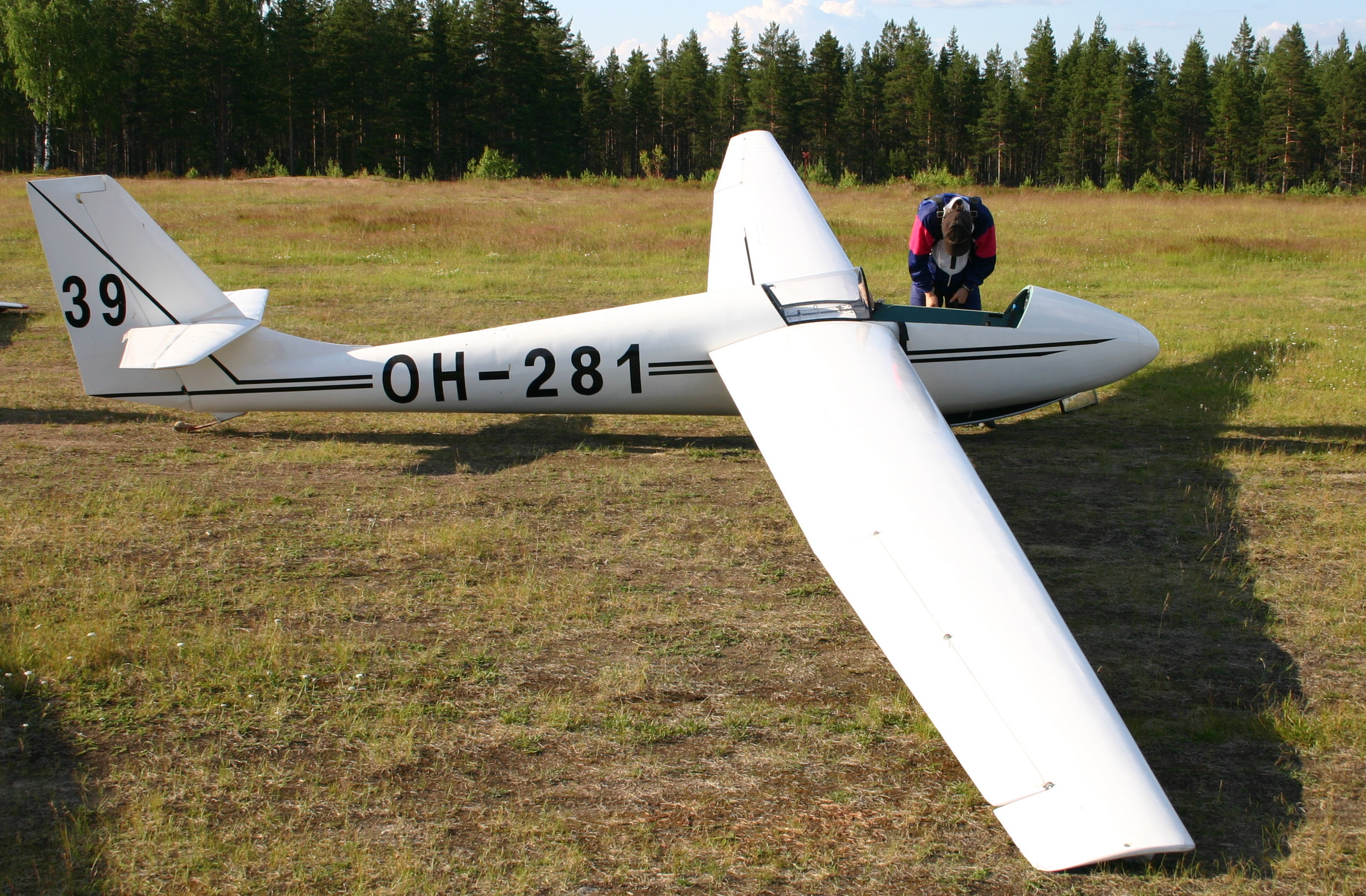

General information
- Type: Glider
- National origin: Finland
- Designer: Tuomo Tervo, Jorma Jalkanen and Kurt Hedstrom, students at the Polyteknikkojen Ilmailukerho (PIK)
- Number built: 56

History
- Introduction date: 1961

The Lehtovaara PIK-16 Vasama (English: Arrow) is a Finnish mid-wing, single-seat, FAI Standard Class glider that was designed by Tuomo Tervo, Jorma Jalkanen and Kurt Hedstrom, who were students at the Polyteknikkojen Ilmailukerho (PIK) and produced by Lehtovaara.

== Design and development ==
The PIK-16 is constructed from wood, with a fibreglass nose. The 15.0 m (49.2 ft) span wing employs a Wortmann FX-05-168 (14% modification) airfoil at the wing root, transitioning to a NACA 63 (2)-165 at the wing tip. The wing features dive brakes. The prototype Vasama had V tail, but it was changed to cruciform tail on production aircraft.

A total of 56 PIK-16s were built. The aircraft was not type certified but it did become the second most exported Finnish glider, surpassed only by the later PIK-20 series.

== Operational history ==
The prototype PIK-16 set a Finnish national record for a 300 km (186 mi) triangle course of 86.6 km/h (54 mph) before it had even finished flight testing.

The design won the OSTIV prize at the World Gliding Championships held at Junín, Buenos Aires Province, Argentina in 1963, finishing third in the standard class.

== Variants ==
PIK-16a
Prototype with a V-tail.
PIK-16b
Revised design with a cruciform tail, four built by the Finnish Aeronautical Association at the Jämi Flying School.
PIK-16c
Third version

== Aircraft on display ==
- Finnish Aviation Museum

== Specifications (Pik-16 Vasama) ==
Data from The World's Sailplanes:Die Segelflugzeuge der Welt:Les Planeurs du Monde Volume II

General characteristics

- Crew: 1
- Length: 5.97 m (19 ft 7 in)
- Wingspan: 15 m (49 ft 3 in)
- Height: 0.9 m (2 ft 11 in) at cockpit
- Wing area: 11.7 m^{2} (126 sq ft)
- Aspect ratio: 19.2
- Airfoil: Root: Wortmann FX-05-188 (14% mod), tip:NACA 63_{2} 615
- Empty weight: 166 kg (366 lb)
- Gross weight: 281 kg (619 lb)

Performance

- Stall speed: 62 km/h (39 mph, 33 kn)
- Never exceed speed: 250 km/h (160 mph, 130 kn)
- Rough air speed max: 180 km/h (111.8 mph; 97.2 kn)
- Aerotow speed: 150 km/h (93.2 mph; 81.0 kn)
- Winch launch speed: 140 km/h (87.0 mph; 75.6 kn)
- Terminal velocity: with full airbrakes 235 km/h (146 mph; 127 kn)
- g limits: +7 -4 at 160 km/h (99.4 mph; 86.4 kn)
- Maximum glide ratio: 34.5 at 86 km/h (53.4 mph; 46.4 kn)
- Rate of sink: 0.59 m/s (116 ft/min) at 73 km/h (45.4 mph; 39.4 kn)
- Wing loading: 24 kg/m^{2} (4.9 lb/sq ft)

== See also ==
Related lists

- List of gliders
