= Tervamäki JT-5 =

1970s homebuilt autogyro from Finland

JT-5

General information
- Type: recreational autogyro
- National origin: Finland
- Manufacturer: homebuilt
- Designer: Jukka Tervamäki
- Number built: at least 5

History
- First flight: 7 January 1973
- Developed from: Tervamäki ATE-3
- Developed into: VPM MT-7

The Tervamäki JT-5, later marketed as the VPM MT-5, is a single-seat autogyro developed in Finland by Jukka Tervamäki in the early 1970s and which was marketed in kit form for amateur construction. A development of his ATE-3 design of 1968, the JT-5 first flew in 1973, and Tervamäki sold the prototype, its tooling, and its manufacturing rights the following year.

== Design ==
The JT-5 features a streamlined fuselage pod that fully encloses its cockpit and a single, piston engine that drives a pusher propeller. It has a two-bladed main rotor, and fixed, tricycle undercarriage. The structure makes extensive use of composite materials around a frame of welded steel tube. The empennage is a triple tail that consists of a large fin and rudder plus smaller fins at the ends of the horizontal stabiliser, an arrangement that Tervamäki compared to that of the Lockheed Constellation. This configuration was chosen to increase the area of the tail surfaces and therefore the static and dynamic stability of the aircraft. Tervamäki saw this as an important safety feature to reduce the possibility of pilot-induced oscillation, which had been implicated in fatal autogyro crashes.

The cockpit is enclosed by an expansive plexiglass canopy that hinges sideways. The instrument panel and the firewall that separates the cockpit from the rotor mast and engine hinge together with the canopy. This feature was intended to facilitate inspection and maintenance of the instruments, nosegear, rudder pedals, and front side of the engine. The level of access to the engine that this created was so great that most routine engine inspection tasks could be carried out without removing the cowling.

Provisions for cold weather include an optional cabin heater, a ventilation system to prevent canopy fogging, and a carburettor heater.

The prototype was powered by a Volkswagen automotive engine modified for aero use by Limbach Motorenbau. VPM specified a Limbach L1700 for the MT-5 instead. The aircraft is equipped with a pre-rotation mechanism for the rotor.

== Development ==
Design work on the JT-5 began in 1969, and construction of the prototype the following year. Initially, the work was shared between Tervamäki and Aulis Eerola, with whom he had collaborated on the ATE-3. Eerola contributed to some of the construction work, but departed the project before its completion. Some of the funding for the development work came from a grant by the Finnish Technical Foundation. Tervamäki estimated that around 2,000 hours' work went into the prototype over three years. He later reflected that this level of effort was contrary to one of the main reasons he had originally been drawn to autogyros: their simplicity.

The prototype first flew on 7 January 1973, carrying the registration OH-XYS.

By then, however, Tervamäki's focus was on his JT-6 motorglider, and he realised that he would not have time to effectively market and support the JT-5. Therefore, in 1974, he sold the prototype, together with its moulds, tooling, and manufacturing rights to Vittorio Magni. In 1979, Magni founded the VPM company to market components and complete kits of the aircraft under the name VPM MT-5. The following year, Magni contracted Tervamäki to design an enlarged, two-seat derivative, the MT-7.

In 1986, VPM sold the rights to the MT-5 and MT-7 to Spanish firm Cenemesa.

Apart from the prototype, at least four other JT-5s were built by 2009, three in Finland and one in Sweden, with a number of others under construction. Tervamäki continued to sell JT-5 plans for some time, with around 60 sets sold by 1979. He later made them available for free download on his personal website.

== Specifications (prototype JT-5) ==
Data from Taylor 1986, p.564

General characteristics

- Crew: one pilot
- Length: 3.50 m (11 ft 6 in) (fuselage)
- Empty weight: 167 kg (368 lb)
- Max takeoff weight: 290 kg (639 lb)
- Powerplant: 1 × Volkswagen four-cylinder, horizontally-opposed, air-cooled automotive engine, 56 kW (75 hp)
- Main rotor diameter: 7.00 m (23 ft 0 in)
- Main rotor area: 38.50 m^{2} (414.4 sq ft)

Performance

- Maximum speed: 170 km/h (110 mph, 92 kn)
- Cruise speed: 150 km/h (93 mph, 81 kn)
- Range: 350 km (220 mi, 190 nmi)
- Service ceiling: 4,000 m (13,000 ft)
- Rate of climb: 3 m/s (590 ft/min)

== Notes ==
=== Bibliography ===
- Charnov, Bruce H. (27–29 May 2009). From Rolf von Bahr to Jukka Tervamäki: The Scandinavian Influence on European Gyroplane History. American Helicopter Society 65th Annual Forum. Archived from the original on 5 May 2009.
- Raivio, Jyri (May 1973). "Tuo lentävä mies mainiossa koneessaan" [That flying man in his magnificent plane]. Ilmailu. Vol. 36, no. 5. Helsinki: Suomen ilmailuliitto. pp. 10–12.
- Shelbourne, Walter (October 1979). "The Jukka Tervamaki JT-5". Homebuilt Aircraft. Vol. 5, no. 8. pp. 28–29.
- "La Storia" [History]. Magni Gyro: produzione autogiri per il lavoro e per il tempo libero. Besante: Magni Gyro srl.
- Markowski, Mark (1984). The Encyclopedia of Homebuilt Aircraft. Blue Ridge Summit, Pennsylvania: Tab Books.
- Taylor, John W.R., ed. (1986). Jane's All the World's Aircraft 1986-87 (77th ed.). London: Jane's Pub.
- Taylor, John W.R., ed. (1987). Jane's All the World's Aircraft 1987-88 (78th ed.). London: Jane's Information Group.
- Taylor, Michael J. H. (1993). Jane's Encyclopedia of Aviation. London: Studio Editions.
- Tervamäki, Jukka (n.d.). "The JT-5 Autogyro". The Home Page of Jukka Tervamaki.
- Tervamäki, Jukka (August 1973). "New Super Sleek Autogyro From Finland". Popular Rotorcraft Flying. Vol. 11, no. 3. Raleigh, North Carolina: Popular Rotorcraft Association. p. 24.
- Tervamäki, Jukka (February 1974). "The Sleek New JT-5 From Finland". Sport Aviation. Vol. 23, no. 2. pp. 39–41, 61.
