= BS5 =

BS5 may refer to:

- BS5, a BS postcode area for Bristol, England
- BS5, a center drill bit size
- B-s5, a variant of the Antonov A-1 aircraft
- BS-V Bharat Stage emission standards in India
- BS 5 Report on Locomotives for Indian Railways, a British Standard
