= Fibera KK-1e Utu =

KK-1e Utu
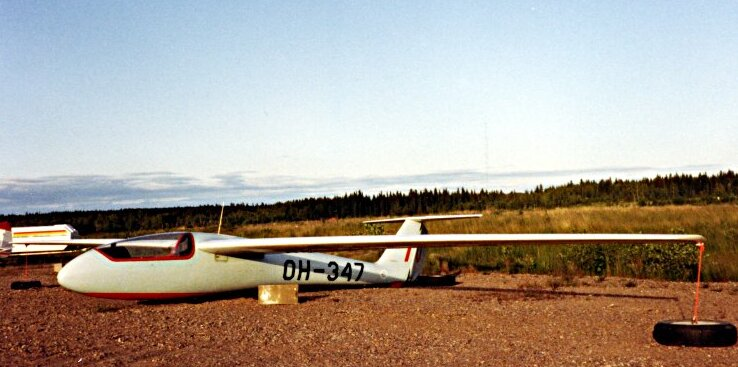

General information
- Type: Glider
- National origin: Finland
- Manufacturer: Fibera
- Designer: Ahto Anttila
- Status: Production completed
- Number built: 22

History
- Introduction date: 1964
- First flight: August 1964

The Fibera KK-1e Utu (English: Mist) is a Finnish mid-wing, T-tailed, single-seat, FAI Standard Class glider that was designed by Ahto Anttila and produced by Fibera in the 1960s.

== Design and development ==
The KK-1e was one of the first fibreglass sailplanes produced, first flying in 1964.

The KK-1e has a 15.0 m (49.2 ft) span wing, with a single spar. The wing employs a NACA 63-618 airfoil at the wing root, changing to a NACA 63-612 section at the wing tip. The wing features a split terminal velocity trailing edge combination spoiler/dive brake. The landing gear is a fixed monowheel.

The aircraft was not type certified and the one aircraft imported into the United States was registered with the Federal Aviation Administration in the Experimental - Exhibition/Racing category.

== Operational history ==
Only one KK-1e was imported into the United States in 1967. As of July 2011 this aircraft was still registered with the FAA to its original owner.

== Aircraft on display ==
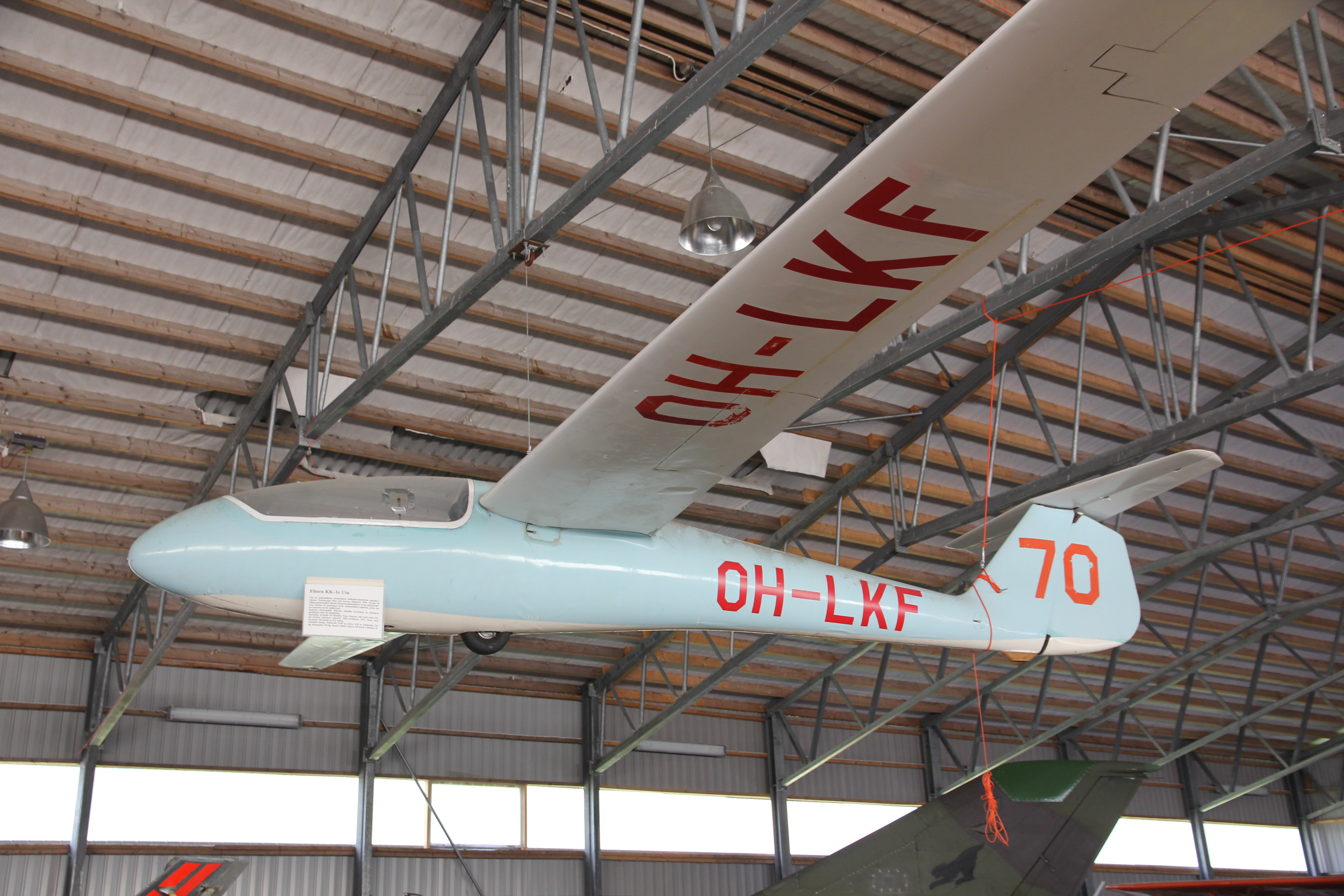
Fibera KK-1e Utu hanging in the Karhulan ilmailukerho Aviation Museum.

- Finnish Aviation Museum - 2
- Karhulan ilmailukerho Aviation Museum - 1

== Specifications (KK-1e) ==
Data from Sailplane Directory, Soaring and Karhulan ilmailukerho Aviation Museum

General characteristics

- Crew: one
- Length: 6.5 m (21 ft 4 in)
- Wingspan: 15.0 m (49 ft 3 in)
- Wing area: 11.2 m^{2} (121 sq ft)
- Aspect ratio: 20:1
- Airfoil: wing root: NACA 63-618, wing tip: NACA 63-612
- Empty weight: 187 kg (412 lb)
- Gross weight: 310 kg (684 lb)

Performance

- Never exceed speed: 249 km/h (155 mph, 135 kn)
- Maximum glide ratio: 35:1 at 50 mph (80 km/h)
- Rate of sink: 0.61 m/s (120 ft/min) at 46 mph (74 km/h)
- Wing loading: 27.6 kg/m^{2} (5.65 lb/sq ft)

== See also ==
Related development

- Tervamäki ATE-3, a homebuilt autogyro that recycled an Utu nose section

Related lists

- List of gliders
