= PIK-15 =

Finnish light aircraft

PIK-15 Hinu
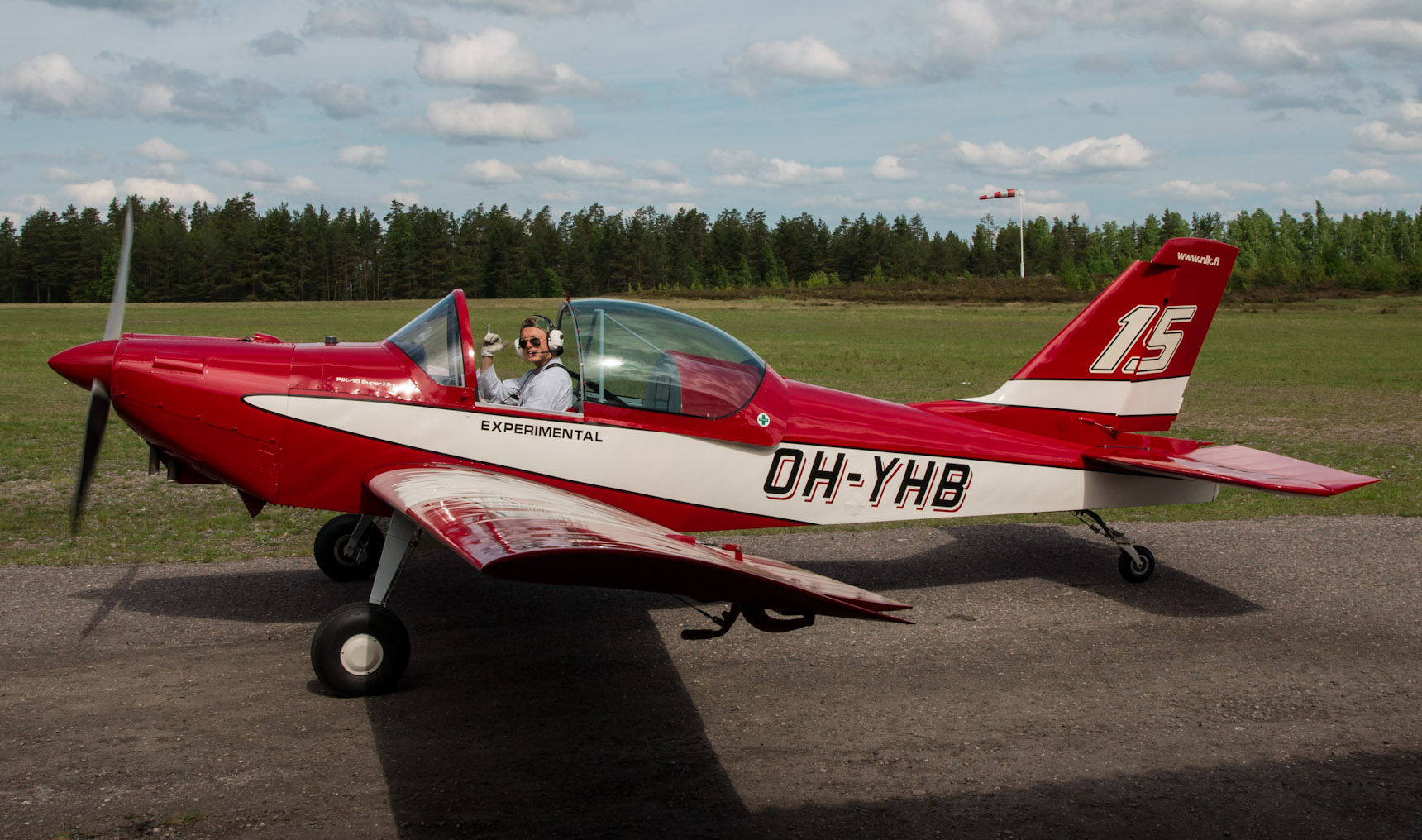

General information
- Type: Glider tug
- National origin: Finland
- Manufacturer: Polyteknikkojen Ilmailukerho
- Designer: Kai Mellen, Ilkka Lounamaa and Jussi Rinta
- Number built: 7

History
- First flight: 29 August 1964

The PIK-15 Hinu is a light aircraft developed in Finland in the 1960s for use as a glider tug. It was a low-wing cantilever monoplane of conventional design with an enclosed cockpit and fixed, tailwheel undercarriage. The cockpit had two seats, side-by-side, and the PIK-15 was intended to have a secondary role as a trainer. Construction was of wood throughout.

Design work began in 1960, with the first prototype built two years later and flying on 29 August 1964. Six examples were listed on the Finnish Civil Aviation Authority registry in 2011.

== Specifications (prototype, with low-pitch propeller) ==
Data from Jane's All the World's Aircraft 1965–66

General characteristics

- Crew: 1
- Capacity: 1 passenger or instructor
- Length: 6.60 m (21 ft 8 in)
- Wingspan: 10.00 m (32 ft 10 in)
- Height: 2.03 m (6 ft 8 in)
- Wing area: 14.0 m^{2} (151 sq ft)
- Aspect ratio: 7.15:1
- Airfoil: NACA 2415 at root, NACA 4409R at tip
- Empty weight: 493 kg (1,087 lb)
- Max takeoff weight: 765 kg (1,687 lb)
- Fuel capacity: 110 L (24 imp gal; 29 US gal)
- Powerplant: 1 × Lycoming O-320-A2B air-cooled flat-four, 110 kW (150 hp)

Performance

- Maximum speed: 190 km/h (120 mph, 100 kn)
- Cruise speed: 170 km/h (110 mph, 92 kn)
- Stall speed: 81 km/h (50 mph, 44 kn) (flaps down)
- Never exceed speed: 300 km/h (190 mph, 160 kn)
- Rate of climb: 7.0 m/s (1,380 ft/min)
- Take off run to 15 m (50 ft): 150 m (492 ft)
- Landing run from 15 m (50 ft): 150 m (492 ft)
