= Tervamäki ATE-3 =

1960s homebuilt autogyro from Finland

ATE-3

General information
- Type: Recreational autogyro
- National origin: Finland
- Manufacturer: homebuilt
- Designer: Jukka Tervamäki and Aulis Eerola
- Number built: at least 4

History
- First flight: 11 May 1968
- Developed into: Tervamäki JT-5; VPM MT-7

The Tervamäki ATE-3 (also known as the Tervamäki-Eerola ATE-3) is a single-seat autogyro developed in Finland by Jukka Tervamäki and Aulis Eerola in the late 1960s and whose plans were distributed for amateur construction. Other than the designers' own prototype, at least three others were built in Finland and Denmark, The designation stands for Autogyro Tervamäki Eerola, and followed Tervamäki's JT-1 and JT-2 designs. An ATE-3 played a prominent role in a Finnish gangster film of 1969, Leikkikalugangsteri.

== Design ==
The ATE-3 is a Bensen-style autogyro, with a fuselage of welded steel tube. (Tervamäki had spent summer 1958 as a graduate student working at Bensen's factory.) It has a single seat for the pilot, behind which is the rotor mast, and a piston engine driving a pusher propeller. The two-bladed propeller, two-bladed main rotor, and the empennage are all made of fibreglass. It was equipped with a mechanism to pre-rotate the main rotor.

The structure throughout was metal and composite materials, with Tervamäki specifically drawing attention in one of his articles about the aircraft that no wood was used in any part of it.

On Tervamäki's and Eerola's prototype, the forward fuselage was partially enclosed in a fibreglass pod, which was salvaged from a Fibera KK-1e Utu sailplane, along with the windscreen, pilot's seat, and instrument panel. On this prototype, as well as on two other examples, the cockpit was left open (unlike the Utu's fully enclosed cockpit), but at least one example was built without a cockpit pod. Tervamäki noted that the re-used sailplane nose actually added unnecessary weight to the ATE-3, since it was built to tolerate stresses of 6 Gs, while the autogyro could only achieve 2.5 Gs. Its structure also complicated the ATE-3's fuel tank design. The prototype also used parts scavenged from a variety of other sources; motorcycle components were repurposed for parts of the undercarriage, and the throttle and pre-rotation levers came from marine engine controls.

Tervamäki and Eerola tested three different tail designs on the prototype. It first flew with a conventional tail, but this was later replaced with a fin and rudder only. The final configuration was a V-tail, which Tervamäki recalled offered the best longitudinal stability (that is, was the most resistant to pilot-induced oscillations), at the expense of lateral stability.

== Development ==
Tervamäki and Eerola began design work on the ATE-3 in May 1966. The design of the aircraft used computer modelling to determine the optimum dimensions for a one-person autogyro that would optimise its flight performance. Within the computer model, the designers were able to vary parameters that included the diameter, chord, and airfoil of the rotor, the pitch, twist, and taper of the blades, plus overall characteristics such as the parasite drag of the fuselage, the gross weight of the aircraft, and the power of the engine. They ran computations on around fifty different permutations of the design. When the aircraft flew, Tervamäki and Eerola discovered that the computer models had been too optimistic, because they were based on drag values that were not attained in real life.

The shape of the original fin and rudder were inspired by the looks of the Wallis WA-116 autogyro that had featured in the recent James Bond film You Only Live Twice. Construction began in September 1968.

The powerplant was originally to have been a refurbished McCulloch O-100-1 drone engine, but when the engine vendor was unresponsive, Tervamäki and Eerola opted for a racing-modified Volkswagen automotive engine.

The prototype, registered OH-XYV, first flew on 11 May 1968. (Note: Sport Aviation gives a different date for the first flight: 1 May.) The tail unit was modified in November 1969 to delete the horizontal stabilisers from the design, and to add an enlarged fin. The original 6.5-metre (21 ft 4 in) diameter rotor blades were replaced with a 7-metre (23 ft 0 in) rotor instead. The V-tail that was fitted to the aircraft was chosen to maximise longitudinal stability after Tervamäki and Eerola were asked to help the Finnish aviation authorities investigate the fatal crash of a Bensen B-8M at Pori. Concluding that the accident had resulted from pilot-induced oscillation, they modified the ATE-3 to increase its dynamic stability. They chose a V-tail to give the aircraft the largest practical tail surfaces while still preserving sufficient clearance for the main rotor.

Tervamäki and Eerola flew their ATE-3 for three years before they sold it to an aero club in Kokkola. During this time, Eerola flew the aircraft for its scenes in Leikkikalugangsteri. By 1969, they had also presented the ATE-3 at two airshows in Finland, and before they sold it, at an Experimental Aircraft Association European fly-in at Gothenburg. The latter appearance was noteworthy as one of the few occasions that a Finnish-built aircraft had been presented internationally at the time.

In addition to selling plans to the design, Tervamäki also sold prefabricated rotor blades. Although their mountings were specific to the ATE-3, they could be easily adapted to Bensen rotor heads.

The ATE-3 provided the basis for Tervamäki's later autogyro designs, the JT-5 and MT-7.

== Specifications (with second tail configuration and 7-metre rotor) ==
Data from Taylor 1974, p. 41

General characteristics

- Crew: one pilot
- Length: 3.20 m (10 ft 6 in)
- Empty weight: 150 kg (331 lb)
- Max takeoff weight: 260 kg (573 lb)
- Powerplant: 1 × Volkswagen four-cylinder, horizontally-opposed, air-cooled automotive engine, 56 kW (75 hp)
- Main rotor diameter: 7 m (23 ft 0 in)
- Main rotor area: 38.5 m^{2} (414 sq ft)

Performance

- Maximum speed: 140 km/h (87 mph, 76 kn)
- Cruise speed: 110 km/h (68 mph, 59 kn)
- Range: 300 km (190 mi, 160 nmi)
- Rate of climb: 3 m/s (590 ft/min)
