= PIK-26 =

Finnish low-wing monoplane

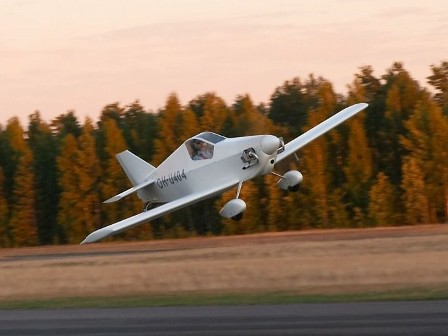
- PIK-26 Mini-Sytky and Pilot/Builder Janne Laurinen.

General information
- Type: Ultralight aircraft
- Manufacturer: PIK
- Designer: Kai Mellen
- Number built: 6 in Finland

History
- First flight: 1996

PIK-26 Mini-Sytky is a low-wing monoplane, conventional landing gear aircraft. Designed by the Finnish aircraft designer Kai Mellen. Its high performance allows it to cruise at 173 km/h while burning 7 litres/hour. Several aircraft of this design are now flying.

The PIK-26 is mainly constructed from wood. While the skins are made of birch plywood, and the spars of pine, the wing ribs and some fuselage ribs are made of PVC foam. Construction time for the PIK-26 is about 2,300 hours.

== Specifications (PIK-26 Mini-Sytky) ==
General characteristics

- Crew: 1
- Capacity: 106 kg (234 lb)
- Length: 4.33 m (14 ft 2 in) length may vary due to engine type and engine installation.
- Wingspan: 5.24 m (17 ft 2 in)
- Height: 1.22 m (4 ft 0 in)
- Wing area: 5.94 m^{2} (63.9 sq ft)
- Aspect ratio: 4.62
- Airfoil: GAW-2 / NACA LS(1)-0413
- Gross weight: 250 kg (551 lb)
- Fuel capacity: 27 L (7.1 US gal; 5.9 imp gal)
- Powerplant: 1 × Citroen Visa or Mosler MMCB 2-cylinder air-cooled horizontally-opposed piston engine, 26 kW (35 hp) Both have same power
- Propellers: 2-bladed fixed-pitch propeller, 1.22 m (4 ft 0 in) diameter

Performance

- Stall speed: 63 km/h (39 mph, 34 kn)
- Never exceed speed: 190 km/h (120 mph, 100 kn)
- Range: 450 km (280 mi, 240 nmi) (with 45 min reserve)
- Service ceiling: 3,300 m (10,800 ft)
- Rate of climb: 3.2 m/s (630 ft/min)
- Fuel consumption: 7 L/h (1.8 gal/h; 1.5 imp gal/h)
- Take-off run: 170 m (558 ft)
- Landing run: 250 m (820 ft)
