= PIK-13 =

General information
- Type: Competition sailplane
- National origin: Finland
- Manufacturer: Polyteknikkojen Ilmailukerho
- Number built: 1

History
- First flight: 1954

The PIK-13 was a sailplane constructed in Finland to compete in the 1954 World Gliding Championships, held at Camphill Farm, Great Hucklow, UK. It was a conventional mid-wing design of "workmanlike" construction and underwent five test flights in the course of 1954 before its entry in the competition.

In the championships, the PIK-13 was flown by Antti Koskisen, who was placed 16th with 931 points. The PIK-13 was destroyed in an accident on 26 March 1956 when the control stick broke in flight. Pilot Jorma Jalkanen parachuted to safety.

== Specifications ==
Data from Jane's all the World's Aircraft 1955-56

General characteristics

- Length: 7.3 m (23 ft 11 in)
- Wingspan: 17.6 m (57 ft 9 in)
- Height: 1.55 m (5 ft 1 in)
- Wing area: 14.6 m^{2} (157 sq ft)
- Aspect ratio: 21
- Airfoil: root:Göttingen 549, tip:Göttingen 693
- Empty weight: 197 kg (434 lb)
- Gross weight: 300 kg (661 lb)

Performance

- Never exceed speed: 250 km/h (160 mph, 130 kn)
- Auto-tow maximum speed:115 km/h (71 mph; 62 kn)
- Aero-tow maximum speed:130 km/h (81 mph; 70 kn)
- g limits: +8
- Maximum glide ratio: 33:1 at 85 km/h (53 mph; 46 kn)
- Rate of sink: 0.7 m/s (140 ft/min) at 62 km/h (39 mph; 33 kn)
- Wing loading: 20.5 kg/m^{2} (4.2 lb/sq ft)
