= Harakka =

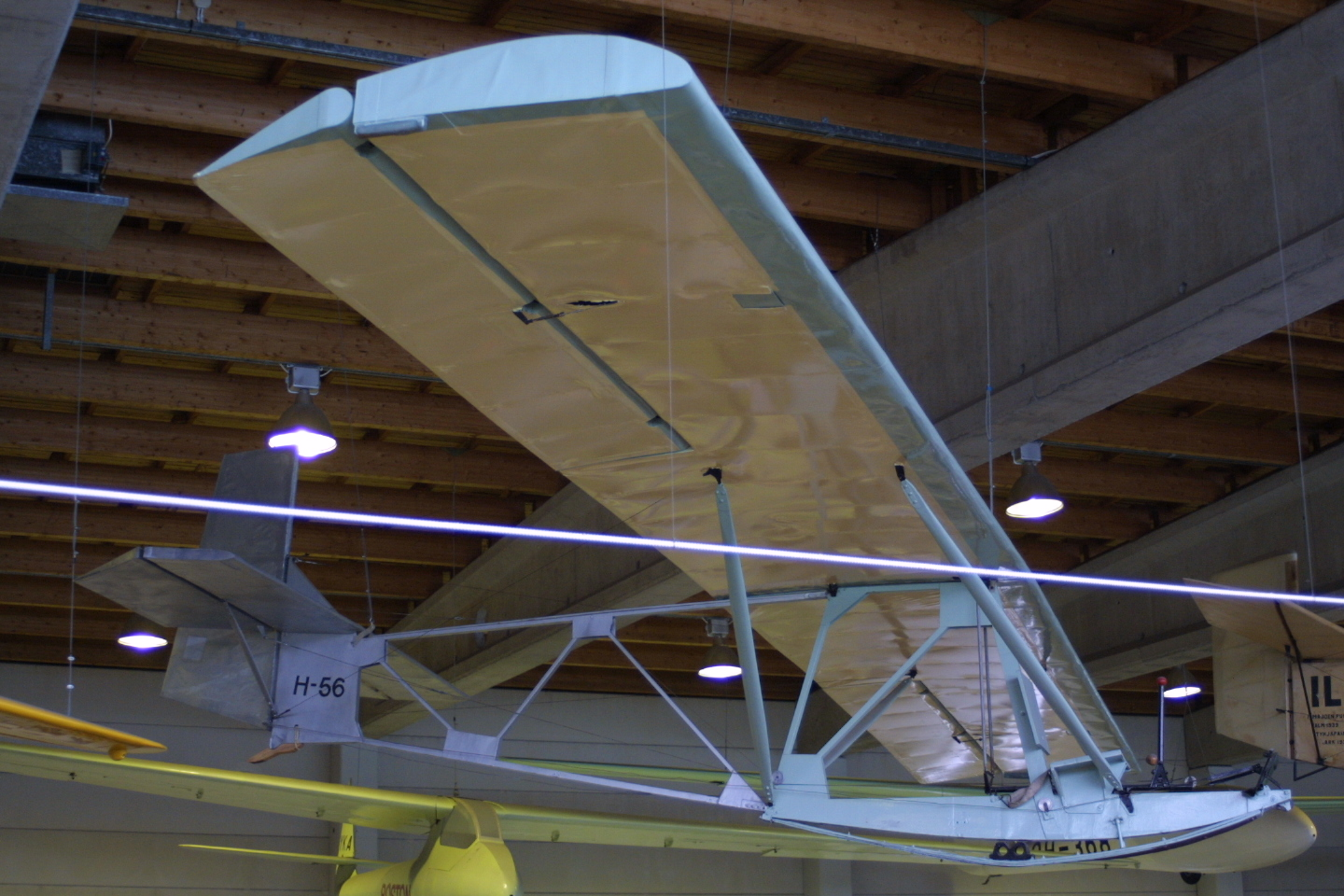
- Harakka II glider at Suomen Ilmailumuseo (Finnish Aviation Museum), 2001

General information
- Type: Primary glider
- National origin: Finland

History
- First flight: February 1945

The Harakka ("European magpie") was a primary glider produced for pilot training in Finland in the 1940s.

== Development ==
Its design was typical of this class of aircraft, a "keel" with a pilot's seat suspended beneath a high, strut-braced monoplane wing, and carrying a conventional empennage at the end of an open framework. First flown in February 1945, the type was built from plans by Finnish gliding clubs and soon replaced earlier primary gliders such as the Grunau 9, becoming a standard piece of equipment in the clubs.

In 1946, Raimo Häkkinen and Juhani Heinonen from Polyteknikkojen Ilmailukerho redesigned the Harakka to strengthen it. This improved version became known as the Harakka II or PIK-7. In 1948, a single example of a more radically redesigned version designated Harakka III flew. This had the framework that supported the tail replaced by a single boom.

Examples of the Harakka I and Harakka II are preserved at the Suomen ilmailumuseo and the Karhulan ilmailukerho Aviation Museum, with the sole Harakka III also preserved at the latter museum.

== Variants ==
- Harakka I - initial version (based on Oleg Antonov's Us-4 a.k.a. Antonov A-1)
- Harakka II - strengthened version (several dozen built)
- Harakka III - version with redesigned tail (1 built)

== Specifications (Harakka II) ==
Data from "Harakka II (H-57)"

General characteristics

- Crew: One pilot
- Length: 5.72 m (18 ft 9 in)
- Wingspan: 10.60 m (34 ft 9 in)
- Height: 1.30 m (4 ft 3 in)
- Wing area: 15 m^{2} (161 sq ft)
- Empty weight: 92 kg (200 lb)
- Gross weight: 200 kg (440 lb)

Performance

- Maximum speed: 117 km/h (73 mph, 63 kn)
- Maximum glide ratio: 10.5:1
- Rate of sink: 1.2 m/s (236 ft/min)

== See also ==
- Antonov A-1
