= Antonov A-2 =

General information
- Type: Training glider
- National origin: USSR
- Designer: Oleg Konstantinovich Antonov
- Number built: ca. 2,300

History
- First flight: 1936

The Antonov A-2 and related designs were a family of two-seat training gliders produced in the Soviet Union in the 1930s and 1940s, all derived from the single-seat Antonov A-1 family. They were produced in large numbers, with at least 2,300 built by 1937, and together with the single-seaters, production exceeded 7,600 by the same year.

Like the A-1, the A-2 was a minimalist primary glider, with a conventional tail mounted on a boom and a strut-braced monoplane wing, mounted parasol-fashion. However, while the single-seat primary gliders featured wings of constant chord, the two-seaters used the longer-span, tapered wings that had been developed for the soaring versions of the single-seat family (P-s1 and P-s2). The other major difference was the design of the cockpit gondola. The single-seaters featured an aerodynamic fairing that slid on and off to provide access to the pilot's seat. The two-seaters, however, had a permanently fixed cockpit pod that seated the pilot and instructor in tandem, open cockpits, each with a small windscreen The rear cockpit was located directly beneath the wing and was accessed via a door on the port side of the gondola. Apart from the change in gondola, all other components remained interchangeable with the Ps-2

== Variants ==
In each case, the "s" stands for serii (серии – "series")

Uchebnyi (Учебный – "Trainer")

- U-s5 (У-с5)
- U-s6 (У-с6)

== Specifications (U-s5) ==
Data from Shushurin 1938, 67

General characteristics

- Crew: two, pilot and instructor
- Length: 5.80 m (19 ft 0 in)
- Wingspan: 13.80 m (45 ft 3 in)
- Height: 1.70 m (5 ft 7 in)
- Wing area: 17.1 m^{2} (184 sq ft)
- Empty weight: 120 kg (264 lb)
- Gross weight: 264 kg (581 lb)

Performance

- Maximum speed: 70 km/h (40 mph, 35 kn)
- Rate of sink: 1.1 m/s (220 ft/min)
