= Museum of Turkish Aeronautical Association =

- Türk Hava Kurumu Müzesi
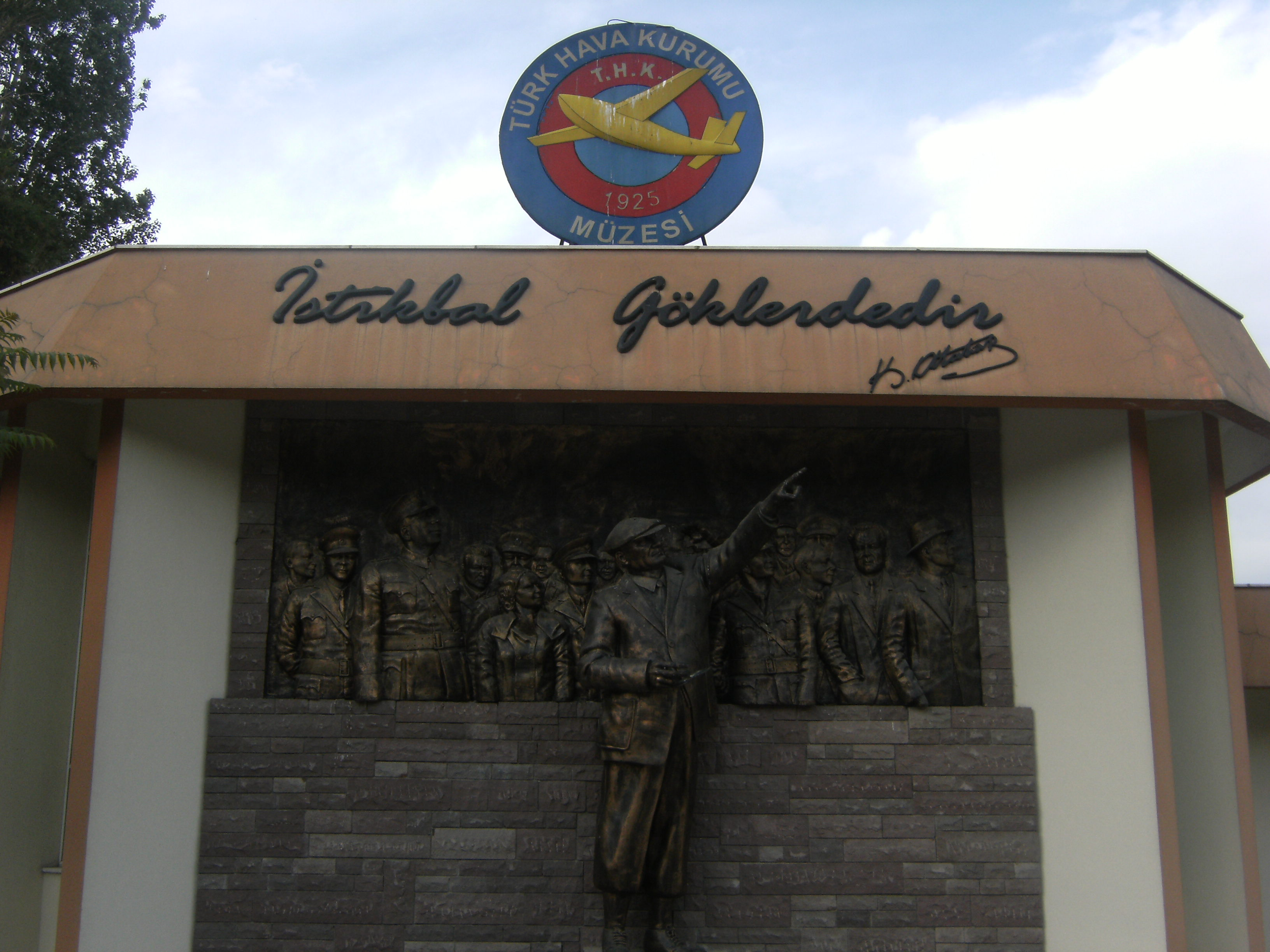
- THK Museum entrance

- Location of THK Museum in Turkey
- Established: May 19, 2002
- Location: Altındağ, Ankara, Turkey
- Coordinates: 39°56′18″N 32°50′31″E
- Type: Aviation
- Visitors: around 15,000 yearly
- Owner: Turkish Aeronautical Association (THK)

The Museum of Turkish Aeronautical Association (Turkish: Türk Hava Kurumu Müzesi), shortly THK Museum, is a museum owned by the Turkish Aeronautical Association (THK) in Altındağ, Ankara dedicated to the civil aviation in Turkey.

== Location and access ==
The museum is located at Hipodrom Cad. 2, Ulus, Ankara. It is open everyday but Mondays between 9:00–18:00 in winter months and 10:00–19:00 in summer time, and receives around 15,000 visitors annually.

== Museum ==
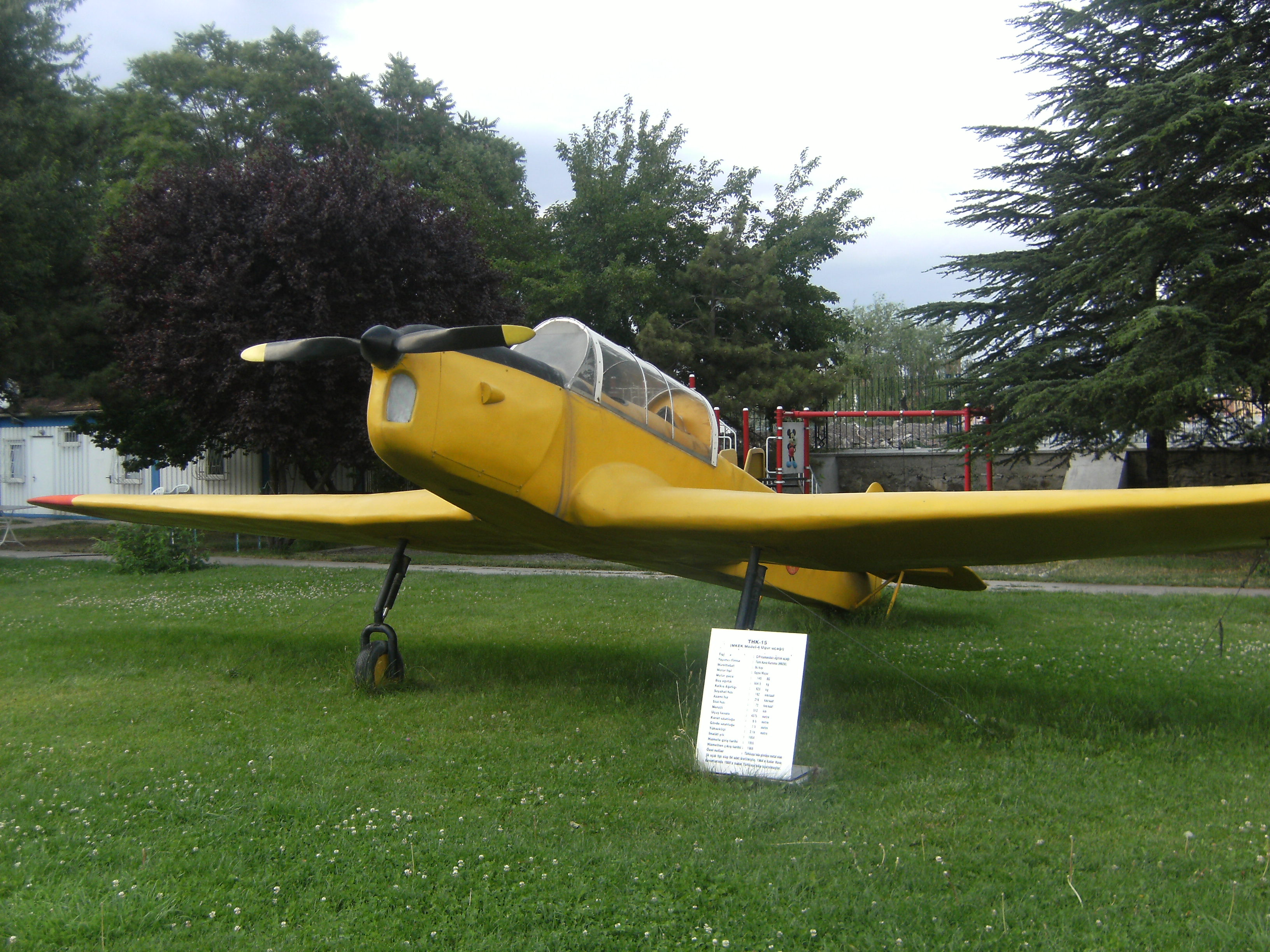
Aircraft THK-15.

Established on May 19, 2002, the museum covers an open-air exhibition area of 5,294 m^{2} (56,980 sq ft), and is housed in a building of 287 m^{2} (3,090 sq ft). The historic parachute tower is situated within the museum's yard, where original and replica aircraft are on display. The museum building holds various documents, photos and objects related to the history of civil aviation in Turkey and the world.

Photos of the Turkey's first aircraft factory, TOMTAŞ (which was in production in the 1920s), diverse uniforms, medals and decorations used by the THK (Türk Hava Kurumu), stamps printed for the THK, and mockups of the THK's training facilities in other cities are on display in the museum. Additionally, the museum contains mockups related to the flying tests carried out by the 17th-century Ottoman figures Lagari Hasan Çelebi and Hezarfen Ahmet Çelebi.

== Parachute tower ==
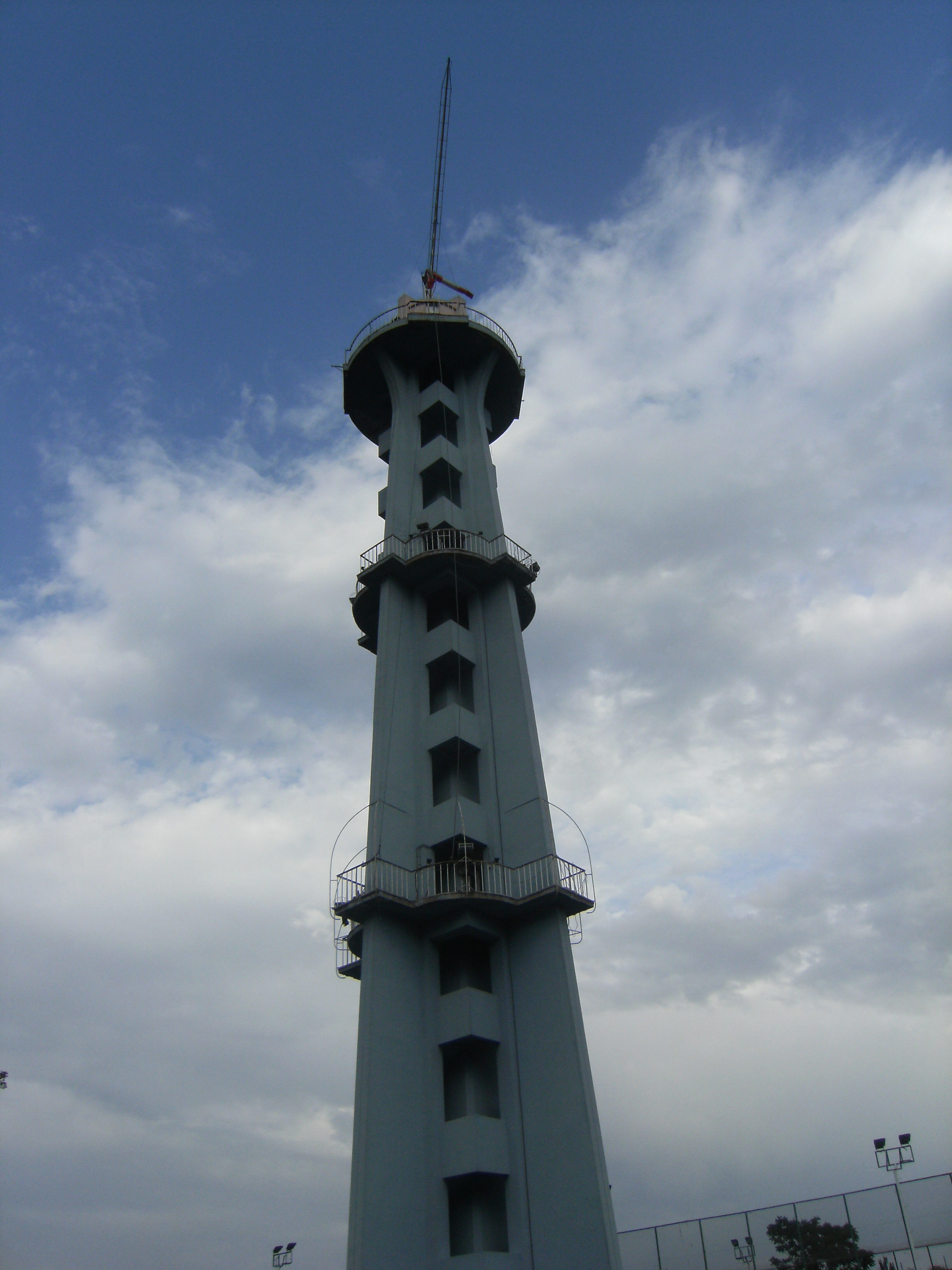
Parachute tower

The parachute tower was built by Turkish and Russian engineers in 1937. The 41.10 m (134.8 ft)-high tower conforms to the standards of the Fédération Aéronautique Internationale (FAI). It offers recreational parachute jumping between May and October. The jumping deck is situated on the third floor at 37.90 m (124.3 ft), reached by stairs or elevator. Two cranes are available for holding the parachute of the jumper. Healthy people over age sixteen, weighing between 45–90 kg (99–198 lb), are allowed to parachute jump under the guidance of instructors.

An identical parachute tower is located in İzmir, Turkey.

== See also ==
- Istanbul Aviation Museum
- Ankara Aviation Museum
