= Polyteknikkojen Ilmailukerho =

Student flying club of the Aalto University

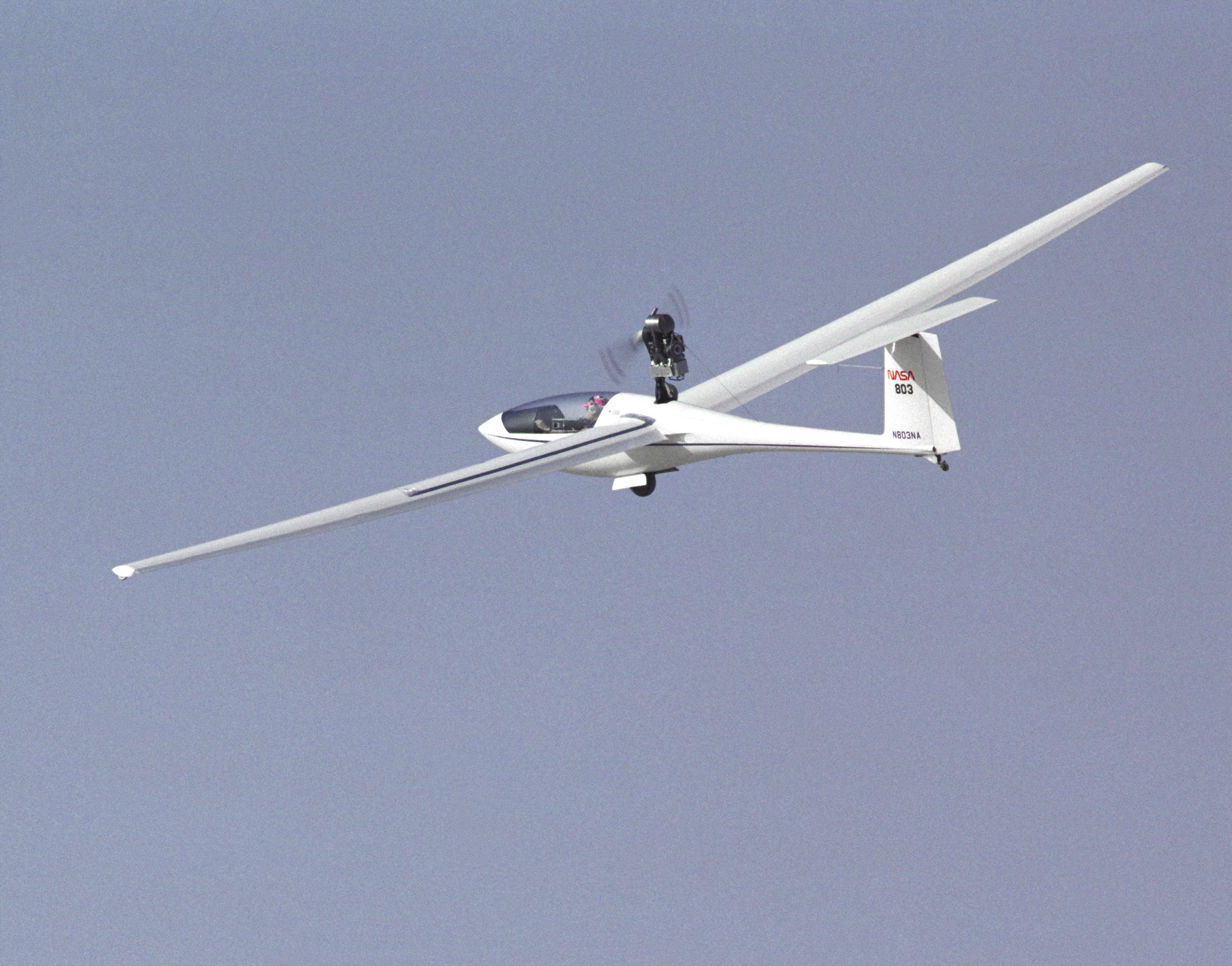
PIK20

Polyteknikkojen Ilmailukerho (PIK) is the student flying club of the Aalto University. As well as a flying club, it develops light aircraft and gliders, often on a small scale but sometimes its designs have been produced in quantity. Approximately 536 aircraft have been built by the organisation and its sub-contractors. It is similar to the Akafliegs of German universities in that students make designs with advice from staff to give practical experience before seeking employment.

== History ==
It was formed on March 26, 1931. For the first two years, the club operated first as the "Aviation Scouts" and then as the "Polytechnic Aviation Club". It was originally part of the Helsinki Institute of Technology before the merger in 2010 with the Helsinki School of Economics, and the University of Art and Design Helsinki to create Aalto University. The club is based at Otaniemi, Espoo

== Equipment ==
The club owns aircraft that members can rent. Currently, PIK has one motor-glider and five sailplanes: Grob 103, DG-500, Rolladen-Schneider LS8, Rolladen-Schneider LS4, Grob G102 Astir. The gliding operation is based at Räyskälä and light aircraft are also flown from Malmi Airport near Helsinki. It uses a PIK-23 as a tow-plane. The light aircraft operation owns a Diamond DA-40, Cessna 152 and PIK-23.

== Gliders ==
Club members designed a series of gliders including:

- PIK-1 1938; not built because of World War 2
- PIK-2 primary glider 1938; not built because of World War 2
- PIK-3a Kanttikolmonen Design started 1942, first flew 1950 (1st production PIK design) Four built
- PIK-3c Kajava 1957
- PIK-4 primary glider 1944; not built because of World War 2
- PIK-5 Cumulus 1945; first flew 1946. 27 gliders built
- PIK-6 1946; not built because of lack of funds
- PIK-7 Harakka primary glider; 57 built
- PIK-10 motorized version of the Grunau Baby, flew for the first time in 1949
- PIK-12 (two-seat :Ilkka Lounamaa; first flew 1956) Four built
- PIK-13 1953–1954 Open Class
- PIK-14 1956; not built, resources diverted to PIK-3c
- PIK-16 Vasama 1959, first flew 1961
- PIK-17a Tumppi Two built
- PIK-17b Tintti
- PIK-20 Tiu A, B, D, E
- PIK-22 Two-seater, uncompleted
- PIK-24 Pileus motorglider; an RF-4D with wings of the PIK-20.
- PIK-30 motorglider

The PIK-3 was designed by Lars Norrmen and Ilkka Lounama and first flew in 1950. It became widely used in Finnish gliding clubs. 40 were built.

The PIK-16 Vasama (or Arrow) was designed by Tuomo Tervo, Jorma Jalkenen and Kurt Hedström. A PIK-16C took third place in the standard class in the World Gliding Championships in 1963. It was put into series production by KK Lehtovaara O/Y which built 56.

The PIK-20 "Tiu" was designed by a team led by a student, Pekka Tammi, as part of his diploma thesis from 1971 to 1973 and guided by Ilkka Rantasalo and Raimo Nurminen. The first flight was in 1973. It was produced by initially by Molino O/Y which was taken over by Eiri-Avion O/Y in 1974 but continued production. PIK-20 gliders won the first three places at the standard class at the World Gliding Championships in 1976. 409 PIK-20 gliders of all types were built by 1981, of which 85% were exported. The manufacturing rights for the 20E were sold in 1980 to the French company Siren.

== Powered aircraft ==
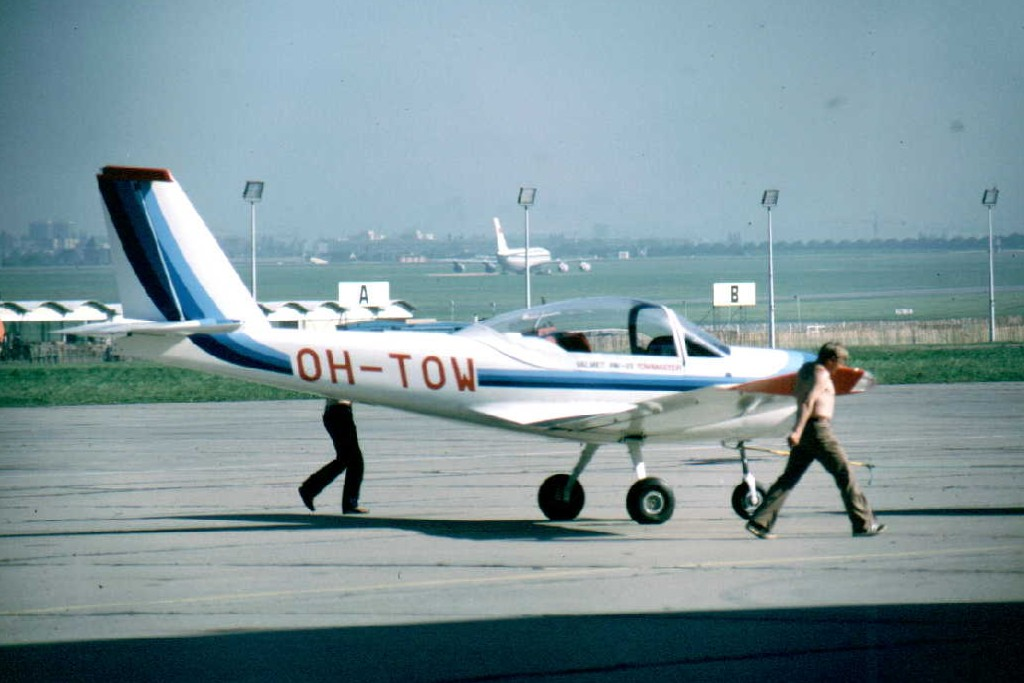
PIK-23 Towmaster

- PIK-8 two-seater in wood construction, the design was not built
- PIK-9 wooden single-seat trainer airplane. Design only
- PIK-11 Tumppu A single-seater. First flew for the first time in 1953; four were built.
- PIK-15 Hinu Two-seat towing and trainer. First flight in 1962. Seven built in series at Valmet
- PIK-18 Sytky 1st flew 9/7/1976 Volkswagen engine
- PIK-19 Muhinu Flew 1972; Only one built because a lack of a manufacturer
- PIK-21 Super-Sytky 1st flew 16/5/1981 Three built
- Valmet PIK-23 Towmaster Two built. First flight 1982
- PIK-25 Varttimarkka 1st flew 21/6/2007 Two-seater designed for mass production but regulations delayed project for 22 years
- PIK-26 Ultralight single-seater; first flew 10/8/1996; Four built
- PIK-27 Sehinu glider tug:1st flew 21/12/2006

== Further information ==
- Rudolf H. Böttcher: PIK, eine Akademische Fliegergruppe in Finnland. Unveröff. Vortragsmanuskript. Akaflieg Karlsruhe, Karlsruhe 1980.
- Vilho Harle: Vinka ja Haukka. Tampere, 1978.
- Jukka Raunio: Lentäjän näkökulma III, PIK-sarjan lentokoneet. J. Raunio, 1995. ISBN 951-96866-1-4.
