= Karhulan ilmailukerho Aviation Museum =

Museum in Kotka, Finland

Coordinates: 60°34′23″N 26°53′36″E

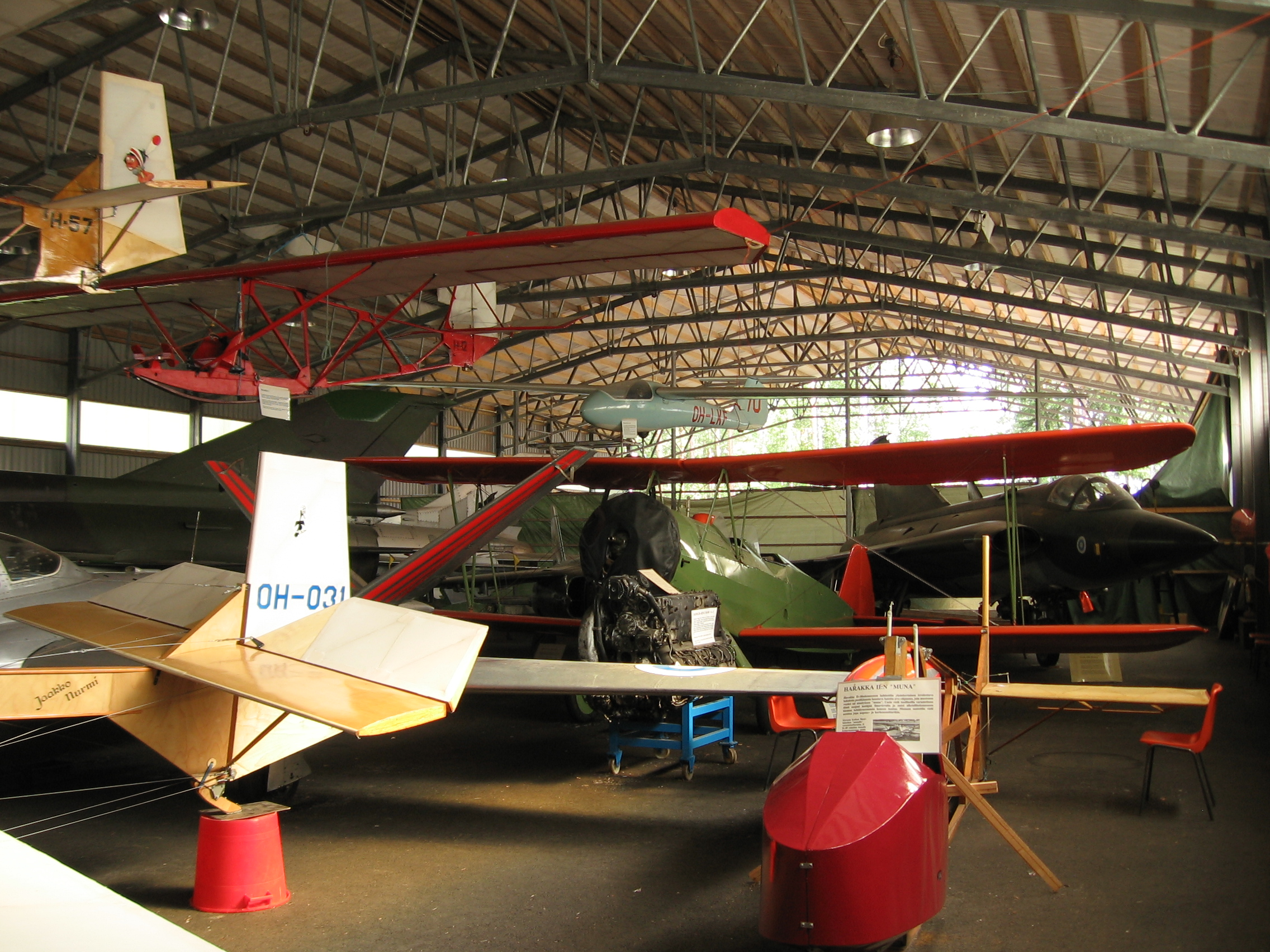
- Inside Karhulan ilmailukerho Aviation Museum
- Established: 1992
- Location: Finland
- Type: Aviation museum
- Website: karhulanilmailukerho.fi/lentomuseo

Karhulan Ilmailukerhon Aviation Museum is a museum specialized in aircraft, located at Kymi Airfield in Kotka, Finland. The museum opened in 1992. A new 600 m^{2} display hall was opened in 1995.

The museum is run by the Karhulan Ilmailukerho who is the guild association for Hävittäjälentolaivue 34.

== Aircraft ==
The museum is in possession of the following aircraft:

- Mikoyan MiG-21F
- Mikoyan MiG-21BIS
- Saab 35 Draken
- Fouga Magister
- Folland Gnat Mk.1
- Focke-Wulf Fw 44 J Stieglitz
- Gloster Gauntlet Mk.II
- Harakka I
- Harakka II
- Muna-Harakka II
- PIK-7 Harakka III
- PIK-5c
- K-8B
- KK-1e Utu
- Moottori-Harakka

A K-7 and a Bocian are currently being restored.

== See also ==
- List of aerospace museums
