= PIK-19 Muhinu =

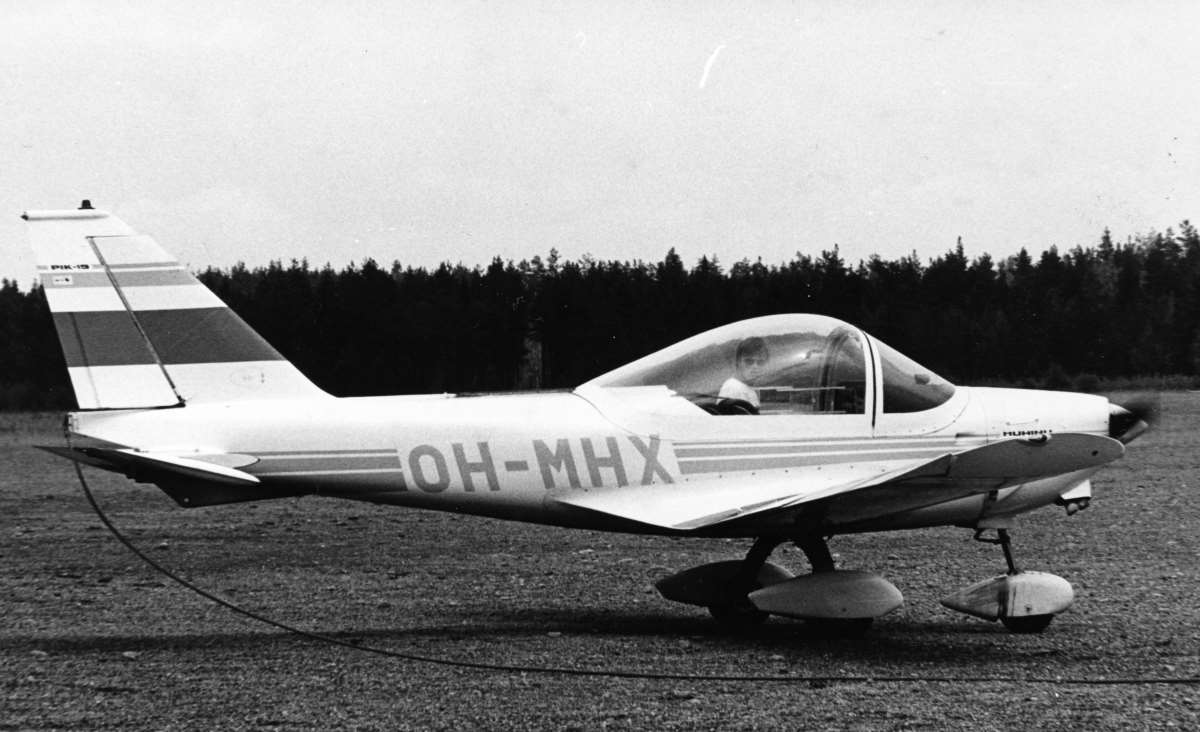

General information
- Type: Glider tug
- National origin: Finland
- Manufacturer: Helsinki University of Technology
- Number built: 1

History
- First flight: 26 March 1972

The PIK-19 Muhinu was a light aircraft developed in Finland in the early 1970s for use as a glider tug and flight trainer. It was a low-wing cantilever monoplane of conventional configuration, with an enclosed cockpit and fixed, tricycle undercarriage. Its construction was of composite materials throughout, a novel approach at the time. When the PIK-19 flew for the first time in 1972, it was only the fourth aircraft in the world made of these materials.

The project was undertaken as a joint venture by the Finnish government and the Helsinki University of Technology. Its "PIK" designation belongs to a sequence of designations applied to the aircraft designed and built by the university's gliding club, Polyteknikkojen Ilmailukerho, although this was not a project by the club. Design work commenced in 1969 under the leadership of Jukka Tervamäki, Ilkka Rantasalo and Pekka Tammi and the prototype flew on 26 March 1972. Plans for production in series were never realised, and the single prototype was the only example ever built. Over the next 21 years, it accumulated 5217 hours of flying time and some 40,000 glider tows. It was destroyed in a crash in June 1994 when the engine failed at low altitude.

== Specifications ==
Data from Jane's All the World's Aircraft 1974-75

General characteristics

- Crew: Two
- Length: 6.90 m (22 ft 8 in)
- Wingspan: 10.00 m (32 ft 10 in)
- Height: 2.60 m (8 ft 6 in)
- Wing area: 14.00 m^{2} (150.7 sq ft)
- Aspect ratio: 7.14
- Airfoil: NACA 63_{2}415
- Empty weight: 560 kg (1,235 lb) equipped
- Max takeoff weight: 840 kg (1,852 lb)
- Fuel capacity: 150 L (33 Imp gal; 40 ?US gal)
- Powerplant: 1 × Lycoming O-320-B2BC flat four, 120 kW (160 hp)
- Propellers: 2-bladed McCauley1A-175/GM-8241 for towing and 1C-172/MGM-7657 for other tasks, Both fixed pitch, metal blades.

Performance

- Maximum speed: 240 km/h (150 mph, 130 kn)
- Cruise speed: 220 km/h (140 mph, 120 kn) maximum, 75% power
- Stall speed: 83 km/h (52 mph, 45 kn) flaps down
- Never exceed speed: 310 km/h (190 mph, 170 kn)
- Range: 950 km (590 mi, 510 nmi) maximum fuel, no reserves, 65% power
- Rate of climb: 7.00 m/s (1,378 ft/min)
- Time to altitude: maximum
- Wing loading: 60.0 kg/m^{2} (12.3 lb/sq ft)
- Take-off to 15 m (50 ft): 240 m (787 ft)
- Landing from 15 m (50 ft): 220 m (722 ft
