= Kymi Airfield =

Kymi Airfield Kymin lentokenttä
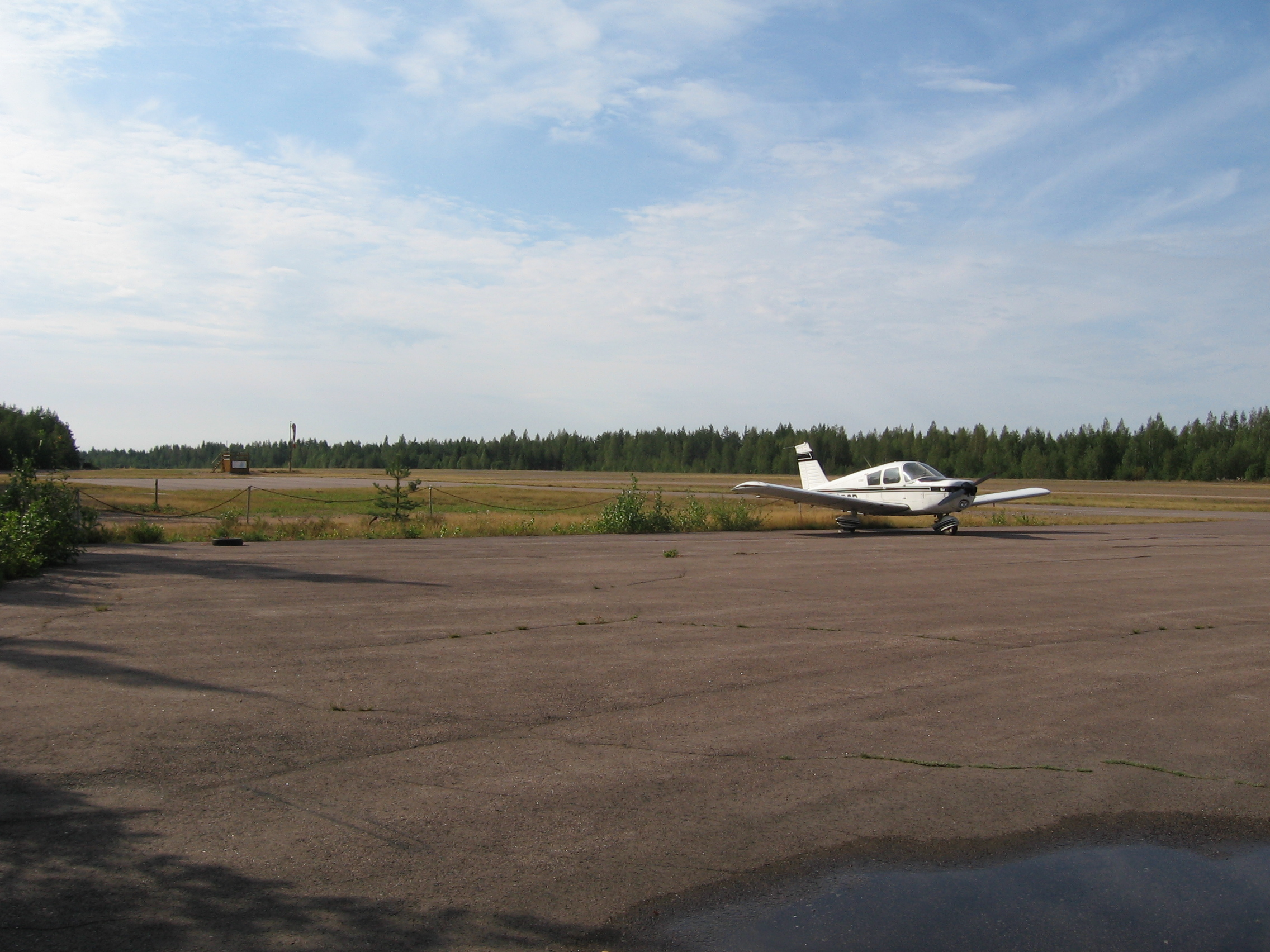
- Kymi Airfield
- IATA: none; ICAO: EFKY

Summary
- Operator: City of Kotka
- Location: Kotka, Finland
- Elevation AMSL: 223 ft / 68 m
- Coordinates: 60°34′17″N 026°53′46″E

Map
- Location within Finland

Runways
Direction	Length		Surface
Direction	m	ft	Surface
16/34	850	2,789	asphalt
- Source: VFR Finland

Kymi Airfield is an airfield in Kotka, Finland. The Karhulan ilmailukerho Aviation Museum is located at the airfield.

== History ==
First airplane landed in field in 1943.

== See also ==
- List of airports in Finland
