= Eiri-Avion PIK-20 =

PIK-20
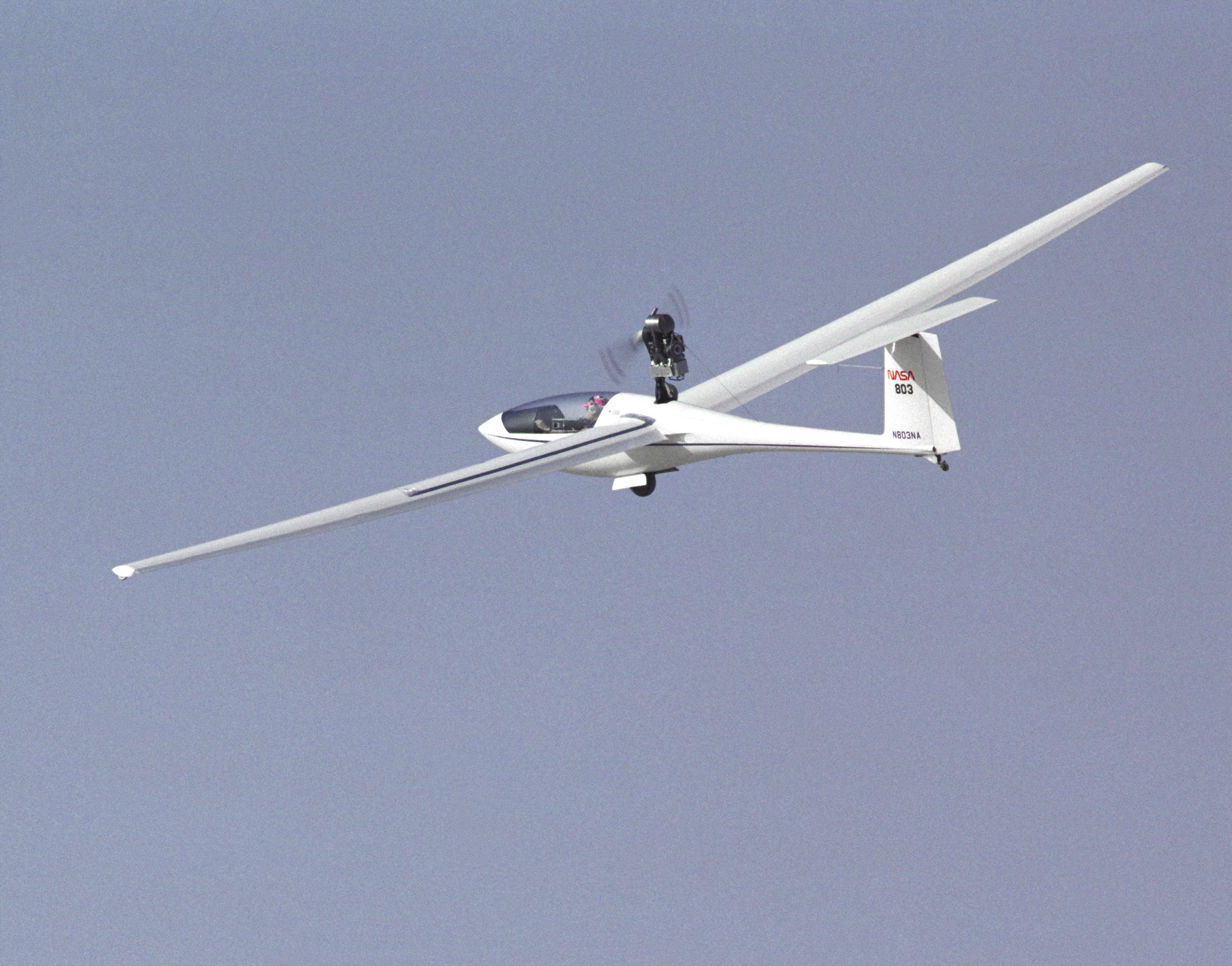
- A self-launching PIK-20E at the Dryden Flight Research Center

General information
- Type: Standard-class (later 15 metre-class) sailplane
- National origin: Finland
- Manufacturer: Eiri-Avion
- Designer: Polyteknikkojen Ilmailukerho
- Number built: over 425

History
- First flight: 10 October 1973

The PIK-20 sailplane was designed at the Helsinki University of Technology by Pekka Tammi, with advice from Ilkka Rantasalo and Raimo Nurminen. The prototype first flew on 10 October 1973. It was produced initially by Molino Oy who were taken over by Eiri-Avion Oy (currently Eirikuva Oy) between 1974 and 1980. Later, production was taken over by the French company, Siren SA, under the name Siren PIK-20.

At first the PIK-20 was classified as a Standard Class glider, which at the time allowed either flaps or air-brakes for landing approach control. The specification of the Standard Class required the air-brakes or flaps to be capable of keeping the speed below the maximum speed in a vertical dive. However at high speed great force was needed to fully lower the flaps and so the PIK-20 was equipped with a geared crank handle.

The first prototype finished 13th in the World Gliding Championships in Waikerie in January 1974 but it performed impressively. (The low placing was caused by a poor decision on the first day of the competition.) This yellow prototype glider (OH-425) can be seen in movie named "Zulu Romeo - Good start" about this 1974 World Gliding Championship. The glider was then produced at the rate of two to three per week.

The rules of the Standard Class were changed again to allow the flaps and ailerons to move together (flaperons) and for intermediate settings of the flaps between landing mode and zero. The result was the PIK-20B which won British, American and Finnish National Championships in 1975. In 1976 Ingo Renner won the World Championship with a PIK-20B and second and third places were also taken by this type. Most owners of PIK-20A converted to the B's flaperon arrangements. Carbon fiber spars later became standard.

Another change in the rules prohibited lift-enhancing devices in the Standard Class; and introduced a racing class or 15-metre class which did permit lift-enhancing devices. As a result, the PIK 20D with trailing-edge flaps was produced for the new 15-metre class.

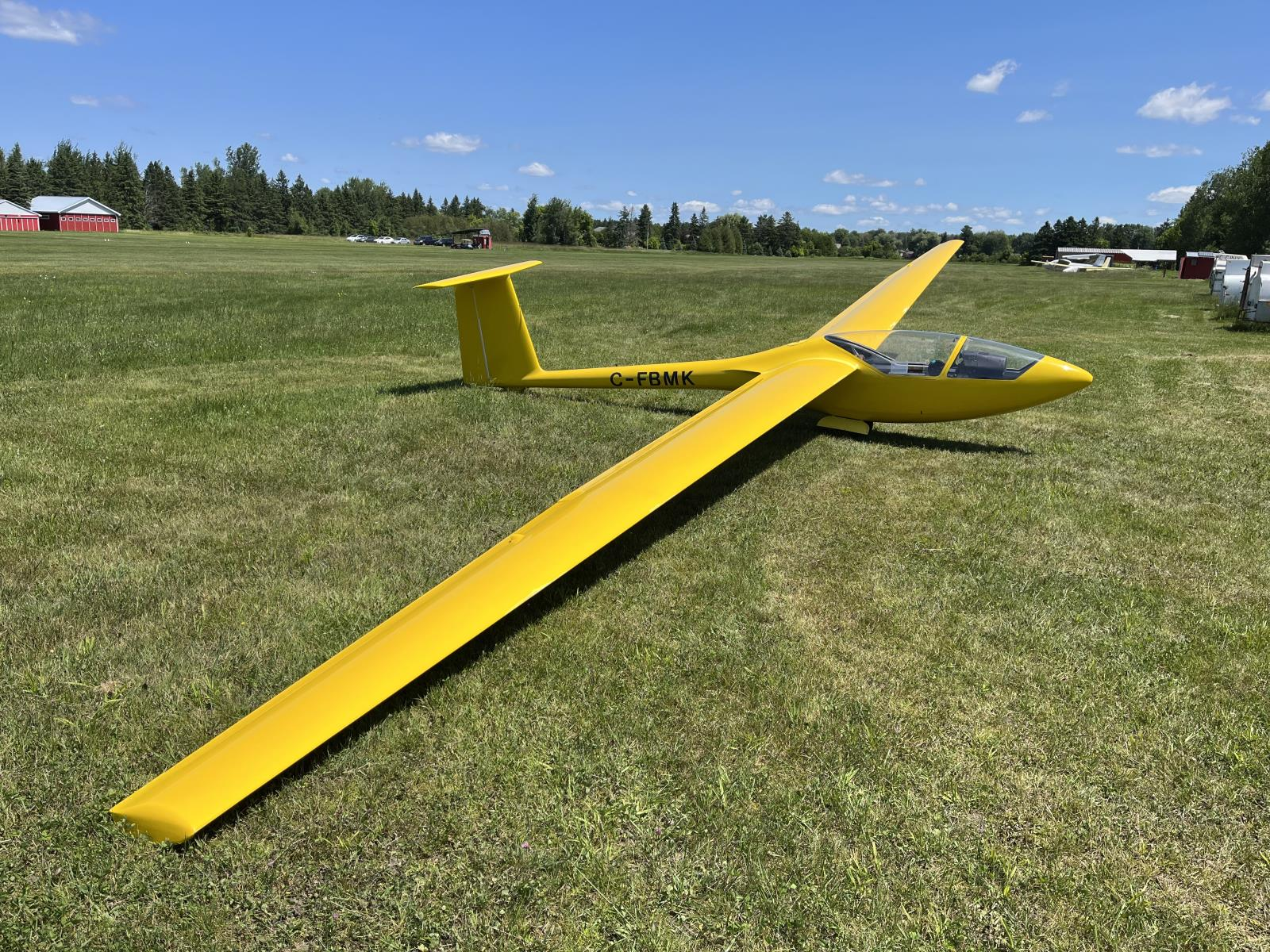
An early production PIK-20 with two-piece canopy and yellow paint.

The PIK-20s were also notable for being conventionally painted rather than using gel-coat. (The prototype was bright yellow.) This type of finish is longer-lasting and simpler to repair.

The name PIK is an acronym for Polyteknikkojen Ilmailukerho, the flying club of the Student Union of Helsinki University of Technology.

A fire in the factory June 1977 dented production briefly but by then 200 gliders had been sold. Production continued until about 1985 with the D and E versions with over 400 examples of the type having been completed.

== Variants ==
PIK 20

Prototype and initial production version. 400 kg gross weight. Retrofit of PIK-20B flap-aileron interconnect permitted under a service bulletin. Retrofit of PIK-20B enlarged water ballast bags and corresponding 450 kg gross weight permitted under a service bulletin.

PIK 20B

Refined standard class sailplane with interconnected flaps and ailerons. Gross weight increased to 450 kg.

PIK 20C

Proposed version with airbrakes and no flaps.

PIK 20D

PIK 20D added conventional Schempp-Hirth airbrakes, carbon reinforcement strips at critical locations in the fuselage, the nose profile was sharpened, the tail-plane was moved forward and fuselage fairings recontoured to reduce drag. The flaps were limited to -12 to +20 degrees. The first flight of the D was in 1976.

PIK 20E

The self-launching PIK-20E is similar to the D model, but has a retractable Rotax 501 that takes 15 turns of a manual crank in the cockpit to deploy or retract. The fuselage is slightly different, with a slight sweep-back of the wings and the tailplane is larger. The modifications to turn the PIK-20 into a motorglider were designed by Jukka Tervamäki and the prototype first flew on 2 October 1976 as the Tervamäki JT-6

PIK 20E II F

Designation for PIK 20Es produced by Siren S.A. in France.

PIK-20F

A PIK-20F had a modified wing profile, reshaped fuselage and a forward opening canopy.

PIK-30

The Issoire Company in France produced a 17-metre PIK-30 version of the E. Unlike the PIK 20, the PIK 30 could not be winch-launched or fly with full negative flaps.

== Specifications (PIK-20D) ==
General characteristics

- Crew: One pilot
- Capacity: 140 kg (310 lb) water ballast
- Length: 6.43 m (21 ft 1 in)
- Wingspan: 15.00 m (49 ft 3 in)
- Height: 1.34 m (4 ft 5 in)
- Wing area: 10.0 m^{2} (108 sq ft)
- Aspect ratio: 22.5
- Empty weight: 225 kg (517 lb)
- Gross weight: 450 kg (990 lb)

Performance

- Maximum speed: 293 km/h (182 mph, 158 kn)
- Maximum glide ratio: 42
- Rate of sink: 0.56 m/s (130 ft/min)
