= List of gliders (P) =

This is a list of gliders/sailplanes of the world, (this reference lists all gliders with references, where available) Note: Any aircraft can glide for a short time, but gliders are designed to glide for longer.

== P ==
=== Pagliani ===
(Armando Pagiani)

- Pagliani Vittoria Armando Pagiani

=== Pajno ===
(Vittorio Pajno)

- Pajno V-1
- Pajno V-½ Rondine
- Pajno V-3

=== Paknys ===
(Antanas Paknys & A. Gysas)

- Paknys P-1 Uodas
- Paknys P-2 (Originally PAGY or PAGY-1 [some confuse P-2 with PAGY-2]
- Paknys PAGY-2 1938, fitted with 18–20 hp engine [sources vary as to conversion to or from motorglider]
- Paknys P-3 Nerija (Spit)
- Paknys P-4 Termikas

=== Pánek ===
(Přemysl Pánek)

- Pánek P-2
- Pánek P-3
- Pánek P-4
- Pánek N-26-V Ostaš 1

=== Pánka (glider constructor) ===
- Pánka 1924 primary

=== Paolini ===
(Sfredo Paolini)

- Paolini SP-38

=== Parker ===
(Raymond H. Parker / Richard H. Johnson)

- Parker RP9 T-Bird
- Parker-Johnson PJ-1 Tiny Mite

=== Parker ===
(W.L. Parker)

- Parker 2nd Ranger

=== Partenavia ===
- Partenavia P-56 Zefiro
- Partenavia Sea Sky

=== Pascoe ===
(E.A. Pascoe)

- Pascoe EP-1 Spruce Goose
- Pascoe EP-2 Super Goose

=== Pavelek ===
(František Pavelek)

- Pavelek P-1 1936 PAVELEK, František
- Pavelek P-2 1937 PAVELEK, František

=== Payne ===
(A. G. Payne)

- Payne Granta

=== Payne ===
(J. H. Payne / Imperial College, London)

- Payne I.C.1

=== Payre ===
(Georges Payre)

- Payre AM-56

=== Peak ===
(The Bedford Sailplane Design Group / Peak Sailplanes Ltd. / P. Mitchelmore)

- Peak 100
- Peak 200

=== Peel ===
(Peel / Peel Glider Boat Corporation, College Point, Queens)

- Peel Z-1 Glider Boat

=== Pelton ===
(Alfred Paul Pelton)

- Pelton Hawk
- Pelton Bat
- Pelton Bronzewing
- Pelton ground training machine

=== Pelzner ===
(Willy Pelzner)

- Pelzner C
- Pelzner Hängegleiter 1920

=== Penrose ===
(Harald J. Penrose)

- Penrose Pegasus Harald J. Penrose

=== Peregrine Sailplanes ===
- Peregrine Sailplanes KR-03 (Puchatek)

=== Perl ===
(Harry Perl)

- Perl PG-130 Penetrator

=== Pešta ===
(František Pešta)

- Pešta Peta-Z

=== Peterson ===
(Max A. Peterson / Peterson Sailplane Corporation)

- Peterson J-4 Javelin
- Peterson MAP-3 Medena

=== Petsuha ===
(A. I. Petsuha)

- Petsuha PAI-6 – (Пьецуха ПАИ-6)

=== Peulet ===
(Henri Peulet / Aéro-Club de Créteil)

- Peulet PC-1 Bigorneau
- Peulet Biplace Marcel Guittard

=== Peyean ===
(K. Peyean)

- Peyean Boot I
- Peyean Boot II
- Peyean Schwalbe

=== Peyronnenc ===
(Pierre Peyronnenc)

- Peyronnenc PP-1

=== Pfitzner ===
(Alexander L. Pfitzner)

- Pfitzner american glider

=== Phoenix Air ===
(Phoenix Air sro., Letrohrad, Czech Republic)

- Phoenix Air Phoenix

=== Piana Canova ===
(Flaminio Piana Canova)

- Piana Canova PC.100
- Piana Canova PC.500

=== Piattelli ===
(Piattelli, Fidia)

- Piattelli PH-3
- Piattelli PH-7

=== Pierce ===
(Percy Pierce)

- Pierce 0-2-1
- Pierce 1909 glider

=== Peyret ===
(Louis Peyret)

- Peyret Alérion Tandem

=== Piermarcucci ===
(Société Piermarcucci / Marcucci, Pier)

- Piermarcucci TST-3
- Piermarcucci TST-8 DM

=== PIK ===
(Polyteknikkojen Ilmailukerho)

- PIK-1
- PIK-2
- PIK-3
- PIK-3a Kanttikolmonen
- PIK-3b
- PIK-3c Kajava
- PIK-4
- PIK-5 Cumulus
- PIK-6
- PIK-7 Harakka
- PIK-12
- PIK-13
- PIK-14
- PIK-16 Vasama
- PIK-17a Tumppi
- PIK-17b Tintti
- PIK-20 Tiu
- PIK-22
- PIK-24 Pileus
- PIK-30

=== Pilatus ===
(Pilatus Aircraft)

- B4

=== Pilcher ===
(Percy Sinclair Pilcher)

- Pilcher Bat 1895
- Pilcher Beetle 1895
- Pilcher Hawk 1897
- Pilcher Triplane 1899

=== Pimoule ===
(J. Pimoule)

- Pimoule 1922 glider

=== Piotrków ===
(Piotrków Secondary School / Piotrkówa Uczniów)

- Piotrków School 1913 glider

=== Piper Aircraft ===
- Piper TG-8
- Piper LBP
- Piper LNP

=== Pipistrel ===
(Pipistrel d.o.o Ajdovščina)

- Pipistrel Apis
- Pipistrel Apis-Bee
- Pipistrel Sinus
- Pipistrel Taurus
- Pipistrel Virus
- Albastar AS 18 – Albastar production

=== Pitrman-Pešta ===
(František Pitrman & František Pešta / Dílny PO MLL Praha, Maniny)

- Pitrman-Pešta PP-1 Tulák 37

=== Planar ===
(Planar Industria Aeronáutica S.A. - Argentina)

- Planar ASK-18 AR

=== Platz ===
(Reinhold Platz – Netherlands)

- Platz Zeilvliegtuig

=== Ploszajski ===
(Jerzy Ploszajski)

- Ploszajski KLS-II

=== Polikarpov ===
(Nikolaj Polikarpov / AMI)

- Polikarpov BDP
- Polikarpov BDP-2
- Polikarpov MP
- Polikarpov PB

=== Politechnika Warszawska ===
(Warsaw Polytechnic)

- Politechnika Warszawska PW-1 ULS
- Politechnika Warszawska PW-2 Gapa
- Politechnika Warszawska PW-2D – Mannschaft LKK – a.k.a. DWLKK PW-2D
- Politechnika Warszawska PW-3 Bakcyl
- Politechnika Warszawska PW-3V
- Politechnika Warszawska PW-4 Pelikan – Mannschaft LKK
- Politechnika Warszawska PW-5 Smyk – Roman Switkiewicz
- Politechnika Warszawska PW-6 – Roman Switkiewicz

=== Polyt ===
(Polyteknisk Flyvegruppe – Polytechnic flying club)

- Polyt I
- Polyt II
- Polyt III
- Polyt IV

=== Poncelet ===
(Paul Poncelet / Société Anonyme Belge de Construction Aéronautique)

- Poncelet Castar – Poncelet, Paul – SABCA (Société Anonyme Belge de Construction Aéronautique)
- Poncelet Vivette – Poncelet, Paul – SABCA (Société Anonyme Belge de Construction Aéronautique)

=== Popa ===
(Ovidiu Popa)

- Popa OP-1 – (Ovidiu Popa)
- Popa OP-22 – (Ovidiu Popa)

=== Popiou ===
(George Popiou)

- Popiou GEP

=== Porte-Pirie ===
(Lieutenant John Cyrill Porte and Lieutenant Pirie)

- Porte-Pirie 1909 glider

=== Posnansky-Fronius ===
(Herman Posnansky & Bob Fronius)

- Posnansky-Fronius PF-1 White Knight

=== Potez ===
(Henry Potez)

- Potez P-VIII

=== Pottier ===
(Avions Pottier)

- Pottier JP 14-34
- Pottier JP 15-40

=== Poznań Aviation Circle ===
(Poznań Aviation Circle Motyl / Michal Bohattrew)

- Poznań Aviation Circle Motyl (Butterfly) No.20 – Second Polish Glider Contest 17 May – 15 June 1925

=== Pratt ===
(Percival Justin Pratt / AMSCO (Aircraft Manufactory and Supply Company)

- Pratt 1929 glider
- Pratt 1934
- Pratt Stunter
- Pratt Two Seater
- Pratt Utility

=== Pratt-Read ===
- Pratt-Read PR-G1
- Pratt Read LNE-1
- Pratt-Read TG-32
- Pratt-Read LBE

=== Preiss ===
See also Schreder

- Preiss RHJ-7
- Preiss RHJ-8
- Preiss RHJ-9
- Preiss RHJ-10

=== Pretoria University ===
- Pretoria University Exulans

=== Princeton ===
- Princeton Sailwing II

=== ProFe ===
(Czech Republic)

- ProFe Banjo
- ProFe Duo Banjo
- ProFe D-8 Moby Dick
- ProFe D-8 Straton
- ProFe D-7 Mini Straton
- ProFe D-10 Tukan

=== Projekt 8 ===
(Projekt 8 I/S – Helge Petersen et al.)

- Projekt 8 Dolphin

=== Prue ===
(Irving Prue)

- Prue 160
- Prue 215
- Prue Two
- Prue IIA
- Prue Standard
- Prue Super Standard
- Prue UHP-1

=== PSU ===
(Pennsylvania State University)

- PSU Griffin

=== Purcell ===
(Thomas H. Purcell Jr.)

- Purcell Sea Sprite

=== Pützer ===
(Alfons Pützer KG)

- Pützer Doppelraab
- Pützer Dohle
- Pützer Elster
- Pützer Motorraab
- Pützer SR.57 Bussard - de:Pützer Bussard
- Pützer MS.60
- Pützer MS.75

=== P.W.S. ===
(Podlaska Wytwórnia Samolotów)

- PWS-101
- PWS-102
- PWS-103

=== Pyshnov ===
(V. S. Pyshnov / AVF – Akademiya Vozdushnogo Flota – air fleet academy (built at the Aviarabotnik glider section))

- Pychnov Strij

=== P.Z.L. ===
(Państwowe Zakłady Lotnicze - State Aviation Works)

- P.Z.L. 22

=== PZL Bielsko ===
- PZL Bielsko SZD-51 Junior
- PZL Bielsko SZD-52 (Amber 15 Crocus)
- PZL Bielsko SZD-54 Perkoz (Grebe)
- PZL Bielsko SZD-55
- PZL Bielsko SZD-56 Diana
- PZL Bielsko SZD-59 Acro

=== PZL Krosno ===
- PZL Krosno KR-02
- PZL Krosno KR-03 Puchatek – Jerzy Krawsczyk and Eugeniusz Pelczar
- Peregrine Sailplanes KR-03 (Puchatek)

=== PZL Mielec ===
- PZL M-3 Pliszka (Wagtail)
