= 1985 in aviation =

This is a list of aviation-related events from 1985.

== Events ==
- Lauda Air begins flight operations as a charter and air taxi service. It began scheduled service in 1987.
- Ryanair is founded, initially as a full-service carrier.
- Emirates is founded, with the help of the Government of Dubai and Pakistan International Airlines.

=== January ===
- January 1
  - In the Iran–Iraq War, the Iraqi Air Force begins the year with a strength of 500 operational aircraft and 40,000 men including air defense troops, while the Islamic Republic of Iran Air Force has 40,000 men but only 60 to 80 operational aircraft.
  - Flying at night in poor weather, Eastern Air Lines Flight 980, a Boeing 727, crashes into Bolivia's Mount Illimani at an altitude of 19,600 feet (6,000 meters), killing all 29 people on board. The wreckage was not discovered until 2016.
  - The United States Government's Civil Aeronautics Board is abolished in accordance with the Airline Deregulation Act of 1978.
- January 5 – Operation Moses – a covert, cooperative effort by the Israel Defense Forces, the Central Intelligence Agency, the United States Embassy in Khartoum, mercenaries, and Sudanese state security forces – comes to an abrupt end when Israeli Prime Minister Shimon Peres reveals its existence during a press conference, prompting the Government of Sudan to terminate it immediately. An airlift of Jews of the Beta Israel community who had fled a famine in Ethiopia and were living in refugee camps in Sudan, Operation Moses since its beginning on November 21, 1984, has evacuated about 8,000 Jews 200 or so at time in over 30 flights by Trans European Airways airliners, flying them from Sudan to Israel via Brussels, Belgium.
- January 18 – A Chinese Antonov An-24 turbo-prop airliner flying from Shanghai to Beijing via Nanjing crashes during an emergency landing at Jinan, China, south of Beijing. Thirty-eight of the 41 people on board perish.
- January 19 — 1985 Cubana de Aviación Ilyushin Il-18 crash
- January 20 – São Paulo–Guarulhos International Airport officially opens in São Paulo, Brazil.
- January 21 – Galaxy Airlines Flight 203, a Lockheed L-188 Electra, crashes immediately after takeoff from Reno-Cannon International Airport in Reno, Nevada, killing 70 of the 71 people on board and damaging a store and seven recreational vehicles parked at a dealership. The lone survivor is a 17-year-old boy who is thrown clear of the aircraft, landing upright on a city street still strapped into his seat.
- January 22 - a U.S. Air Force C-130A 56-0501 Hercules crashed into the Caribbean Sea off the northern coast of Honduras whilst on visual approach to Trujillo airport, killing all 21 people on board.
- January 23 - AIRES Colombia Flight 585 hits a mountain killing all 17 on board.

=== February ===
- February 1
  - Trans World Airlines becomes the first airline to operate an ETOPS (Extended-range Twin-engine Operational Performance Standards) flight. The flight also makes it the first airline to operate a twin-engine jet on scheduled transatlantic services. The aircraft is a Boeing 767.
  - Aeroflot Flight 7841 crashes shortly after takeoff, killing 58 people on board.
- February 11 – Record-setting hot-air balloonist Ben Abruzzo dies along with his wife and his other four passengers when the Cessna 421C he is piloting collides with the tops of trees and crashes at Albuquerque, New Mexico, after Abbruzzo becomes distracted by a baggage door that opens in flight.
- February 19
  - Iberia Flight 610, a Boeing 727-256 named Alhambra de Granada, strikes a television antenna on the summit of Mount Oiz in Biscay, Spain, and crashes, killing all 148 people on board.
  - China Airlines Flight 006, a Boeing 747SP with 274 people on board, miraculously survives a 30,000-foot (9,100 m) plunge over the Pacific Ocean near San Francisco after an engine failure. Twenty-four people are injured, two of them seriously.

=== March ===
- In the Iran–Iraq War, Iraqi Air Force aircraft carry out 158 sorties against Iranian cities over a three-day period.
- March 1 – The Boy Scouts of America officially ends powered aircraft flight in its Aviation Exploring program, citing difficulties with maintaining insurance coverage in the event of an aircraft accident. The decision affects 450 Explorer Posts and over 10,000 Explorer Scouts.
- March 4 – The Iraqi Air Force conducts its first raid against the Iranian nuclear reactor under construction at Bushehr.
- March 10–11 – Islamic Republic of Iran Air Force aircraft conduct the first air raid against Baghdad in months. The Iraqi Air Force retaliates with a raid on Tehran.
- March 11–18 – A fully committed Iraqi Air Force flies 150 to 200 sorties a day as Iraq turns back an Iranian offensive out of the Hawizeh Marshes.
- March 19–23 – Iraqi strike aircraft and helicopters join artillery in employing mustard gas to halt an Iranian offensive in the Majnoon area.
- March 22 – In Operation Joshua, also known as Operation Sheba, six United States Air Force C-130 Hercules aircraft airlift around 500 Jews of the Beta Israel community who had fled a famine in Ethiopia and were living in refugee camps in Sudan. Taking the refugees aboard near Al Qadarif, Sudan, the aircraft fly them to Uvda Airbase in southern Israel.
- March 25 – The Emirates airline is founded in Dubai, UAE.
- March 29 – Ten service personnel are killed when two Canadian military planes collide at CFB Edmonton during a mass flyover.
- March 31
  - Kemayoran Airport in Jakarta, Indonesia, closes. The city's new main airport, Soekarno–Hatta International Airport, opens simultaneously.
  - Iraq claims to have hit about 30 ships in air attacks in the Persian Gulf since January 1, while Iran has hit seven over the same time period. Some estimates place the number of Iraqi attacks since March 1984 at 65 and Iranian attacks over the same period at 25.

=== April ===
- Frontier Horizon, a low-cost subsidiary of Frontier Airlines operating Boeing 727-100s, ceases operations.
- April 22 – Pan American World Airways sells off its Pacific routes to United Airlines for US$750 million.
- April 24 – LOT Polish Airlines resumes flights to New York City's John F. Kennedy International Airport.
- April 28 – Continental Airlines inaugurates its first scheduled service to Europe, flying from Houston Intercontinental Airport in Houston, Texas, to Gatwick Airport in London, England.
- April 29 – In a ceremony at Naval Air Station Oceana in Virginia Beach, the United States Navy accepts its first IAI Kfir fighters into service for use as MiG-23 (NATO reporting name "Flogger") simulators in air-to-air combat training. The Israeli-built Kfir is one of only two foreign-designed aircraft to see service in significant numbers in the United States Armed Forces during the Cold War, the other being the British-designed AV-8B Harrier II. Designated the F-21A in American service, the Kfirs will be operated by Fighter Squadron 43 (VF-43), a U.S. Navy "adversary" squadron.

=== May ===
- 1 May – United Airlines partners with Air Wisconsin, Aspen Airways, and WestAir as United Express, the brand name for a new regional airline that feeds United's hubs at (respectively) Chicago's O'Hare International Airport, Denver's Stapleton International Airport, and San Francisco's San Francisco International Airport.
- 3 May – A Tupolev Tu-134 operating as Aeroflot Flight SSSR-65856 with 79 people on board and a Soviet Air Forces Antonov An-26 with 15 people on board collide at 13,000 feet (4,000 m) near Zolochev in the Soviet Union's Ukrainian SSR, killing all 94 people on board the two planes. The cause of the collision is attributed to air traffic control errors. Among the dead are the Estonian table-tennis player Alari Lindmäe, two Soviet Army generals and Nikolai Dmitrijev, a Hero of Socialist Labor and one of the Soviet Union's most decorated civil airline pilots. Dmitrijev was the captain of the Tu-134.
- 13 May – During an armed standoff between members of the MOVE organization and officers of the Philadelphia Police Department at MOVE's house in the Cobbs Creek area of Philadelphia, Pennsylvania, a Pennsylvania State Police helicopter drops two 1-pound (0.45-kg) bombs made of water gel explosive on a fortified cubicle on the roof of the house. The bombs start a fire that destroys the MOVE house, killing 11 people in it, and then spreads, destroying approximately 65 houses before it is extinguished.
- 30 May – The Iraqi Air Force makes its first successful strike against the Iranian oil terminal at Kharg Island since June 1984. It will not attack Kharg Island again until mid-August.

=== June ===
- June 12 – The Government of Cuba creates the Civil Aviation Institute of Cuba (Spanish: Instituto de Aeronáutica Civil de Cuba) as Cuba's civil aviation authority.
- June 14 – Two Amal guerrilla gunmen hijack Trans World Airlines Flight 847, a Boeing 727-231 with 151 other people on board, during a flight from Athens, Greece to Rome, Italy. They divert the plane to Beirut International Airport, where 19 passengers are released in exchange for fuel. They then force the pilots to fly to Algiers, where 20 more passengers are released. They then return to Beirut, where they beat and murder United States Navy diver Robert Stethem, remove seven American passengers with what they believe are "Jewish-sounding" names to be held hostage in Beirut, and are joined by nearly a dozen more gunmen. They then force the plane to return to Algiers on June 15, release 65 more passengers and order the plane to fly back to Beirut on June 16. In Beirut they release Greek pop singer Demis Roussos in exchange for hijacking accomplice Ali Atwa on June 17, but remove 40 more people from the plane to be held hostage. The remaining 39 passengers and crew remain on the plane until June 30, when Israel agrees to free 700 Shiite prisoners. Flight attendant Uli Derickson plays a key role in maintaining calm aboard the airliner and negotiating with the gunmen.
- Mid-June – The Iraqi Air Force carries out its fiftieth raid on Tehran since the beginning of the Iran–Iraq War in September 1980.
- June 19 - A group of Islamic extremists blow up a section of the Frankfurt Airport. This is known as the

1985 Frankfurt Airport bombing.

- June 21 – A drunken Stein Arvid Huseby hijacks Braathens SAFE Flight 139, a Boeing 737-205 with 121 people on board, during its flight from Trondheim Airport in Værnes, Norway, to Oslo Airport in Fornebu, Norway, demanding that he be allowed on arrival at Fornebu to make a political statement and meet with Norwegian Prime Minister Kåre Willoch and Minister of Justice Mona Røkke due to his mistreatment in his incarceration. After the aircraft runs out of beer at Fornebu, Huseby trades his weapon for more beer and Norwegian police storm the plane and arrest him. It is the first aircraft hijacking in Norwegian history.
- June 23 – A bomb explodes at Narita International Airport in Japan amongst luggage intended for Air India Flight 301 to Bangkok, Thailand, killing two baggage handlers and injuring four. Fifty-five minutes later, Air India Flight 182, the Boeing 747 Emperor Kanishka, explodes off the Irish coast, killing all 329 on board; a terrorist bomb is suspected, but never confirmed.

=== July ===
- July 10 – Aeroflot Flight 7425, a Tupolev Tu-154B-2, crashes near Uchkuduk in the Soviet Union's Uzbek SSR after encountering a stall at 11,600 m (38,100 ft), resulting in a flat spin. All 200 people on board perish. It remains the deadliest air disaster in the history of the Soviet Union and Uzbekistan, as well as the deadliest incident involving a Tu-154.

=== August ===
August 1985 remains commercial aviation's deadliest month for passengers and crew (a distinction from the non-passenger fatalities of the September 11, 2001 attacks) in history.

- August 2
  - Delta Air Lines Flight 191, a Lockheed L-1011, encounters a microburst just short of the approach end of runway 17L at Dallas/Fort Worth International Airport. The aircraft strikes the ground, collides with a water storage tank, and explodes. The crash kills 137 people, including eight of the 12 crew and 128 of the 152 passengers, plus one person on the ground. Among the dead are Don Estridge, the inventor of the IBM PC, and his wife.
  - People Express Airlines announces the beginning of daily Boeing 747 service between Newark International Airport in New Jersey and Brussels, Belgium, at a price of $149.00, with fares discounted to $99.00 through September 30.
- August 12 – Japan Air Lines Flight 123, a Boeing 747 flying from Haneda Airport to Osaka, suffers a bulkhead explosion 12 minutes into its flight that was the result of improper repairs from a tailstrike accident seven years earlier. The resulting decompression blows off the vertical stabilizer and severs all of the aircraft's hydraulic lines. The pilots struggle to control the aircraft for 32 minutes until it crashes into Mount Takamagahara, killing 520 of 524 people on board. Among the dead are singer Kyu Sakamoto and Japanese banker Akihisa Yukawa, father of violinist Diana Yukawa. Farewell notes written from victims to their family and friends are found next to the bodies. It remains the worst single-aircraft air disaster and second-worst air disaster in history.
- August 14 – The Iraqi Air Force begins a series of air raids on the Iranian oil terminal at Kharg Island, seriously damaging a main offshore loading point there.
- August 21 – Sir Freddie Laker accepts GB£8 million in a settlement with British Airways. Laker had sued twelve airlines for conspiring to drive Laker Airways out of business.
- August 22 – The flight crew of British Airtours Flight 28M, a Boeing 737-236, aborts their takeoff at Manchester International Airport in Manchester, England, and find an engine on fire after taxiing to a stop. The fire spreads to the cabin, killing 55 people, 48 of them killed by toxic smoke; the other 82 people on board escape.
- August 25
  - A major Iraqi Air Force raid on Kharg Island apparently temporarily cuts the oil terminal's oil export capacity by about 30 percent.
  - Bar Harbor Airlines Flight 1808, a Beechcraft Model 99, crashes at Auburn, Maine, while on final approach to Auburn/Lewiston Municipal Airport, killing all eight people on board; among them is 13-year-old Samantha Smith, an American school girl who had become famous as a "Goodwill Ambassador" to the Soviet Union and who had been cast on the television show Lime Street.
- August 26 – Carl Icahn and associates purchase Trans World Airlines.

=== September ===
- September 1
  - The Iraqi Air Force makes its fourth large raid against the Iranian oil terminal at Kharg Island since mid-August. The Islamic Republic of Iran Air Force responds by increasing raids against commercial shipping in the Persian Gulf and threatening to attack ships visiting ports in the southern Persian Gulf; by early September, Iran and Iraq have carried out a combined 130 attacks on shipping since March 1985.
  - American race car driver Richie Panch dies along with the other three people aboard a Piper PA-28 Cherokee that flies into a squall line and heavy rain near Rion, South Carolina, and comes apart in mid-air.
- September 6 – Midwest Express Airlines Flight 105, a McDonnell Douglas DC-9-14, crashes just after takeoff from General Mitchell International Airport in Milwaukee, Wisconsin, after its right engine fails. All 31 people on board die.
- September 12 – The Iraqi Air Force launches its ninth major raid on the Iranian oil terminal at Kharg Island since mid-August.
- September 13 – Flying an F-15A Eagle about 200 miles (320 km) west of Vandenberg Air Force Base, California, United States Air Force Major William D. Pearson Jr. becomes the first pilot to destroy a space object. Flying at 38,000 feet (12,000 meters), he launches an ASM-135 antisatellite missile which ascends into space and destroys the P78-1 Solwind satellite at an altitude of 345 miles (555 km) over the Pacific Ocean. It is the third of five test launches of the ASM-135, and the first fully successful test of the entire missile system.
- September 16 – American aerobatic pilot, aerial cameraman, flight instructor, and educator Art Scholl dies during filming of the movie Top Gun when he puts his Pitts S-2 camera plane into a flat spin to film the spin but fails to pull out of it and crashes into the Pacific Ocean off Carlsbad, California.
- September 23 – Henson Airlines Flight 1517, a Beechcraft Model 99, goes off course while on approach to Shenandoah Valley Regional Airport and crashes into a 2,400-foot (732-meter) mountain near Grottoes, Virginia, killing all 14 people on board. American playwright and actor Larry Shue is among the dead.
- September 19 – A major Iraqi air raid on Kharg Island cuts its export production by as much as 50 percent.
- September 24 – Polar 3, a Dornier 228 operated as a survey and research airplane by the Alfred Wegener Institute for Polar and Marine Research, is shot down over Western Sahara south of Dakhla by Polisario Front guerrillas while en route to West Germany from Antarctica, killing its entire three-man crew. In December 1984 it had become one of the first two German planes ever to land at the South Pole.
- September 27 – Iraqi aircraft again damage loading terminals at Kharg Island.
- September 30 – The first Italian aircraft carrier, Giuseppe Garibaldi, is commissioned.

=== October ===
- October 1 – The Israeli Air Force conducts Operation Wooden Leg, a strike by eight F-15 Eagles flying from Tel Nof Airbase in Israel against the headquarters of the Palestine Liberation Organization (PLO) at Hammam al-Shatt, Tunisia, near Tunis, using precision-guided munitions. The strike completely destroys the headquarters and kills between 47 and 271 people, according to various reports, but misses PLO leader Yasser Arafat, who is absent at the time. The Israeli F-15s and an Israeli Boeing 707 aerial tanker supporting them all return safely to base. With a target 1,280 miles (2,060 km) from the operation's starting point, Wooden Leg is the most distant action the Israel Defense Forces have undertaken since Operation Entebbe in July 1976.
- October 3 – An Iraqi Air Force raid on the Iranian oil terminal at Kharg Island damages loading terminal facilities there.
- October 5 – People Express Airlines acquires Frontier Airlines. Instead of merging Frontier into People Express, it operates Frontier as an independent entity.
- October 10 – United States Navy F-14 Tomcat fighters of Fighter Squadrons 74 and 103 from the aircraft carrier USS Saratoga (CV-60) intercept an EgyptAir Boeing 737-200 flying from Egypt to Tunisia carrying members of the Palestinian Liberation Front who had hijacked the passenger ship MS Achille Lauro. They force it to land at Naval Air Station Sigonella on Sicily, where Italian authorities arrest the hijackers.
- October 17 – Tirirical Airport in São Luís, Brazil, is renamed Marechal Cunha Machado International Airport.

=== November ===
- The delivery of French AS-30 air-to-ground missiles to Iraq is confirmed, although they may have been in use by the Iraqi Air Force by mid-August.
- Mid-November – The total of Iraqi Air Force strikes against the Iranian oil terminal at Kharg Island reaches 37.
- November 18
  - General Dynamics purchases Cessna.
  - The first Space Shuttle, Enterprise, is flown to Washington Dulles International Airport atop a Boeing 747 Shuttle Carrier Aircraft and transferred from the National Aeronautics and Space Administration to the Smithsonian Institution for eventual museum display. Although lacking engines and a heat shield and never having flown in space, it has been used for shuttle portability, gliding, vibration, and launch pad tests and on publicity tours.
- November 23 – Omar Rezaq and two other members of the Abu Nidal Organization calling themselves the "Egypt Revolution" hijack EgyptAir Flight 648, a Boeing 737-200 – the same aircraft U.S. Navy fighters had intercepted in October – with 95 other people on board, during a flight from Athens, Greece, to Cairo, Egypt. An Egyptian security agent on board soon kills one of the hijackers before himself being wounded along with two flight attendants. The surviving hijackers force the plane to fly to Malta International Airport on Malta, where they kill two passengers and wound three others before Egyptian commandos storm the plane on November 24. The Egyptian raid kills 56 of the remaining 88 passengers as well as two crew members and one hijacker; Rezaq is arrested. In the end, only 38 passengers and crew survive the hijacking.
- November 25
  - South African Special Forces use a shoulder-launched surface-to-air missile to shoot down a Soviet Antonov An-12 carrying 21 people 43 km (27 mi) east of Menongue, Angola. All aboard the aircraft die.
  - A Rockwell Aero Commander 500S attempting to land at Des Moines, Iowa, with iced wings strikes trees and a power pole and crashes, killing all seven people on board. Three team members and two coaches of the Iowa State University women's cross country team are among the dead.

=== December ===
- December 12 – Arrow Air Flight 1285R, a chartered McDonnell Douglas DC-8-63CF, crashes shortly after takeoff from Gander, Newfoundland (now Newfoundland and Labrador), while taking 248 soldiers of the United States Army's 101st Airborne Division from West Germany to the United States for Christmas, killing all 256 people on board.
- December 19 – Yakutsk United Air Group Flight 101/435, an Antonov An-24 with 51 people on board making a domestic flight in the Soviet Union from Yakutsk to Chita, is hijacked by its co-pilot, Shamil Alimuradov, who is armed with a hatchet. He orders it to land in the People's Republic of China, and Soviet authorities give the airliner the radio frequency for Qiqihar Airport in Qiqihar, China. Alimuraov insisted that the An-24 land at Hailar, China, instead; the airliner runs out of fuel before it can reach Hailar and makes an emergency landing in a rice field, where Chinese authorities arrest Alimuradov. The passengers and other crew members will fly back to the Soviet Union on December 21 in a Tupolev Tu-134 they meet at Harbin, China, and the An-24 flies back to the Soviet Union in January 1986.
- December 27 – Using assault rifles and hand grenades, four men attack the ticket counter El Al and Trans World Airlines share at Leonardo da Vinci-Fiumicino Airport outside Rome, Italy, and a few minutes later three others attack the El Al ticket counter at Vienna International Airport in Vienna, Austria, killing a combined total of 19 people and wounding about 140 at the two airports. Police kill three of the Rome attackers and one of the attackers in Vienna, and the rest are arrested in both cities. The Abu Nidal Organization claims credit for the attacks.
- December 31
  - The Iraqi Air Force claims to have flown 20,011 sorties against Iran, to have made 77 destructive hits on the Iranian oil terminal at Kharg Island, and to have hit 124 "hostile maritime targets" in the Persian Gulf; Iraq will declare 1985 "The Year of the Pilot." Some reports indicate that Iran has carried out a total of 60 air raids against Kharg Island, and the Iraqi Air Force has attacked more than 200 ships in the Persian Gulf since beginning such attacks in May 1981, with over 150 of those attacks occurring since March 1985. Iraq claims to have bombed Tehran 30 times during 1985.
  - During 1985, Iraq has made 33 air attacks against shipping in the Persian Gulf, one using bombs and the remainder using air-to-surface missiles, while Iran has conducted 10 air attacks against Persian Gulf shipping. The total of Iraqi air attacks against Persian Gulf shipping since 1984 has reached 68, one using bombs and the rest air-to-surface missiles, while Iran's total since 1984 has reached 28.
  - American singer-songwriter and actor Ricky Nelson and six others die in the crash of a Douglas DC-3 near DeKalb, Texas.

== First flights ==
=== February ===
- February 3 – Atlas Alpha XH-1
- February 12 – Valmet L-90 Redigo prototype OH-VBB

=== March ===
- March 11 – ARV Super 2
- March 15 – Radab Windex

=== July ===
- July 9 – Prescott Pusher
- July 12 – Avid Amphibian
- July 25 – Politechnika Warszawska PW-2
- July 29 – Kawasaki T-4

=== August ===
- August 1 – PZL Krosno KR-03 Puchatek
- August 30 – Bell D-292 85-24371

=== September ===
- September 19 – Gulfstream IV
- September 19 – Centrair 201 Marianne

=== October ===
- October 6 – Ultimate Aircraft 10 Dash
- October 8 – Mudry CAP 230
- October 15 – Fairchild Republic T-46
- October 28 – NAL Asuka

=== December ===
- December 11 – Changhe Z-8
- December 28 – Fokker 50

== Entered service ==
=== June ===
- June 22 – Sukhoi Su-27 (NATO reporting name "Flanker") with the Soviet Air Forces

=== December ===
- December 3 – ATR-42 with Air Littoral

== Deadliest crash ==
1985 remains one of the deadliest years in aviation history. The deadliest of this year was Japan Air Lines Flight 123, a Boeing 747 which crashed in mountainous terrain in Gunma prefecture, Japan, on 12 August, killing 520 of the 524 people on board; the accident was the deadliest of the 1980s decade, and remains the deadliest single-aircraft accident in aviation history. The second deadliest of the 1980s took place only weeks before, when Air India Flight 182, also a Boeing 747, was destroyed by a terrorist bomb over the Atlantic Ocean west of Ireland on 23 June, killing all 329 people on board. August 1985 remains the worst single month for commercial aviation fatalities in history. Largely accounting for Flights 123, 182 and the 12 December crash of Arrow Air Flight 1285R (256 fatalities), a total of 2,010 people were killed in commercial aviation accidents in 1985; the second highest in commercial aviation history since 1942; only 1972 had more fatalities (2,373).
