= D8 =

D8, D.VIII, D VIII, D08 or D-8 may refer to:

== Entertainment ==
=== Television channels ===
- D8, the former name of C8 (French TV channel), a defunct French television channel
- D8TV, a Philippine television channel

=== Other ===
- d8 (magazine), a 1990s American magazine on role playing culture
- Dissipated Eight, a collegiate all-male a cappella group from Middlebury College
- d8, the eight-sided die used often in table-top role-playing games

== Transportation ==
- Aurora D8, an American concept airliner
- Bavarian D VIII, an 1888 German steam locomotive
- Caterpillar D8, a track-type tractor
- D-8 Armored Car, a Soviet vehicle
- Dewoitine D.8, a French aircraft
- Donkervoort D8, a Dutch sports car
- Dunne D.8, a British Dunne aircraft
- Fokker D.VIII, a 1918 German parasol-monoplane fighter aircraft
- HMAS Vendetta (D08), a 1954 Royal Australian Navy Daring class destroyer
- Pacific D-8, a glider
- Pfalz D.VIII, a German 1918 fighter aircraft
- Pro FE Straton D-8, a Czech motorglider
- ProFe D-8 Moby Dick, a Czech motorglider
- Spyker D8, a 2009 concept car
- GE Dash 8 Series, a locomotive series

== Other ==
- D8 motorway (Czech Republic), a road in the northern Czech Republic
- D8 road (Croatia), a section of the Adriatic highway
- Data8, a magnetic tape data storage format pioneered by Exabyte Corporation
- Digital8, a consumer digital videotape format developed by Sony
- Developing 8 Countries, a group of eight large, mostly Muslim nations
- District 8 (disambiguation)
- Dublin 8, a Dublin, Ireland postal district
- IATA code for Norwegian Air Sweden
- Previously IATA code for Norwegian Air International
- ATC code D08, Antiseptics and Disinfectants, a subgroup of the Anatomical Therapeutic Chemical Classification System
- d^{8} may refer to the d electron count of a transition metal complex
- D_{8} refers to the dihedral group of eight elements
- Delta-8-THC, a psychoactive cannabinoid
- Williams County School District 8

== See also ==
- 8D (disambiguation)
