= Junkers Profly =

German aircraft retailer and former manufacturer

- Company type: Privately held company
- Industry: Aerospace
- Products: kit aircraft, ultralight trikes
- Website: www.junkers-profly.de

Junkers Profly GmbH is a former German aircraft manufacturer based in Kulmbach. The company specialized in the design and manufacture of ultralight trikes and fixed wing aircraft. The company was formerly located in Kodnitz.

Junkers Profly still exists in 2014, but it does not currently produce any of its own designs. Instead it markets the ProFe Banjo family of aircraft for ProFe as well as provides flight training, accessories and aircraft parts.

== Aircraft ==
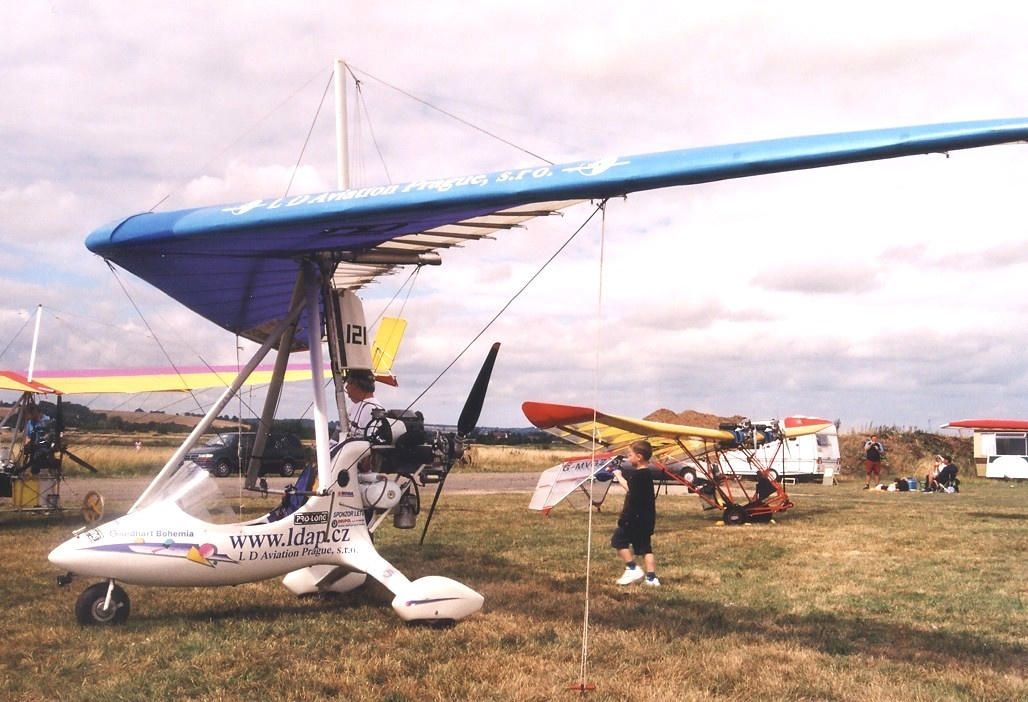
Junkers Profly Junkers Trike

Summary of aircraft built by Junkers Profly
Model name	First flight	Number built	Type
Junkers Profly Ultima	1993		two seat aerobatic homebuilt aircraft
Junkers Profly Junkers Trike			one or two seat ultralight trike
