= Super Standard =

Super Standard may refer to:

- Prue Super Standard, an American glider
- Super Standard (album), a 2004 album by Kenny Barron, Jay Leonhart and Al Foster
