= Politechnika Warszawska PW-4 Pelikan =

PW-4 Pelikan
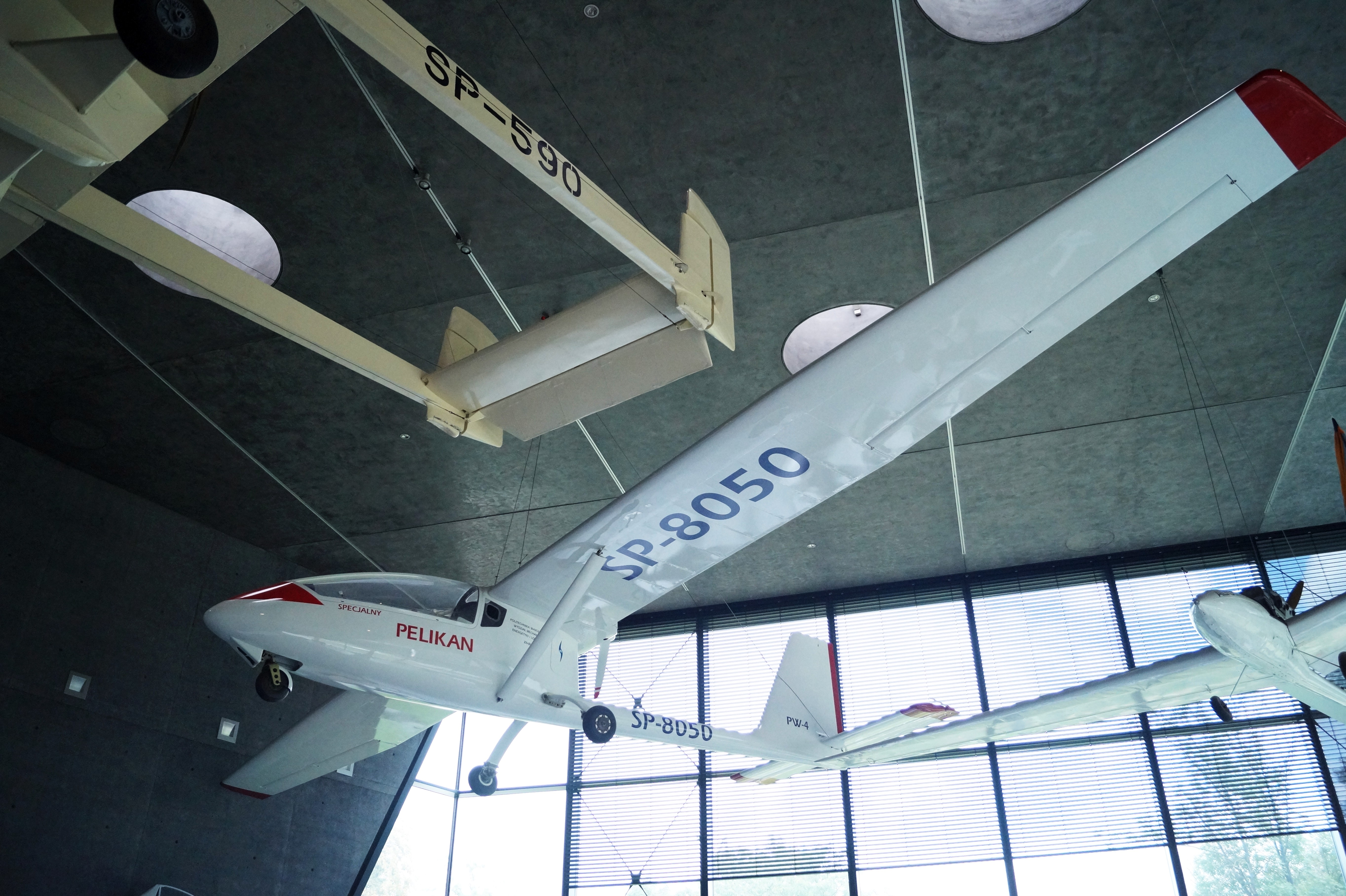
- PW-4 Pelikan in the Polish Aviation Museum.

General information
- Type: two seat motor-glider
- National origin: Poland
- Manufacturer: Politechnika Warszawska
- Number built: 1

History
- First flight: 23 December 1990

The Politechnika Warszawska PW-4 Pelikan was a motor-glider variant of the two seat Polish PW-3 Bakcyl glider. Only one flew.

== Design and development ==
The Pelikan's structure and general layout was based on that of the PW-3 Bakcyl trainer glider. Both had fibreglass-epoxy structures, with a high wing, a tailboom with a conventional tail and a forward fuselage with two seats in tandem under a long canopy. Their differences stemmed from the pusher engine and its propeller, together with new landing gear to enable self-powered take-offs.

Both aircraft had two-part wings built around a single spar with a glassfibre-covered D-box ahead of it and fabric covering behind. Unlike the Bakcyl, no forward sweep was necessary because the weight of the engine moved the centre of gravity rearwards to the passenger's seat, allowing the Pelikan to be flown with that seat occupied or empty, so the central section of the wing was rectangular in plan and the long tips straight-tapered on both leading and trailing edges. As on the Bakcyl, ailerons were on the outer sections and spoilers inboard, just behind the spars. The wings were braced from the lower fuselage with a single, faired strut to the spar on each side.

Forward of the wing the two aircraft were similar but the pod of the Pelikan ended ahead of the trailing edge of the wing. Its flat four, air-cooled, 60 kW (80 hp) Limbach L2000 engine was mounted on the wing and drove a pusher propeller, requiring the slender, rounded tailboom to be lowered from the wing, on the Bakcyl, to the bottom of the pod. The tail was similar to that of the Bakcyl, with a tall, broad fin and smaller, fabric covered rudder, together trapezoidal in profile, and a smaller, low set, fin-mounted, rectangular plan horizontal tail at the extreme end of the tailboom, its one-piece elevator aft of the rudder.

The Pelikan had fixed tricycle gear with mainwheels, equipped with brakes, on arched, cantilever, fibreglass-epoxy/spring legs from the lower fuselage (though one photograph shows an additional drag strut) and a smaller, steerable nosewheel.

Two airframes were built but only one flew, with the other used for stress-testing. The first flight was on 23 December 1990.

== Operational history ==
A very long series of testing followed, only concluding on 29 July 1995. It was decided that the Pelikan would not sell well, so no more were built. The prototype was operated by the Institute of Aeronautics and Applied Mechanics of Warsaw University of Technology. It displayed at the 16th Meeting of Amateur Aviation Structures in Oleśnica in June 1997 and remained active until seriously damaged in an accident on 11 November 2012. In that period it logged 800 hours of flight.

It never flew again but was restored to display condition by 2015 and can be seen in the Polish Aviation Museum, Kraków.

== Specifications ==
Data from Samolotypolskie except where noted

General characteristics

- Crew: one
- Capacity: one passenger
- Length: 8.00 m (26 ft 3 in)
- Wingspan: 16.20 m (53 ft 2 in)
- Height: 2.4 m (7 ft 10 in)
- Wing area: 18.80 m^{2} (202.4 sq ft)
- Aspect ratio: 14.0
- Airfoil: TsAGI R-III
- Empty weight: 525 kg (1,157 lb)
- Gross weight: 720 kg (1,587 lb)
- Fuel capacity: 40 L (8.8 imp gal; 11 US gal)
- Powerplant: 1 × Limbach L2000EC1 flat four, aircooled, 60 kW (80 hp)
- Propellers: 2-bladed Hoffmann V62R/D160BT-5

Performance

- Maximum speed: 150 km/h (93 mph, 81 kn)
- Cruise speed: 89 km/h (55 mph, 48 kn)
- Stall speed: 65 km/h (40 mph, 35 kn)
- Range: 450 km (280 mi, 240 nmi)
- Maximum glide ratio: 19.4 at 89 km/h (55 mph; 48 kn)
- Rate of sink: 1.25 m/s (246 ft/min) minimum, at 82 km/h (51 mph; 44 kn)
