= Junkers Profly Junkers Trike =

German ultralight trike

Junkers Trike
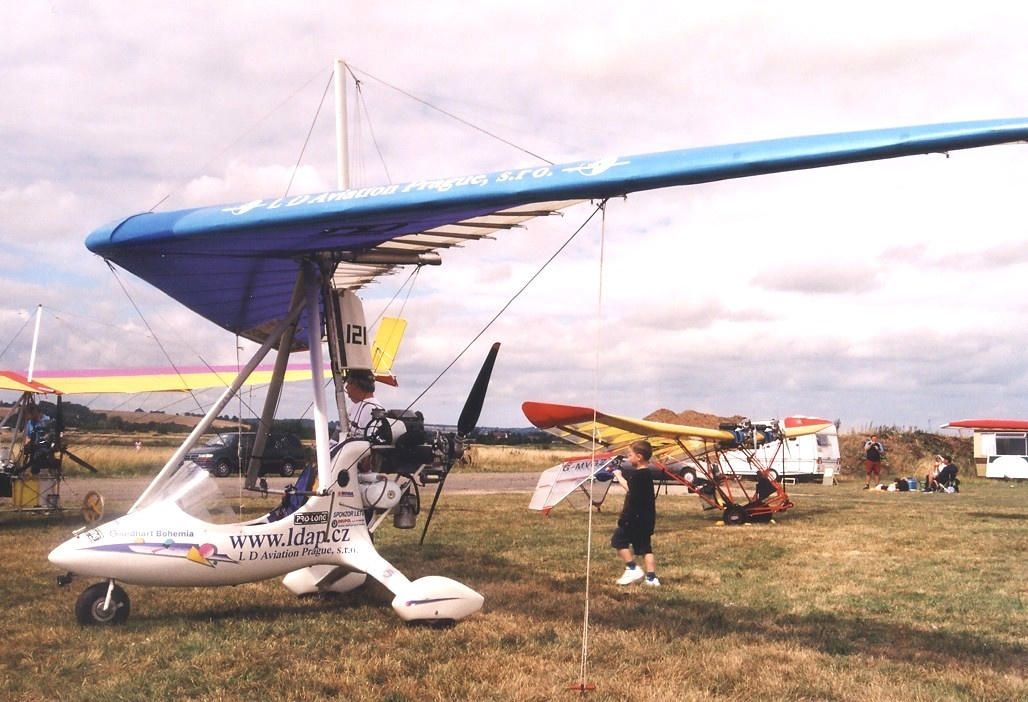
- Early model Junkers Trike single seater

General information
- Type: Ultralight trike
- National origin: Germany
- Manufacturer: Junkers Profly
- Status: Production completed

The Junkers Profly Junkers Trike is a German ultralight trike, designed by Junkers Profly of Kulmbach and manufactured under contract in the Czech Republic. When it was available the aircraft was supplied complete and ready-to-fly.

The aircraft is no longer listed on the Junkers Profly website and production appears to have been completed.

== Design and development ==
The Junkers Trike was originally designed as a single seater or "tight" two-seater, but later stretched to provide comfortable accommodation for two occupants.

The aircraft was designed to comply with the Fédération Aéronautique Internationale microlight category, including the category's maximum gross weight of 450 kg (992 lb). The aircraft has a maximum gross weight of 450 kg (992 lb). It features a cable-braced hang glider-style high-wing, weight-shift controls, a single-seat or two-seats-in-tandem open cockpit with an aerodynamically streamlined cockpit fairing, tricycle landing gear with wheel pants and a single engine in pusher configuration.

The aircraft fuselage is made from fibre glass, with its single or double surface wing covered in Dacron sailcloth. The typical wing used is of 9.6 m (31.5 ft) span, is supported by a single tube-type kingpost and uses an "A" frame weight-shift control bar. The standard powerplant factory supplied was the twin cylinder, liquid-cooled, two-stroke, dual-ignition 64 hp (48 kW) Rotax 582 engine.

With the Rotax 582 the aircraft has an empty weight of 186 kg (410 lb) and a gross weight of 450 kg (992 lb), giving a useful load of 264 kg (582 lb). With full fuel of 43 litres (9.5 imp gal; 11 US gal) the payload is 233 kg (514 lb).

A number of different wings can be fitted to the basic carriage, including those made by Bautek and La Mouette. The aircraft was certified in Germany to DULV standards.

== Specifications (Junkers Trike) ==
Data from Bayerl

General characteristics

- Crew: one
- Capacity: one passenger
- Wingspan: 9.6 m (31 ft 6 in)
- Wing area: 12.8 m^{2} (138 sq ft)
- Empty weight: 186 kg (410 lb)
- Gross weight: 450 kg (992 lb)
- Fuel capacity: 43 litres (9.5 imp gal; 11 US gal)
- Powerplant: 1 × Rotax 582 twin cylinder, liquid-cooled, two stroke aircraft engine, 48 kW (64 hp)
- Propellers: 4-bladed composite

Performance

- Wing loading: 35.2 kg/m^{2} (7.2 lb/sq ft)
