= 8D =

8D or 8-D may refer to:

- Eight-dimensional space
- "Grinning with glasses", an emoticon in which the "8" represents open eyes and the "D" an open mouth, see List of emoticons
- Eight disciplines problem solving

== Transport ==
- 8D Technologies, a Canadian company that develops bicycle-sharing systems
- GCR Class 8D, a class of British 4-4-2 steam locomotive
- Secondary State Highway 8D (Washington), former name of Washington State Route 141
- Typ 8D, first-generation Audi A4

=== IATA airline codes ===
- Astair
- Expo Aviation
- Servant Air

== See also ==
- D8 (disambiguation)
