= Junkers Profly Ultima =

German homebuilt aircraft

Ultima

General information
- Type: Homebuilt aircraft
- National origin: Germany
- Manufacturer: Junkers Profly
- Designer: Andre Konig
- Status: Production completed

History
- Introduction date: 1993

The Junkers Profly Ultima is a German aerobatic homebuilt aircraft that was designed by Andre Konig and produced by Junkers Profly of Kodnitz, introduced in 1993. When it was available the aircraft was supplied as a kit for amateur construction.

By January 2014 the aircraft was no longer offered by the company.

== Design and development ==
The Ultima features a cantilever low-wing, a two-seats-in-side-by-side configuration enclosed cockpit under a bubble canopy, fixed tricycle landing gear with wheel pants and a single engine in tractor configuration.

The aircraft's 8.2 m (26.9 ft) span wing mounts flaps and has a wing area of 10.5 m^{2} (113 sq ft). The cabin width is 101 cm (40 in). The acceptable power range is 50 to 80 hp (37 to 60 kW) and the standard engine used is the 80 hp (60 kW) Rotax 912UL four stroke powerplant. For its aerobatic role the Ultima is stressed to +6 and -4 g.

The Ultima has a typical empty weight of 260 kg (570 lb) and a gross weight of 450 kg (990 lb), giving a useful load of 190 lb (86 kg). With full fuel of 120 litres (26 imp gal; 32 US gal) the payload for pilot, passenger and baggage is just 103 kg (227 lb).

The manufacturer estimated the construction time from the supplied kit as 400 hours.

== Specifications (Ultima) ==
Data from AeroCrafter

General characteristics

- Crew: one
- Capacity: one passenger
- Length: 6.00 m (19.69 ft)
- Wingspan: 8.20 m (26.90 ft)
- Wing area: 10.50 m^{2} (113.0 sq ft)
- Empty weight: 260 kg (573 lb)
- Gross weight: 450 kg (992 lb)
- Fuel capacity: 120 litres (26 imp gal; 32 US gal)
- Powerplant: 1 × Rotax 912UL four cylinder, air and liquied-cooled, four stroke aircraft engine, 60 kW (80 hp)
- Propellers: 2-bladed fixed pitch

Performance

- Maximum speed: 261 km/h (162 mph, 141 kn)
- Cruise speed: 210 km/h (130 mph, 110 kn)
- Stall speed: 64 km/h (40 mph, 35 kn) flaps down
- Range: 1,100 km (700 mi, 610 nmi)
- Service ceiling: 5,000 m (16,400 ft)
- g limits: +6/-4
- Wing loading: 43 kg/m^{2} (8.8 lb/sq ft)

== See also ==
- List of aerobatic aircraft
