= Peterson J-4 Javelin =

American glider

J-4 Javelin

General information
- Type: Glider
- National origin: United States
- Manufacturer: Peterson Sailplane Corporation
- Designer: Max A. Peterson
- Status: No longer in production
- Number built: 8

History
- Introduction date: 1973
- First flight: 1969

The Peterson J-4 Javelin is an American, single seat, mid-wing glider that was designed by Max A. Peterson in the late 1960s and produced by the Peterson Sailplane Corporation in small numbers. The glider was type certified and put into production in 1973.

== Design and development ==
Peterson designed the J-4 based on lessons he learned with his earlier Peterson Medena design. The J-4 is a single seater, but can carry a child in the small seating area behind the pilot.

The J-4's fuselage is made from steel tube with the lower part covered in a fiberglass shell and the upper part sheet aluminium. The wing is built around a chem-milled tubular spar and is assembled predominantly with pop rivets. The wing has no ailerons and instead roll control is via upper surface spoilerons that eliminate virtually all adverse yaw. Spoilers are also provided for glide-path control. The landing gear is a monowheel.

First flown in 1969, the J-4 was Federal Aviation Administration type certified on 6 February 1973. A pilot production run of eight examples was completed, but production was not continued. Poly Industries of Ontario, California produced aircraft under licensing agreement from Peterson Sailplane Corporation, who held the type certificate.

== Operational history ==
In 1983, six of the original eight built were reportedly still flying and there were still six registered in April 2011.

== Specifications (variant specified) ==
Data from Sailplane Directory, Soaring and FAA type certificate

General characteristics

- Crew: one
- Wingspan: 49 ft 0 in (14.94 m)
- Wing area: 126 sq ft (11.7 m^{2})
- Aspect ratio: 20.1:1
- Airfoil: NACA 64(3)-618
- Empty weight: 512 lb (232 kg)
- Gross weight: 804 lb (365 kg)

Performance

- Never exceed speed: 120 mph (190 km/h, 100 kn)
- Maximum glide ratio: 30:1 at 65 mph (105 km/h)
- Rate of sink: 126 ft/min (0.64 m/s)

== See also ==
- List of gliders
