= Prue UHP-1 =

Glider designed by Irving Prue

UHP-1

General information
- Type: Glider
- National origin: United States
- Designer: Irving Prue
- Number built: Two

History
- Manufactured: 1966 and 1974
- Introduction date: 1967
- First flight: 1967

The Prue UHP-1 is an American high-wing, single-seat, T-tailed FAI Open Class glider that was designed by Irving Prue.

== Design and development ==
The prototype Prue UHP-1 was constructed by Prue, completed in 1966 and first flown in 1967.

The prototype features a NACA 63-618, with an all-metal wing with doped aircraft fabric covering aft of the wing spar. This arrangement did not hold the correct airfoil shape at high speeds according to tests conducted. The fuselage is also of all-metal construction and features a fixed monowheel landing gear, coupled with a skid, a conventional T-tail and a drag chute. Aside from the drag chute, glide path control is via spoilers.

Two Prue UHP-1s were built, the second incorporating many changes to the design. Both aircraft were registered as Experimental - Amateur-builts.

== Operational history ==
The second UHP-1 built was reported by the owner as having good handling characteristics and a lower minimum sink speed than a Schleicher ASW 17.

As of June 2011 both aircraft are still registered with the Federal Aviation Administration.

== Variants ==
UHP-1
Initial prototype with fixed landing gear.
UHP-1 Modified
The second aircraft, built in 1974, which incorporates an all-metal wing to address the fabric issues on the first aircraft. It also has retractable monowheel landing gear, the nose and canopy from a Schempp-Hirth Open Cirrus, flaps, water ballast and a fully trimmable tailplane. The aircraft is officially registered with the FAA as a UHP-1 MODIFIED and has an empty weight that is more than 100 lb (45 kg) heavier than the prototype.

== Specifications (UHP-1 Modified) ==
Data from Sailplane Directory and Soaring

General characteristics

- Crew: one
- Wingspan: 57 ft 0 in (17.37 m)
- Wing area: 114 sq ft (10.6 m^{2})
- Aspect ratio: 28.5:1
- Airfoil: NACA 63-618
- Empty weight: 505 lb (229 kg)
- Gross weight: 889 lb (403 kg)

Performance

- Maximum glide ratio: 40 at 69 mph (111 km/h)
- Rate of sink: 96 ft/min (0.49 m/s) at 49 mph (79 km/h)
- Wing loading: 7.8 lb/sq ft (38 kg/m^{2})

== See also ==
Aircraft of comparable role, configuration, and era

- Schempp-Hirth Cirrus

Related lists

- List of gliders
