= ProFe D-10 Tukan =

Czech glider

D-10 Tukan

General information
- Type: Motor glider
- National origin: Czech Republic
- Manufacturer: ProFe
- Status: Production completed
- Number built: 4 (1998)

The ProFe D-10 Tukan (English: Toucan) is a Czech high-wing, strut-braced, T-tailed, two-seat motor glider that was designed and produced by ProFe and made available in kit form for amateur construction.

== Design and development ==
The D-10 was designed as a self-launching sailplane. The engine is a Rotax 447 of 40 hp (30 kW), mounted in tractor configuration on a retractable arm behind the cockpit. The engine can be retracted in 15 seconds.

The D-10 is predominantly constructed from fibreglass and wood. The cabin is enclosed under a bubble canopy. The conventional landing gear uses two side-by-side, non-retractable mainwheels under the cockpit floor set closely together. The 14.7 m (48.23 ft) span wing is supported by a single lift strut and jury struts on each side and employs a Wortmann FX 63-137 airfoil.

== Specifications (D-10 Tukan) ==
Data from ProFe

General characteristics

- Crew: one
- Capacity: one passenger
- Length: 7.30 m (23.95 ft)
- Wingspan: 14.7 m (48 ft 3 in)
- Height: 2.4 m (7 ft 10 in)
- Wing area: 14.7 m^{2} (158 sq ft)
- Aspect ratio: 14.7
- Airfoil: Wortmann FX 63-137
- Empty weight: 220 kg (485 lb)
- Gross weight: 420 kg (926 lb)
- Fuel capacity: 34 litres (9.0 US gal)
- Powerplant: 1 × Rotax 447 twin-cylinder, two stroke aircraft engine, 29.5 kW (39.6 hp)
- Propellers: 2-bladed wooden

Performance

- Maximum speed: 115 km/h (71 mph, 62 kn) in horizontal flight
- Stall speed: 58 km/h (36 mph, 31 kn)
- Never exceed speed: 125 km/h (78 mph, 67 kn) VNE
- g limits: +4/-2 G
- Rate of climb: 2.0 m/s (400 ft/min)
- Rate of sink: 0.68 m/s (134 ft/min)
- Lift-to-drag: 22 (at 85 km/h (46 kn))
- Wing loading: 28.6 kg/m^{2} (5.9 lb/sq ft)

== See also ==
- List of gliders
