= Politechnika Warszawska PW-3 Bakcyl =

PW-3 Bakcyl

General information
- Type: primary glider
- National origin: Poland
- Manufacturer: Politechnika Warszawska
- Designer: dr. Eng. Roman Świtkiewicz
- Number built: 1

History
- First flight: 14 August 1988
- Developed from: Politechnika Warszawska PW-2 Gapa

The Politechnika Warszawska PW-3 Bakcyl (Microbe) is a Polish primary glider developed from the PW-2 Gapa.

== Design and development ==
The Bakcyl is a two seat development of the single seat PW-2 Gapa primary trainer from 1985. The main improvements were the addition of Frise ailerons and an enclosed cabin for pupil and instructor. The wingspan was increased by 33% and, overall, the changes doubled the empty weight. Despite this and the two occupants, bungee launches remained possible and, with the increased weight, the best glide angle improved by 25%.

Over most of the span the two-part wings of the Bakcyl have constant chord and forward sweep but their long tips are trapezoidal, with sweep on their leading edges. Forward sweep has often been employed on two seat gliders to position the rear seat over the centre of gravity, so the aircraft can be flown solo from the front seat without re-trimming; an early example is the Schleicher Ka 2 Rhönschwalbe. Largely constructed of glassfibre, it is built around a single spar with a glassfibre-covered D-box ahead of it and is fabric covered behind the spar. The wings are braced to the fuselage with a single, broad-chord strut on each side. Originally these struts could pivot through 90° to act as airbrakes, as on the PW-2, but they were later replaced with upper surface spoilers, inboard of the ailerons and positioned immediately behind the spars.

The glass-epoxy composite fuselage is in two parts, a forward cabin which ends with a fairing under the wing trailing edge and a slender, square section tailboom just below the wing. Occupants sit in tandem, the student forward and their instructor under the leading edge. A long, one-piece canopy reaches back to the rear seat which has a short, fixed glazed extension under the wing. The Bakcyl lands on a fixed, fully exposed monowheel under the forward fuselage, aft of mid-chord, which has a shock absorber and a brake. A smaller nosewheel and plywood skid complete the landing gear.

The Bakcyl's tail is conventional and similar to that of the PW-2, with a rectangular plan, canvas-covered tailplane mounted on top of the end of the tailboom and carrying a one-piece, narrow-chord elevator. Its fin and rudder, well forward of the elevator, are trapezoidal.

== Operational history ==
The only Bakcyl first flew on 14 August 1988, followed by a period of flight testing. When this concluded the Bakcyl was used by the Bieszczadzki Aeroclub in Łódź and may still be active.

== Specifications ==
Data from Jane's All the World's aircraft 1990-91

General characteristics

- Crew: two, instructor and pupil
- Length: 7.25 m (23 ft 9 in)
- Wingspan: 14.65 m (48 ft 1 in)
- Height: 2.50 m (8 ft 2 in)
- Wing area: 17.50 m^{2} (188.4 sq ft)
- Aspect ratio: 12.0
- Airfoil: CAGI R-III
- Empty weight: 220 kg (485 lb)
- Max takeoff weight: 420 kg (926 lb)

Performance

- Maximum speed: 180 km/h (110 mph, 97 kn) i smooth air
- Stall speed: 55 km/h (34 mph, 30 kn)
- g limits: +5.6/-2.65
- Maximum glide ratio: 20 at 90 km/h (56 mph; 49 kn)
- Rate of sink: 1.1 m/s (220 ft/min) minimum
