= CAAC Flight 5109 =

1985 aviation incident in China

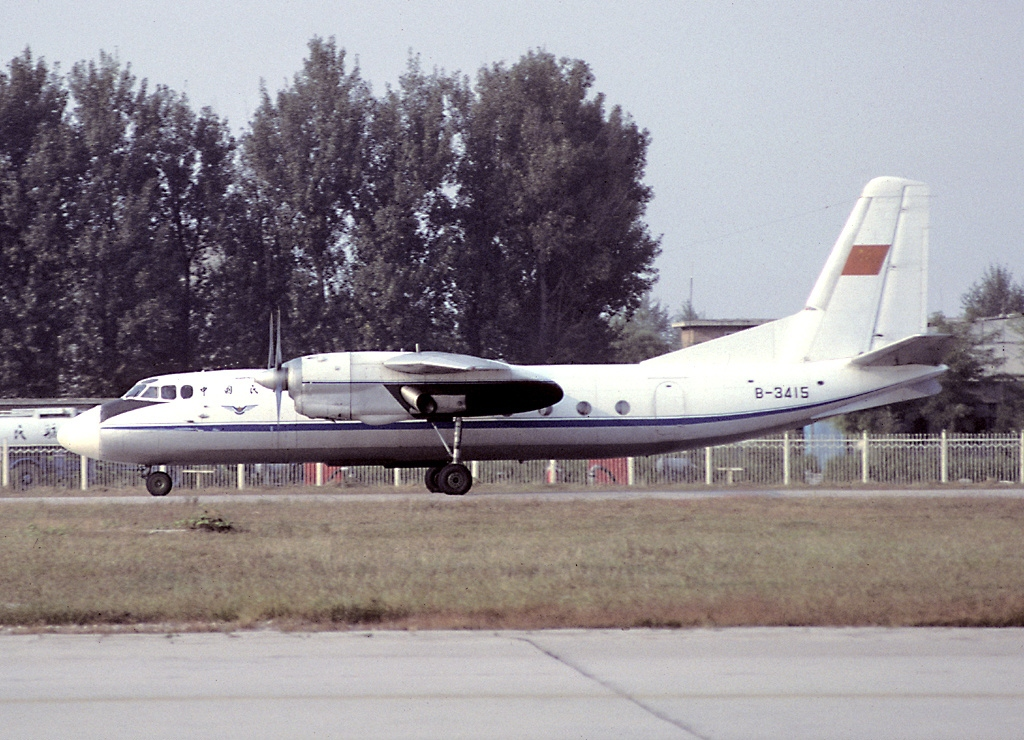
- An aircraft similar to the one involved in the crash

Accident
- Date: 18 January 1985
- Summary: Pilot error, stall
- Site: Jinan, China

Aircraft
- Aircraft type: An-24B
- Operator: Civil Aviation Administration of China Fifth Flight Regiment (under Civil Aviation Administration of China Shanghai Bureau)
- Registration: B-434
- Flight origin: Shanghai Hongqiao International Airport, Shanghai, China
- Stopover: Nanjing Dajiaochang Airport, Nanjing, China
- Last stopover: Jinan Zhangzhuang Airport, Jinan, China
- Destination: Beijing Capital International Airport, Beijing, China
- Occupants: 41
- Passengers: 34
- Crew: 7
- Fatalities: 38
- Injuries: 3
- Survivors: 3

CAAC Flight 5109 was a domestic passenger flight from Shanghai to Beijing with stops in Nanjing and Jinan. On 18 January 1985 at 9:10 p.m. local time, the Antonov An-24 operating this flight crashed when it tried to land at Jinan Zhangzhuang Airport. The plane had taken off from Shanghai at 3:30 p.m. and had a layover in Nanjing. It had been scheduled to depart from Nanjing and reach Jinan at 6:50 p.m. but was delayed owing to inclement weather in Jinan. Prior to the crash, the aircraft had been in a 90-minute holding pattern over the field.

There were 41 passengers and crew members of whom 38 died and three had injuries. Two of the passengers who died were American citizens, the businessmen Peter Barkanic and Donald Fox. There were also four Hong Kong residents on the plane who died: Choi Ki-wah; Tsang Wai-wing; Chan Hong-chung; and Michael Shane, a British citizen. Choi and Shane had been doing business travel for their employer Brown, Boveri & Cie, an electrical engineering company. The remaining occupants of the aircraft were Chinese citizens. The three injured passengers were taken to a Jinan Air Force hospital. One source reported that the three who lived through the accident were part of a group of five ejected from the aircraft, while another said that the three (two Chinese passengers and a 17-year-old female flight attendant) had leapt from the plane. Everyone still in the aircraft was killed by the ensuing fire.

Nearly a day passed before Chinese authorities publicly reported the accident. According to The Globe and Mail, the accident received greater coverage in domestic media compared to similar incidents. The newspaper said that evening news television programs for the first time aired accident scene footage. Chen Xiaomo, a high-ranking CAAC representative, attributed the accident to "poor weather". On 24 January, Li Peng, the Vice Premier of China, received a briefing about the crash investigation, surveyed the accident scene, and met with the survivors. He told the CAAC to "summarize lessons and carry out the thorough reform of civil aviation work".

A payout of roughly $1,700 (equivalent to $5,089 in 2025) went to relatives of the deceased Chinese nationals. Families of the Hong Kong residents and foreign citizens who died received a payout of $20,000 (equivalent to $59,870 in 2025).
