= Pacific D-8 =

American glider

D-8

General information
- Type: Glider
- National origin: United States
- Manufacturer: Pacific Aircraft Company
- Designer: Ken Coward
- Status: No longer available
- Number built: 5

History
- Introduction date: 1963
- First flight: May 1964

The Pacific D-8 is an American, single-seat, high-wing glider, that was designed by Ken Coward and made available as plans for amateur construction.

== Design and development ==
The D-8 was conceived by Coward as an easy-to-build and inexpensive all-aluminium glider with good performance, that could be flown with or without a canopy. Later flight testing of a completed D-8 showed that the hoped-for performance was not achieved as the glide ratio was measured at just 17:1 with no canopy fitted.

Coward designed the D-8 and sold plans, but never built a prototype. The first D-8 was built by Klaus Hill and Bruno Hauffe who purchased plans in 1963. Virl Kimber made the first flight of the aircraft in May 1964. Early aircraft built showed that the ailerons and rudder were too small and that the wing was set at too high an angle of incidence for safety and most were subsequently modified. The plans were changed to incorporate larger ailerons. The all-metal wing is a one piece unit 32 ft (9.8 m) in span and 125 lb (57 kg) in weight, that proved a challenge to design a trailer to carry.

At least five were completed, including one built by members of the Lockhaven Glider Club in Pennsylvania. That same aircraft was used for extensive flight testing by a subsequent owner to accurately measure its performance. One was built as a powered motor glider.

== Specifications (D-8) ==
Data from Sailplane Directory and Soaring

General characteristics

- Crew: one
- Wingspan: 31 ft 8 in (9.65 m)
- Wing area: 100 sq ft (9.3 m^{2})
- Airfoil: Modified NASA 4418
- Empty weight: 253 lb (115 kg)
- Gross weight: 460 lb (209 kg)

Performance

- Maximum glide ratio: 17:1 (measured, no canopy)
- Rate of sink: 252 ft/min (1.28 m/s) (measured, no canopy)
- Wing loading: 4.6 lb/sq ft (22 kg/m^{2})

== See also ==
- List of gliders

Aircraft of comparable role, configuration, and era

- Briegleb BG-12
