= Prue Standard =

American glider

Standard
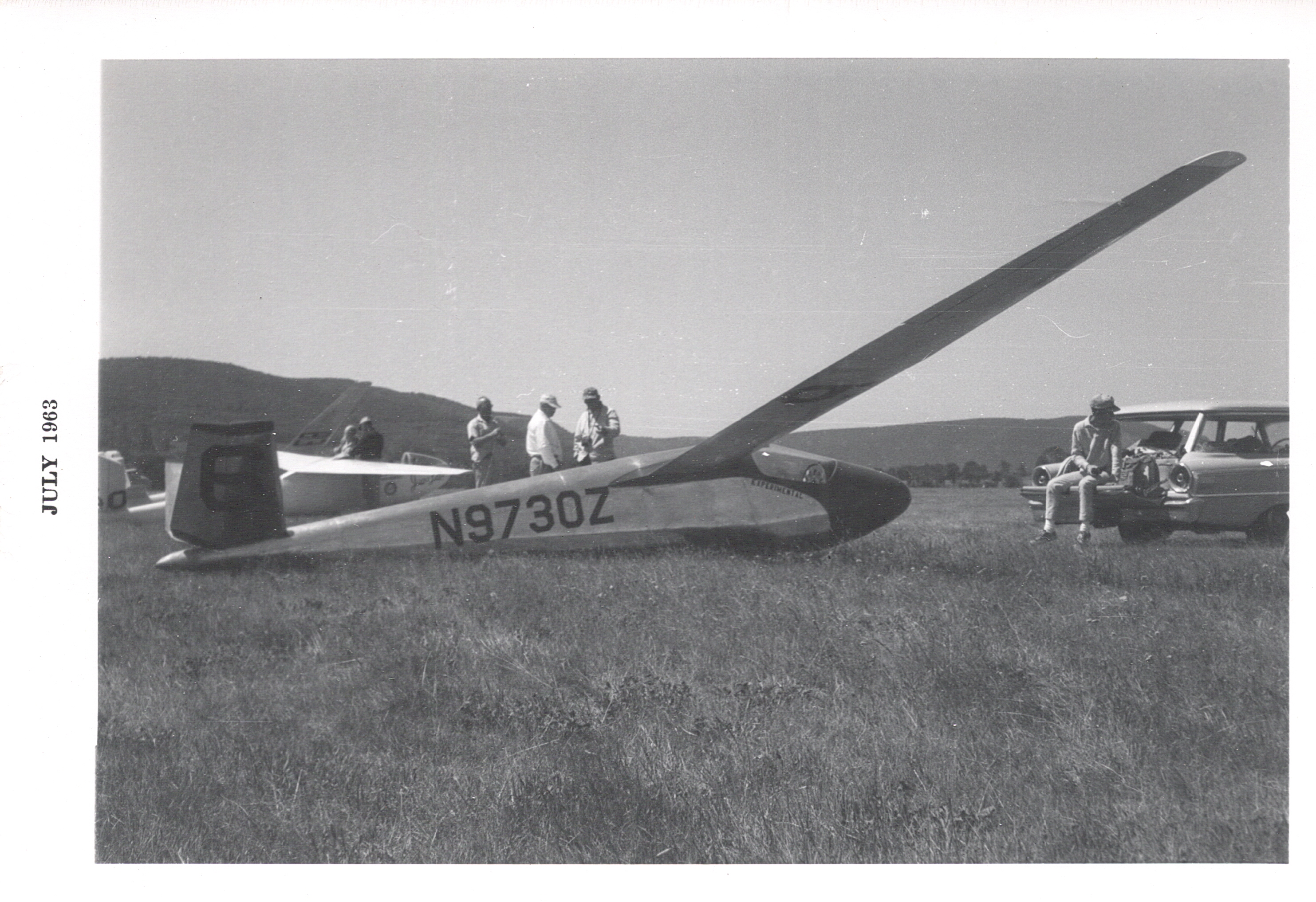
- Paul Bikle's Prue Standard

General information
- Type: Glider
- National origin: United States
- Designer: Irving Prue
- Status: No longer in production
- Number built: Three

History
- Introduction date: 1961
- Variant: Prue Super Standard

The Prue Standard is an American high-wing, single-seat, V-tailed, FAI Standard Class glider that was designed by Irving Prue.

== Design and development ==
The Prue Standard was designed in response to the Fédération Aéronautique Internationale introduction of rules creating the Standard Class. The prototype was completed in 1961.

The Standard is an all-metal aircraft with a fixed monowheel landing gear. The prototype originally had wings with a 15 m (49.2 ft) span and dive brakes on the lower wing surface. The wing employs a NACA 63-618 laminar flow airfoil, an I-beam spar and has a semi-tapered planform.

Only three examples were completed, all were different and all have since been modified further. The type was further refined into a new design in 1962, the Prue Super Standard.

== Operational history ==
Paul Bikle flew the second Standard completed to a world record distance of 557 mi (896 km) in 1963. That flight was the longest ever made by a sailplane up to that date.

The prototype was flown 14,000 mi (22,531 km) cross country and had accumulated more than 850 hours by 1974.

All aircraft were registered as Experimental Amateur-builts. Only one Prue Standard still exists.

== Variants ==
Standard prototype
The prototype, registered N9726Z, later had its wings extended to 54 ft (16.5 m), giving it a wing area of 130 sq ft (12 m^{2}) and an aspect ratio of 23:1. The V-tail was also made longer. The modifications also raised the empty weight to 520 lb (236 kg). The prototype was converted to a Super Standard and has been de-registered.
Standard #2
This aircraft had a longer fuselage and a deeper cockpit section. It also featured top and bottom dive brakes. It later had its wings extended. It was registered as N9730Z, but is no longer on the Federal Aviation Administration registry.
Standard #3
This aircraft was built by Bob Gravance of Palmdale, California. It features dive brakes on the bottom of the wing only, but externally mounted. Otherwise the fuselage is the same as #2. This aircraft had a new set of longer wings built for it, featuring a straight taper. The aircraft was reportedly a total loss after a tied-down accident at El Mirage, California. Registered as N2728Z the aircraft is the sole Standard still on the FAA registry.

== Specifications (Standard - original configuration) ==
Data from Soaring

General characteristics

- Crew: one
- Wingspan: 49 ft 3 in (15 m)
- Wing area: 121.5 sq ft (11.29 m^{2})
- Aspect ratio: 19.96:1
- Airfoil: NACA 63-618
- Empty weight: 446 lb (202 kg)
- Gross weight: 725 lb (329 kg)

Performance

- Maximum glide ratio: 35 at 56 mph (90 km/h)
- Rate of sink: 129 ft/min (0.66 m/s) at 44 mph (71 km/h)
- Wing loading: 6.0 lb/sq ft (29 kg/m^{2})

== See also ==
Related lists

- List of gliders
