= Polikarpov BDP-2 =

1940s Soviet military transport glider

BDP-2
- Drawing of BDP glider

General information
- Type: Transport glider
- National origin: Soviet Union
- Manufacturer: Polikarpov
- Number built: 2

History
- First flight: 1941
- Variant: Polikarpov MP

Polikarpov BDP-ll was a Soviet transport glider developed by Polikarpov during World War II.

== Design ==
After Polikarpov's initial design for an assault glider, given the designation BDP (Boyevoi Desantnyi Planer – troops assault glider), to compete with the Antonov A-7 and Gribovskii G-11 was rejected, the design was re-surrected, in modified form, in 1942, as the BDP-2.

The BDP-2 was an all-wood high wing glider capable of carrying 20 troops and a pilot. The BDP-2 took-off on jettisonable twin wheel dollies and landed on large wooden skids either side of the fuselage.

== Specifications ==
Data from Aircraft of the Soviet Union : the encyclopaedia of Soviet aircraft since 1917,

General characteristics

- Crew: 1
- Capacity: 20 troops
- Length: 13.5 m (44 ft 3 in)
- Wingspan: 20 m (65 ft 7 in)
- Height: 3.2 m (10 ft 6 in)
- Wing area: 44.72 m^{2} (481.4 sq ft)
- Empty weight: 1,923 kg (4,239 lb)
- Gross weight: 3,000 kg (6,614 lb)

Armament

- Guns: 7 × light infantry machine guns
