= Polikarpov MP =

1940s Soviet military air transport

General information
- Type: Transport
- National origin: Soviet Union
- Manufacturer: Polikarpov
- Number built: 1

History
- First flight: 1943
- Developed from: Polikarpov BDP-2

The Polikarpov MP (Поликарпов М П - Motoplanior - motor glider) was a Soviet transport aircraft developed by Polikarpov during World War II.

== Development ==
Experiments undertaken by Aeroflot to use the Polikarpov BDP-2 as a cargo transport led to the idea of turning the glider into a motorized aircraft, with the possibility of a small series being produced. Two 145 hp M-11F cowled engines coupled with 2.35-meter propellers taken from Polikarpov Po-2 biplanes were installed on the leading edge of the wing. In 1943 the prototype was built by the Novosibirsk Factory No.51, with acceptance tests carried out at the Moscow Central Airfield by Captain SA Anojin. Seventy flights were undertaken by several test pilots between July 12 and September 10. When towed by a Tupolev SB, the MP was able to achieve speeds of up to 270 km and a height of 4,500 m. The test pilots concluded that the stability was good and it was easy to pilot.

The plane was evaluated by the Soviet Airborne Forces between September 10–13 with various tests loads of roughly 4,000 kg:

- Eleven troops with light weapons
- Anti-tank artillery unit (6 troops with a 45 mm anti-tank gun and 40 shells)
- DShK anti-aircraft battery (5 troops with ammunition)
- Light anti-tank group (ten troops and 3 anti-tank weapons)
- 3 Velocette-style motorcycles
- 2 Indian-style motorcycles

After these evaluations the aircraft was recommended for use by paratroopers and transport with series production proposed. Unfortunately for Polikarpov, by the winter of 1943 the Red Army had liberated a large part of the previously German-occupied territory and the need for the MP was heavily reduced. Only the one prototype was completed.

== Design ==
The MP was an all-wood high wing transport capable of carrying 4,000 kg (combined) of troops and equipment, plus the pilot. Although it was meant to be able to take off and land on its own, the low engine power meant that when it was fully loaded it often had to be towed to the designated area, but could return to the landing site under its own power.

The MP featured two doors, one 860x900 mm at the front starboard side and one 850x950 mm on the rear port side in the lower part of the fuselage, as well as a hatch behind the cargo area. The pilot also had a wooden covered emergency hatch. The lower area of the cabin was glazed to improve visibility. Benches were attached to the fuselage's frame on both sides with a 600 mm corridor in-between. Wheels and rubber shock absorbers were added to the ski-type landing gear inherited from the glider.

The MP was unarmed, but had ports and attachments for seven DP-type machine guns. Armor consisted of twelve 5.5 mm thick 480x550 mm plates, which added 127 kg to the already overburdened weight.

== Specifications ==
Data from Aircraft of the Soviet Union : the encyclopaedia of Soviet aircraft since 1917,

General characteristics

- Crew: 1
- Capacity: 20 troops
- Length: 13.5 m (44 ft 3 in)
- Wingspan: 20 m (65 ft 7 in)
- Height: 3.2 m (10 ft 6 in)
- Wing area: 44.7 m^{2} (481 sq ft)
- Empty weight: 2,420 kg (5,335 lb)
- Gross weight: 3,500 kg (7,716 lb)
- Fuel capacity: 365 kg (805 lb) fuel and oil
- Powerplant: 2 × Shvetsov M-11F 5-cylindetr air-cooled radial piston engines, 108 kW (145 hp) each
- Propellers: 2-bladed fixed-pitch propellers, 2.35 m (7 ft 9 in) diameter

Performance

- Maximum speed: 172 km/h (107 mph, 93 kn) at sea level
- Landing speed: 98 km/h (61 mph; 53 kn)
- Range: 930 km (580 mi, 500 nmi) at 130 km/h (81 mph; 70 kn)
- Endurance: 7 hours
- Service ceiling: 2,000 m (6,600 ft)
- Time to altitude: 10,009 m (32,838 ft) in 12 minutes 30 seconds
- Wing loading: 78.5 kg/m^{2} (16.1 lb/sq ft)
- Take-off distance: 480 m (1,570 ft) at 3,500 kg (7,700 lb)

Armament

- Guns: Ports for 7 × light infantry machine guns
