= PZL Bielsko SZD-52 =

Polish single-seat glider, 1981

SZD-52

General information
- Type: Standard-class sailplane
- National origin: Poland
- Manufacturer: PZL Bielsko
- Designer: Adam Kurbiel
- Number built: 8

History
- First flight: 28 February 1981

External image
- SZD-52-2 Krokus in flight

The PZL Bielsko SZD-52 is a Polish single-seat standard class sailplane produced by PZL Bielsko. It is a cantilever high-wing monoplane with a T-tail and has a retractable main landing gear and a fixed tailwheel. The wings have integral water ballast tanks.

== Variants ==
SZD-52 Jantar 15
SZD-52-1 Jantar 15SI
SZD-52-2 Krokus
SZD-52-3 Krokus S
SZD-52-4 Krokus C

== Specifications (SZD52-3) ==
Data from

General characteristics

- Crew: 1
- Length: 7 m (23 ft 0 in)
- Wingspan: 15 m (49 ft 3 in)
- Height: 1.55 m (5 ft 1 in)
- Wing area: 10.3 m^{2} (111 sq ft)
- Aspect ratio: 21.8
- Empty weight: 248 kg (547 lb)
- Gross weight: 370 kg (816 lb) without water ballast

Performance

- Never exceed speed: 255 km/h (158 mph, 138 kn)

== See also ==
Related lists

- List of gliders
