= Piana Canova PC.500 =

PC.500
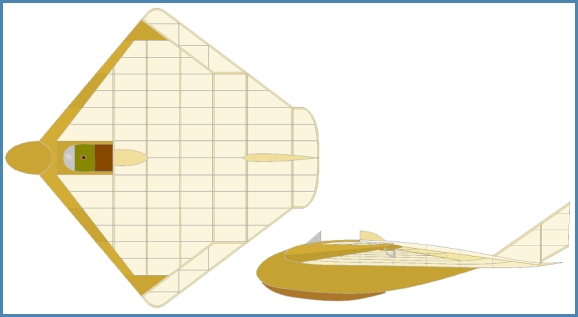

General information
- Type: Aerobatic glider
- National origin: Italy
- Designer: Flaminio Piana Canova
- Number built: 1

History
- First flight: 1937
- Developed from: Piana Canova PC.100

The Piana Canova PC.500 single-seat glider was a development of the earlier PC.100 primary glider, more robust and capable of aerobatics. Both were designed and built in Italy in the mid-1930s and they shared an unusual thick profile wing of rhomboidal plan. Only one PC.500 was built.

== Design and development ==
The PC.500 shared the distinctive rhomboidal wing plan of the earlier PC.100. This was almost square, with a diagonal defining the span. An exactly square wing of this orientation has an aspect ratio of 2:1, very close to that of the PC.500. Lower aspect ratio wings can operate at higher angles of attack before stalling. The wings of the PC.100 and PC.500 had the same airfoil and aspect ratio; the PC.100 stalled at 35°. Piana Canova used the thick wing profile to brace the PC.500's wing internally, producing a clean, cantilever high-wing monoplane. Structurally the wing was entirely wooden and its covering fabric.

The PC.500 had conventional control surfaces. Tapered ailerons were mounted on the outboard wing trailing edges and an elliptical one piece elevator was mounted on the rounded off extreme trailing edge. Its fin was broad and triangular, with the rudder hinged above the wing trailing edge. The rudder was straight edged with rounded corners and cut away at its base to allow upward elevator movement. Below the wing there was a long, shallow ventral fin which also ended at the trailing edge.

The PC.500 was not a flying wing in that it had a fuselage, though this was short, with its nose only a little ahead of the leading edge and its underside curving upwards to meet the wing just aft of mid-chord. It was ovoid in section and did not extend above the upper wing surface. The open, single-seat cockpit was immediately behind the leading edge and was provided with a faired, padded headrest. Its landing gear was fixed and conventional, with its main wheels on split axles fixed to the fuselage bottom and with sloping legs to the fuselage sides. A small tailwheel was fitted to the rear end of the ventral fin.

Overall, the PC.500 was designed to be robust, capable of aerobatics and suitable for launch by aero tows. In 1937 the single example went to the Guidonia Experimental Centre for testing. Test flights included high altitude work but the judging committee were not convinced by this novel glider.

As well as his two gliders, both built and flown, Piana Canova designed a powered aircraft in 1935 with a rhomboidal wing. Though wind tunnel tested, this may never have been built but another powered rhomboidal wing Canova design, the SIA 140 was completed.

== Specifications ==
Data from Pedrelli p.199

General characteristics

- Crew: One
- Length: 6.40 m (21 ft 0 in)
- Wingspan: 6.06 m (19 ft 11 in)
- Wing area: 17.80 m^{2} (191.6 sq ft)
- Aspect ratio: 1.94
- Empty weight: 100 kg (220 lb)
- Gross weight: 175 kg (386 lb)
