= ProFe Banjo =

Czech glider

Banjo

General information
- Type: Glider and motor glider
- National origin: Czech Republic
- Manufacturer: ProFe
- Status: In production
- Number built: 4 (Banjo model, 1998)

The ProFe Banjo is a family of Czech high-wing, strut-braced, T-tailed gliders and motor gliders designed and produced by ProFe in kit form for amateur construction.

== Design and development ==
Named for the musical instrument of the same name, the Banjo series of gliders consists of three models, the basic glider model, a powered version and the two seat DuoBanjo.

The Banjo sailplane is of mixed construction. Its 13.3 m (43.6 ft) span wing is strut-braced with one lift strut per side and uses a plywood box spar and spruce wing ribs, with the leading edge of the wing covered in plywood and the rear portion covered in aircraft fabric covering. The nose ribs are expanded polystyrene while the ailerons are made of wood and covered in fabric. The wing airfoil is an SM701 at the wing root transitioning to a Wortmann FX-60-126 at the wing tip, while the tailplane uses a Wortmann FX-71-L-150/30 airfoil. The fuselage is of fibreglass monocoque construction, while its one-piece bubble canopy is made from polycarbonate. The aircraft has fixed monowheel landing gear with a wheel brake and upper wing surface air brakes.

== Variants ==
Banjo
Unpowered single-seat sailplane with a 13.3 m (43.6 ft) span wing. Four were reported completed and flying in 1998. In production in 2011.
Banjo-MH
Powered version of the Banjo, with a retractable tractor configuration Hirth F33 two stroke 21 kW (28 hp) motor powering a two-bladed wooden propeller. Fuel capacity is 14 litres (3.1 imp gal; 3.7 US gal), gross weight is 260 kg (573 lb) and load limits +4 and -2g. The aircraft has a best glide ratio of 28:1. In production in 2011. The Banjo-MH is also marketed by Junkers Profly of Kulmbach, Germany as the Junkers Banjo-MH.
DuoBanjo
Two seats in tandem version, with two side-by-side main wheels mounted in the fuselage and a retractable tractor configuration Rotax 447 two-stroke 30 kW (40 hp) motor powering a ProFe 1.4 m (4.6 ft) two-bladed wooden propeller. Wing span is 16 m (52.5 ft), fuel capacity is 27 litres (5.9 imp gal; 7.1 US gal), gross weight is 460 kg (1,014 lb) and load limits +4.4 and -2.4g. The aircraft has a best glide ratio of 29:1. In production in 2011.

== Specifications (Banjo sailplane) ==
Data from Purdy and company website

General characteristics

- Crew: one
- Length: 6.3 m (20.6 ft)
- Wingspan: 13.29 m (43.60 ft)
- Wing area: 10.5 m^{2} (113 sq ft)
- Airfoil: Wing root: SM701, wing tip: Wortmann FX-60-126
- Empty weight: 100 kg (220 lb)
- Gross weight: 200 kg (440 lb)

Performance

- Stall speed: 50 km/h (31 mph, 27 kn)
- Never exceed speed: 140 km/h (87 mph, 76 kn)
- g limits: +4.4/-2.2
- Maximum glide ratio: 28:1
- Rate of sink: 0.68 m/s (134 ft/min)
- Wing loading: 19.0 kg/m^{2} (3.89 lb/sq ft)

== See also ==
Related lists

- List of gliders
