= Prue Two =

American glider

Two

General information
- Type: Glider
- National origin: United States
- Designer: Irving Prue
- Status: Removed from the FAA registry and listed as "destroyed" in 1992
- Primary user: Irving Prue
- Number built: One

History
- Introduction date: 1959
- First flight: 1959
- Variant: Prue IIA

The Prue Two was an American high-wing, two-seat glider that was designed and built by Irving Prue, first flying in 1959.

== Design and development ==
Prue designed the Prue Two as a high-performance two-seater, completing it and flying it in 1959.

The aircraft was of all-metal construction, except for its fiberglass nose cone. The wing was of a 64.5 ft (19.7 m) span, employed a NACA 63-618A airfoil and featured large dive brakes. The wing was a three-piece design, with a centre section and two wing tips. Due to its large wing area it was nicknamed "Aluminum Overcast". The tail was a conventional low tail, in contrast to Prue's favoured V-tail on earlier designs. The landing gear was a retractable monowheel.

The Prue Two was the basis for the Prue IIA, which first flew in October 1964 and was used to set several world multi-place records.

== Operational history ==
Soaring Magazine reported in 1983 that Prue still owned the machine and was still flying it at that time. The Federal Aviation Administration reports that it was destroyed and removed it from their aircraft register 10 February 1992.

== Specifications (Prue Two) ==
Data from Soaring

General characteristics

- Crew: one
- Capacity: one passenger
- Wingspan: 64 ft 6 in (19.66 m)
- Wing area: 228 sq ft (21.2 m^{2})
- Aspect ratio: 18.3:1
- Airfoil: NACA 63-618A
- Empty weight: 1,090 lb (494 kg)
- Gross weight: 1,600 lb (726 kg)

Performance

- Maximum glide ratio: 36:1 at 58 mph (93 km/h)
- Rate of sink: 131 ft/min (0.67 m/s) at 46 mph (74 km/h)
- Wing loading: 7.0 lb/sq ft (34 kg/m^{2}) when flown dual

== See also ==
- Aluminum Overcast

Related lists

- List of gliders
