= PIK-3 =

Sailplane produced in Finland

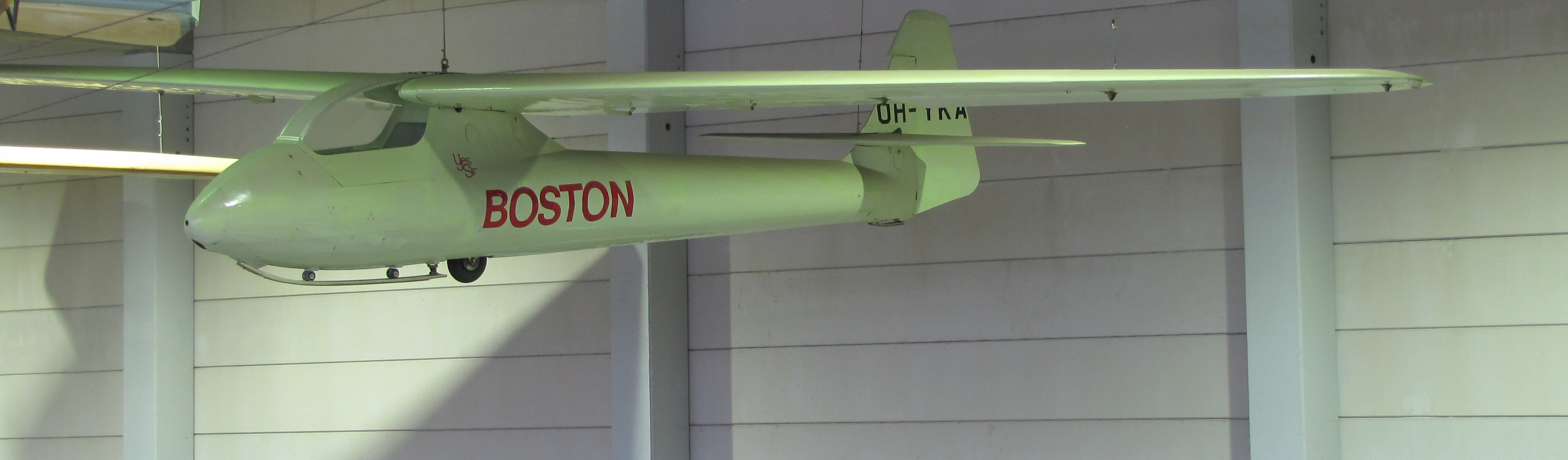
- PIK-3a in Finnish Aviation Museum

General information
- Type: Sailplane
- National origin: Finland
- Manufacturer: Polyteknikkojen Ilmailukerho
- Designer: Lars Norrmen and Ilkka Lounama
- Number built: 40

History
- First flight: 1950

The PIK-3 (Polyteknikkojen Ilmailukerho – Finnish institute of technology students flying club) was a sailplane produced in Finland in the 1950s and 60s. It was designed to be a cheap and easy-to-build aircraft to equip the country's gliding clubs as their standard single-seat machine. It was a conventional design for its day, with a high wing and conventional empennage. Construction was of wood throughout, skinned in plywood.

Design work commenced in 1942, but the prototype did not fly until 1950. Antti Koskinen refined the design for production as the PIK-3A and then further modified the design by replacing the flaps with air brakes, which was designated the PIK-3B.

By the end of the 1950s, a third modification of the original design was carried out by Olavi Roininen as the PIK-3C. This had completely new wings of 15 m (49 ft 3 in) to allow it to compete in the Standard Class. The prototype flew on 20 May 1958, and the design was then modified for production by Suomen Ilmailuliitto.

== Variants ==
- PIK-3 – first prototype with wingspan of 13 m (47 ft 8 in)
- PIK-3A Kanttikolmonen – initial production version of PIK-3
- PIK-3B – PIK-3A with air brakes in place of flaps
- PIK-3C Kajava – PIK-3B with new wings of 15 m (49 ft 3 in) span

== Specifications (PIK-3c) ==
Data from Jane's World Sailplanes and Motor Gliders, The World's Sailplanes:Die Segelflugzeuge der Welt:Les Planeurs du Monde

General characteristics

- Crew: 1
- Length: 6.6 m (21 ft 8 in) (PIK-3 – 6.5 m (21 ft 4 in))
- Wingspan: 15 m (49 ft 3 in) (PIK-3 – 13 m (42 ft 8 in))
- Mid wingspan: 1 m (3 ft 3 in)
- Height: 1 m (3 ft 3 in)
- Wing area: 13.1 m^{2} (141 sq ft) (PIK-3 – 13 m^{2} (140 sq ft))
- Aspect ratio: 17.1 (PIK-3 – 13)
- Airfoil: Göttingen 549 (PIK-3 – Göttingen 693)
- Empty weight: 165 kg (364 lb) (PIK-3 – 135 kg (298 lb))
- Max takeoff weight: 280 kg (617 lb) (PIK-3 – 240 kg (530 lb))

Performance

- Stall speed: 55 km/h (34 mph, 30 kn)
- Never exceed speed: 235 km/h (146 mph, 127 kn) (PIK-3 – 200 km/h (124.3 mph; 108.0 kn))
- Rough air speed max: 145 km/h (90.1 mph; 78.3 kn) (PIK-3 – 130 km/h (80.8 mph; 70.2 kn))
- Aerotow speed: 140 km/h (87.0 mph; 75.6 kn) (PIK-3 – 130 km/h (80.8 mph; 70.2 kn))
- Winch launch speed: 110 km/h (68.4 mph; 59.4 kn) (PIK-3 – 100 km/h (62.1 mph; 54.0 kn))
- Terminal velocity: with full air-brakes at max all-up weight 200 km/h (124 mph; 108 kn) (PIK-3 – 180 km/h (111.8 mph; 97.2 kn))
- g limits: +5 -2.5 (PIK-3 – +4 -2)
- Rate of sink: 0.61 m/s (120 ft/min) at 65 km/h (40.4 mph; 35.1 kn)) (PIK-3 – 0.76 m/s (149.6 ft/min) at 61 km/h (37.9 mph; 32.9 kn))
- Lift-to-drag: 30:1 at 75 km/h (46.6 mph; 40.5 kn)) (PIK-3 – 25:1 at 72 km/h (44.7 mph; 38.9 kn))
- Wing loading: 21.4 kg/m^{2} (4.4 lb/sq ft) PIK-3 – 18.5 kg/m^{2} (3.79 lb/sqft)

== See also ==
Aircraft of comparable role, configuration, and era Schleicher Ka-6

- Slingsby Skylark 2
