= Prue IIA =

American glider

IIA

General information
- Type: Glider
- National origin: United States
- Manufacturer: Ed Minghelle
- Designer: Irving Prue
- Status: Sole example in the National Soaring Museum
- Primary user: Ed Minghelle
- Number built: One

History
- Introduction date: 1964
- First flight: October 1964
- Developed from: Prue Two

The Prue IIA is an American, high-wing, two-seat, T-tailed glider that was designed by Irving Prue and constructed by Ed Minghelle of Palmdale, California.

== Design and development ==
Based on the Prue Two, the IIA incorporates many changes to the basic design, including a T-tail in place of a low-tail, fixed instead of retractable landing gear, a shorter two-piece wing instead of a three-piece wing and an empty weight that is 210 lb (95 kg) lighter. The Prue IIA was built by Minghelle between 1961 and 1964, culminating in a first flight in October 1964.

The Prue IIA has a 60 ft (18.3 m) wing that employs a NACA 63-618 airfoil. The aircraft is of all-metal construction and seats two in tandem under a long single-piece canopy.

Only one Prue IIA was ever built.

== Operational history ==
The Prue IIA was used to set several multi-place glider records. It held the world out-and-return record of 366.88 mi (590.44 km) for a period of six months in 1967. A second world out-and-return record was set in 1972, flying 425.3 mi (684.5 km) from Pearblossom, California. In 1967 it was also flown to a world multi-place declared goal record of 322.35 mi (519 km).

The IIA was removed from the Federal Aviation Administration aircraft registry on 16 March 1989 and now belongs to the National Soaring Museum.

== Aircraft on display ==
- National Soaring Museum - sole example, listed as "in storage".

== Specifications (Prue IIA) ==
Data from Sailplane Directory and Soaring

General characteristics

- Crew: one
- Capacity: one passenger
- Wingspan: 60 ft 0 in (18.29 m)
- Wing area: 185 sq ft (17.2 m^{2})
- Aspect ratio: 18.3
- Airfoil: NACA 63-618
- Empty weight: 880 lb (399 kg)
- Gross weight: 1,350 lb (612 kg)

Performance

- Maximum glide ratio: 36:1 at 60 mph (97 km/h)
- Rate of sink: 120 ft/min (0.61 m/s) at 45 mph (72 km/h)
- Wing loading: 6.2 lb/sq ft (30 kg/m^{2})

== See also ==
Related lists

- List of gliders
