= Piana Canova PC.100 =

PC.100
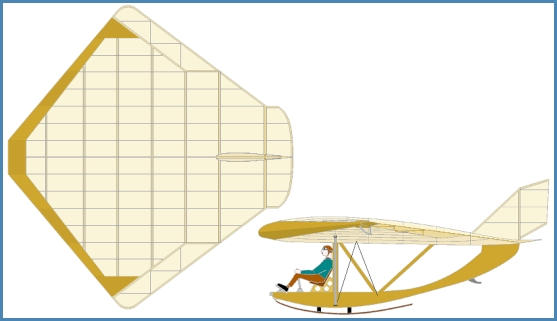

General information
- Type: Experimental primary glider
- National origin: Italy
- Designer: Flaminio Piana Canova
- Number built: 1

History
- First flight: 21 September 1934
- Developed into: Piana Canova PC.500

The Piana Canova PC.100 was a primary glider designed and built in Italy in the 1930s. It had many of the characteristics of these simple aircraft but differed greatly in using a wing of rhomboidal plan. Only one was built.

== Design and development ==
The PC.100 was designed as a primary glider and was intended as a Zögling replacement. Apart from its wing it was similar to the Zögling, with a single seat perched in the open on the upper edge of a fuselage beam. As with other primary gliders of the early 1930s, the beam was linked by three struts to the wing centre section and by a pair of single struts out to the wing at mid-chord and at about one third span. However, the PC.100 differed radically from its predecessors in its wing planform, which was rhomboidal. Indeed, the included angles were almost equal and the planform almost square, flying along a diagonal. A square wing of this form would have an aspect ratio of 2:1 and the PC.100's aspect ratio was very close to this. Low aspect ratio wings produce less lift than high aspect ones at the same angle of attack but can operate at higher angles before reaching the stall. The PC.100 stalled above 35°. Its wings were fabric covered.

Despite its unusual wing, control of the PC.100 involved the standard surfaces. Ailerons were mounted on the outboard wing trailing edges and a conventional one piece elevator was mounted on the cropped rear vertex. Aft of the first two beam to central wing struts the fuselage turned upwards, sloping towards the wing just ahead of the elevator hinge where it broadened into a short fin. This was continued above the wing as a triangular fin, carrying a rhomboidal rudder with its under edge sloped to allow upward elevator movement. Landing forces were absorbed by a short, strongly curved, rubber sprung skid, though a conventional undercarriage could be attached to the fuselage beam just aft of the pilot's seat.

On 21 September 1934 the PC.100 flew for the first time, piloted by Ettore Cattaneo, after a winch launch. It is claimed that its flight characteristics were superior to those of the Zögling.

The PC.100 was developed two years later into the PC.500, which used a wing of similar planform but mounted on a more robust fuselage pod with a wheeled undercarriage. He also designed a powered aircraft in 1935 with this planform.

== Specifications ==
Data from Pedrelli p.197

General characteristics

- Crew: One
- Length: 5.40 m (17 ft 9 in)
- Wingspan: 5.90 m (19 ft 4 in)
- Wing area: 17.80 m^{2} (191.6 sq ft)
- Aspect ratio: 1.94
- Empty weight: 100 kg (220 lb)
- Gross weight: 175 kg (386 lb)
