= ProFe =

Czech company

- Company type: Private company
- Industry: Aerospace
- Founded: 1992
- Founder: Václav Brandejs and Ivan Brandejs
- Headquarters: Nové Město nad Metují, Czech Republic
- Products: Kit aircraft
- Website: www.profe.cz

ProFe is a Czech aircraft manufacturer. The company was founded in 1992 by Václav Brandejs and Ivan Brandejs to produce kit aircraft, particularly gliders and motor gliders.

The company also manufactures glider trailers.

== Aircraft ==
Summary of aircraft built by ProFe
Model name	First flight	Number built	Type
ProFe Mini Straton D-7	1988		Single seat motor glider
ProFe Straton D-8		118 (1998)	Single seat motor glider
ProFe D-8 Moby Dick		37 (1998)	Two-seat motor glider
ProFe D-10 Tukan		4 (1998)	Two-seat motor glider
ProFe Banjo		4 (1998)	Single-seat glider
ProFe Banjo-MH			Single seat motor glider
ProFe DuoBanjo			Two-seat motor glider
