= Prue Super Standard =

American glider

Super Standard

General information
- Type: Glider
- National origin: United States
- Designer: Irving Prue
- Status: No longer in production
- Number built: Three

History
- Introduction date: 1962
- Developed from: Prue Standard

The Prue Super Standard is an American, high-wing, single-seat, FAI Standard Class glider that was designed by Irving Prue in 1962 as a development of the Prue Standard.

== Design and development ==
After Prue fielded the Standard in 1961 he quickly set about improving the design based on initial experience. The Super Standard appeared as a result, in 1962.

The Super Standard incorporated many changes, including a conventional low-tail to replace the Standard's V-tail, which was intended to reduce induced drag in circling flight. Other changes included a two-piece canopy, a fuselage with less height, trailing edge dive brakes and the use of a different airfoil. Whereas the Standard employs the NACA 63-618 airfoil, the Super uses the NACA 65-518. As required by the Standard Class rules, the Super Standard has no water ballast and the landing gear is a fixed monowheel.

The wing skins of the prototype Super are thick ones made from magnesium that allow fewer wing ribs to be used. Later Supers built used aluminium wing skins, including the conforming certification prototype. Despite the improvements, the Super's glider ratio and minimum sink rates are identical to the Standard's.

Prue pursued Federal Aviation Administration aircraft type certification for the Super Standard in anticipation of series production. The type certificate was awarded on 28 December 1964, but only three aircraft were completed, the prototype in the Experimental - amateur-built category, one in the Experimental - certification compliance category and one certified example.

== Operational history ==
The famous sailplane photographer, Alex Aldott, set the Hungarian national distance record of 748 km (465 mi) in a Prue Super Standard.

In June 2011 two Super Standards were still registered with the FAA, with the third listed as having its registration revoked.

== Specifications (Super Standard) ==
Data from Sailplane Directory, Soaring and Type Certificate G1we

General characteristics

- Crew: one
- Wingspan: 49 ft 3 in (15 m)
- Wing area: 121.5 sq ft (11.29 m^{2})
- Aspect ratio: 19.96:1
- Airfoil: NACA 65-518 laminar flow airfoil
- Empty weight: 446 lb (202 kg)
- Gross weight: 725 lb (329 kg)

Performance

- Never exceed speed: 120 mph (190 km/h, 100 kn)
- Maximum glide ratio: 35:1 at 56 mph (90 km/h)
- Rate of sink: 129 ft/min (0.66 m/s) at 44 mph (71 km/h)
- Wing loading: 6.0 lb/sq ft (29 kg/m^{2})

== See also ==
Related lists

- List of gliders
