= ProFe D-8 Moby Dick =

Czech glider

D-8 Moby Dick
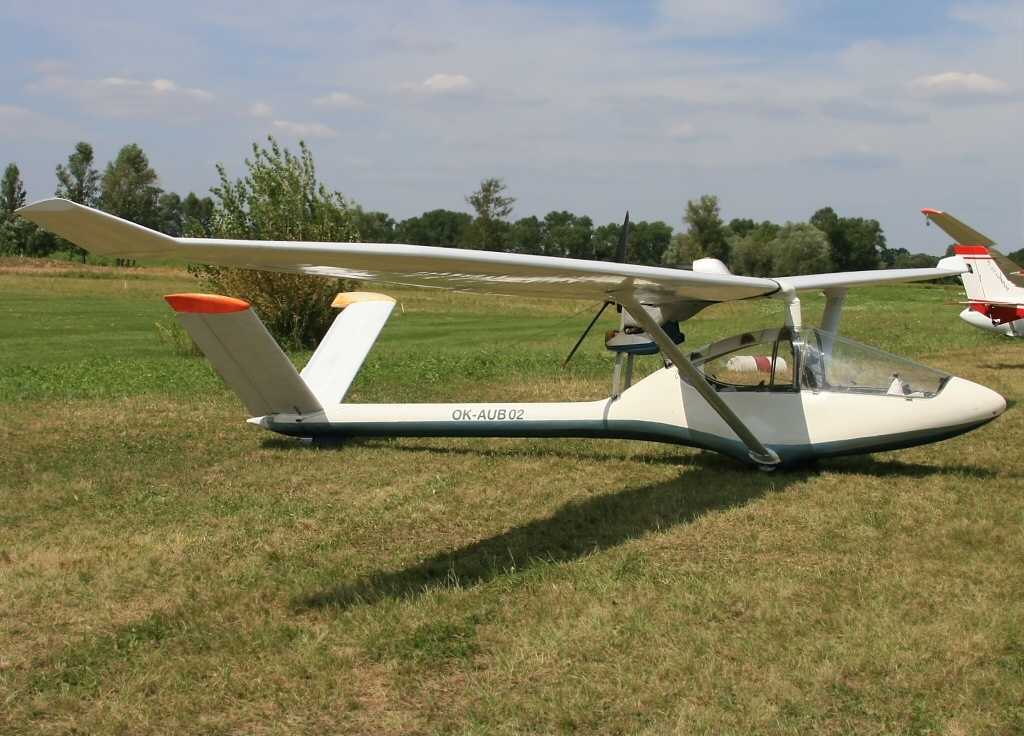

General information
- Type: Motor glider
- National origin: Czech Republic
- Manufacturer: ProFe
- Designer: Oldřich Olšanský, C.Sc.
- Status: production completed
- Number built: 118 (Straton D8 model, 1998); 37 (Moby Dick model, 1998)

History
- Introduction date: 1988 (D-7)

The ProFe D-8 Moby Dick is a family of Czech pusher configuration, parasol wing, strut-braced, V-tailed, motor gliders that was designed by Oldřich Olšanský, M.Sc, and produced by ProFe as well by several amateur builders according to available plans. The aircraft is named for the great white whale of Herman Melville's novel of the same name and was supplied as a kit for amateur construction.

== Design and development ==
The first glider in the series was the single seat Mini Straton D-7, which was designed in 1988 and first shown in the United States at AirVenture in 1992. This was followed by the improved single seat Straton D-8 and the D-8 Moby Dick two seater. All aircraft in the series share the same unusual configuration.

The aircraft are built around a predominantly aluminium frame, with use of fibreglass and aircraft fabric covering. The Moby Dick model also incorporates wood in the structure. The fuselage is of conventional sailplane type in appearance, but the semi-tapered wing is suspended above the fuselage on cabane struts, supported by lift struts, with the pusher engine mounted at the rear of the wing. The Straton D-8 has a monowheel landing gear, while the Moby Dick has two closely spaced, fuselage-mounted wheels. All models have optional outrigger wing tip wheels.

== Variants ==
Mini Straton D-7
Single seat original model
Straton D-8
Improved single seat model with a 12 m (39 ft) wingspan. developed for the American market. It incorporates many improvements in both construction and performance and can be powered with Trabant or Rotax engines. There were 118 reported flying in 1998.
D-8 Moby Dick
Two seat development of the Straton D-8, with a 13 m (43 ft) wingspan, 14.00 m^{2} (150.7 sq ft) wing area, empty weight 414 lb (188 kg), gross weight 851 lb (386 kg), stressed to +4/-2 g. Standard engine is the 40 hp (30 kW) Rotax 447 two stroke aircraft engine. It was reported that 37 were flying in 1998.

== Specifications (Straton D-8) ==
Data from Purdy

General characteristics

- Crew: one
- Length: 6.1 m (20 ft)
- Wingspan: 12 m (39 ft 4 in)
- Wing area: 10.3 m^{2} (111 sq ft)
- Empty weight: 113 kg (250 lb)
- Gross weight: 213 kg (470 lb)
- Fuel capacity: 19 litres (4.2 imp gal; 5.0 US gal)
- Powerplant: 1 × Trabant , 18 kW (24 hp)
- Propellers: 2-bladed wooden

Performance

- Maximum speed: 130 km/h (80 mph, 70 kn)
- Cruise speed: 97 km/h (60 mph, 52 kn)
- Stall speed: 29 km/h (18 mph, 16 kn)
- Range: 390 km (240 mi, 210 nmi)
- Service ceiling: 4,400 m (14,400 ft)
- Maximum glide ratio: 18:1
- Rate of climb: 2.8 m/s (550 ft/min)
- Wing loading: 20.7 kg/m^{2} (4.23 lb/sq ft)

== See also ==
- List of gliders
