= Peterson MAP-3 Medena =

American glider

MAP-3 Medena
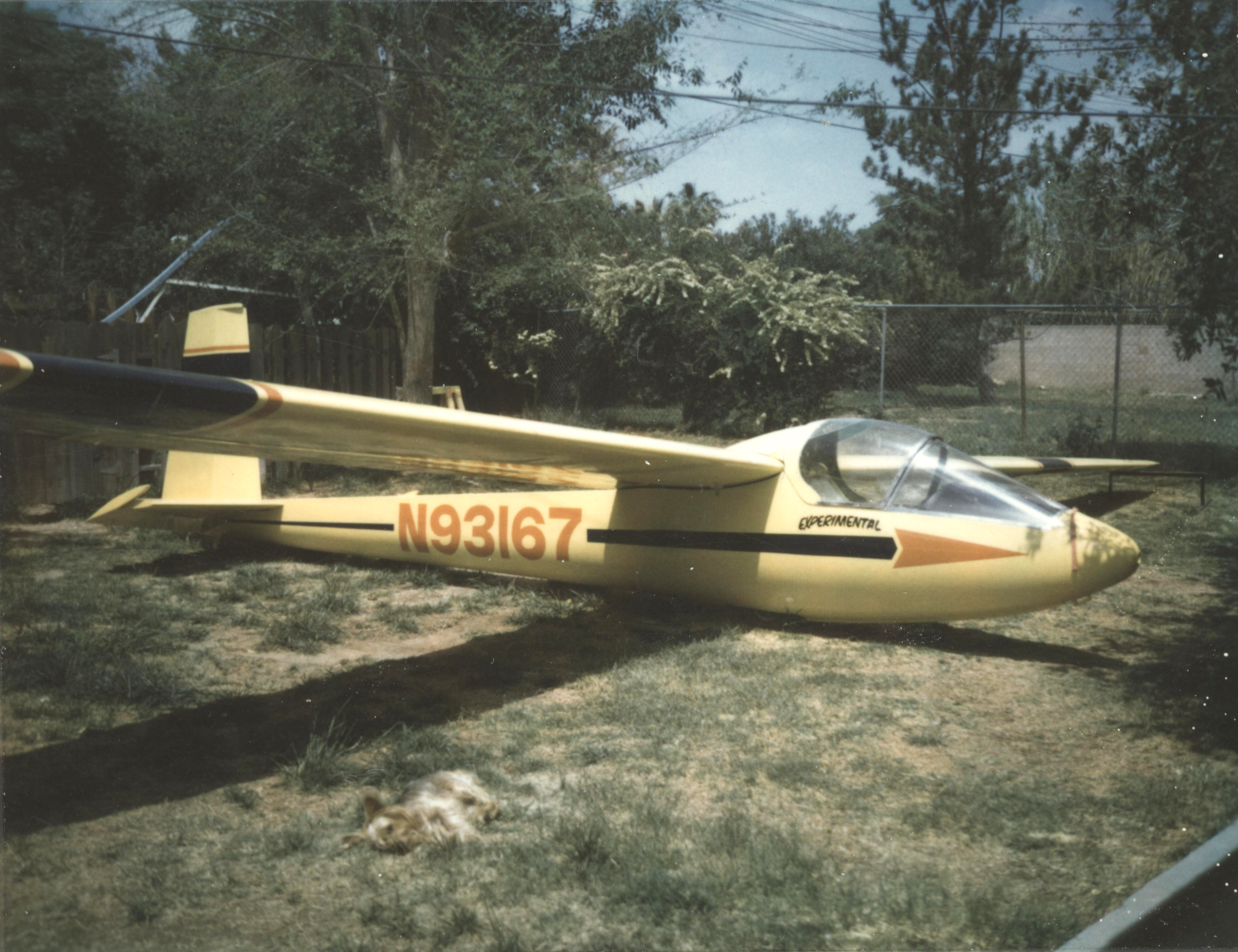

General information
- Type: Glider
- National origin: United States
- Designer: Max A. Peterson
- Status: Production completed

History
- Introduction date: 1966
- First flight: 1966

The Peterson MAP-3 Medena is an American shoulder-wing, single-seat, FAI Open Class glider that was designed and constructed by Max A. Peterson, first flying in 1966.

== Design and development ==
Peterson completed the Medena prototype and flew it in 1966. The designation indicates the designer's initials.

The aircraft is of mixed construction, with an all-metal structure and a fiberglass cockpit section. The 51 ft (15.5 m) span wings employ a NACA 64(3)-618 airfoil and mount both spoilers and half-span flaps. The flaps can be raised 5° for cruise flight and deployed to 60° for glidepath control on landing. The landing gear is a retractable monowheel.

Only one Medena was constructed.

== Operational history ==
The prototype's wings and tail were damaged in a wind storm in 1967 and the aircraft was rebuilt to incorporate modifications to the tail and aft fuselage. Peterson sold the Medana to Joe Gray in 1971. Ownership transferred to Sam Phillips in May 1975. Ownership transferred to Donald Young/Oren Irich in May 1978. In August 2011 the aircraft was still on the US Federal Aviation Administration registry, although the agency listed its status as "in question"

== Specifications (Medena) ==
Data from Soaring

General characteristics

- Crew: one
- Wingspan: 51 ft 0 in (15.54 m)
- Wing area: 144 sq ft (13.4 m^{2})
- Aspect ratio: 18:1
- Airfoil: NACA 64(3)-618
- Empty weight: 540 lb (245 kg)
- Gross weight: 790 lb (358 kg)

Performance

- Maximum glide ratio: 30:1 at 62 mph (100 km/h)
- Rate of sink: 138 ft/min (0.70 m/s) at 45 mph (72 km/h)
- Wing loading: 5.5 lb/sq ft (27 kg/m^{2})

== See also ==
Related lists

- List of gliders
