= PZL Krosno KR-03 Puchatek =

Polish glider

KR-03 Puchatek
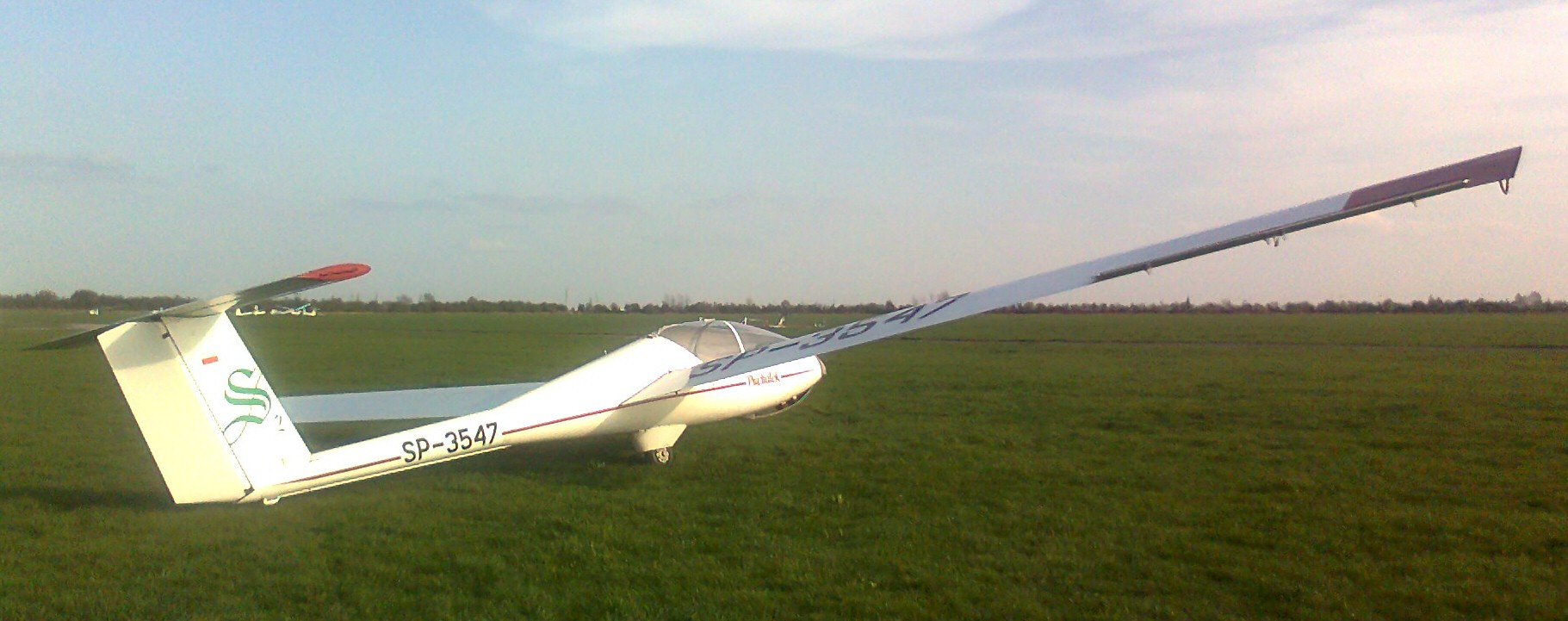

General information
- Type: Glider
- National origin: Poland
- Manufacturer: PZL Krosno
- Designer: Jerzy Krawczyk and Eugeniusz Pelczar
- Status: Production completed
- Number built: about 30

History
- First flight: 1985

The PZL Krosno KR-03 Puchatek is a Polish mid-wing, T-tailed, two-seats-in-tandem, glider that was designed by Jerzy Krawczyk and Eugeniusz Pelczar and produced by PZL Krosno, first flying in 1985.

== Design and development ==
The KR-03 was designed as an ab initio training glider. The name Puchatek is Polish translation of Pooh Bear.

The aircraft is made from aluminium with some parts covered in doped aircraft fabric covering. Its 16.4 m (53.8 ft) span wing employs a Wortmann FX S-02-158 airfoil. The wing features top and bottom Schempp-Hirth-style dive brakes. The landing gear consists of an oleo-pneumatic sprung, non-retractable main wheel, a tail wheel and a rubber sprung nose skid. The Puchatek has a baggage compartment with a capacity of 5 kg (11 lb) for soft baggage items.

The aircraft was type certified in the United States on 6 August 1991, with Barry Aviation of Edgewater, Volusia County, Florida as the US certificate holder.

== Operational history ==
In 1993, a few examples were put into service with the Australian Air Force Cadets (AAFC), totalling to three as of 2012. They are currently assigned to 2 Wing AAFC. They are still in service as of 2014.

As of August 2025 there were 10 KR-03As registered in the United States with the Federal Aviation Administration and 1 KR-03A registered in Canada.

== Variants ==
KR-03A
Main production version.

== Specifications (KR-03A) ==
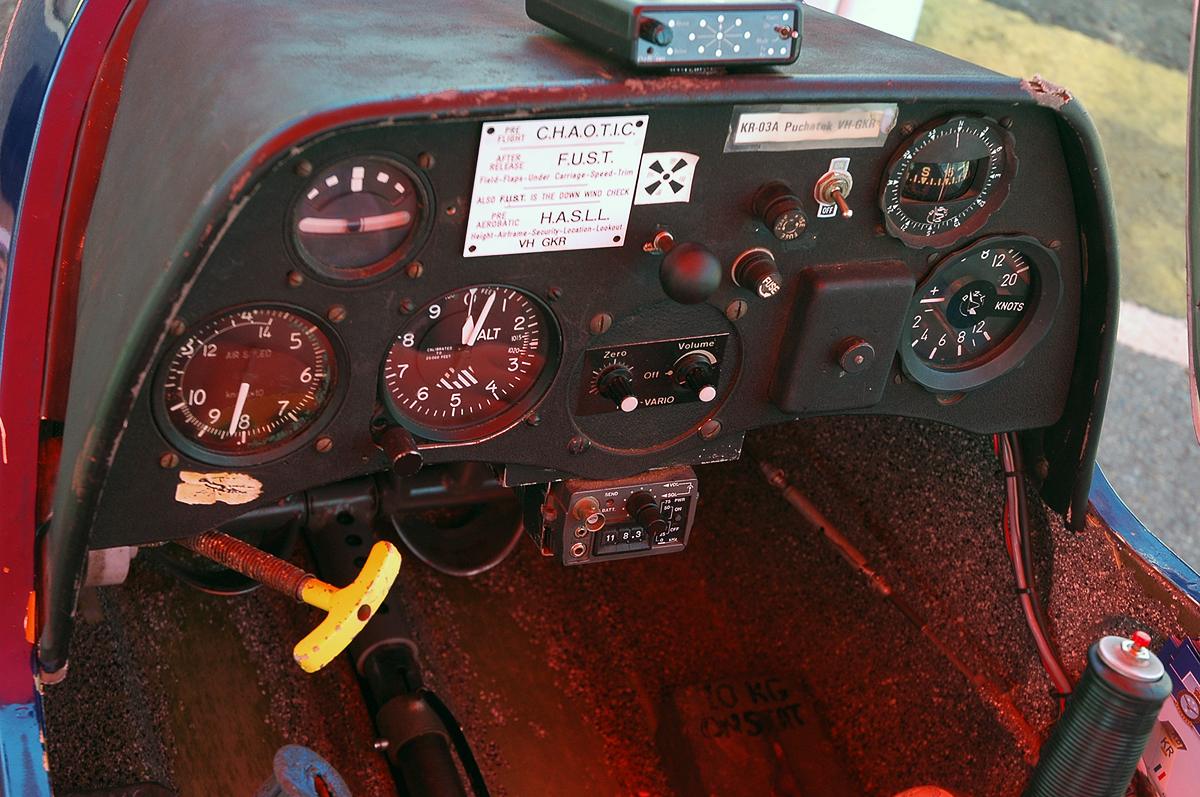
Instrument panel

Data from Sailplane Directory, Type Certificate G56EU and The Incomplete Guide to Airfoil Usage

General characteristics

- Crew: one
- Capacity: one passenger
- Wingspan: 16.4 m (53 ft 10 in)
- Wing area: 19.44 m^{2} (209.3 sq ft)
- Airfoil: Wortmann FX S-02-158
- Empty weight: 350 kg (772 lb)
- Gross weight: 540 kg (1,190 lb)

Performance

- Never exceed speed: 198 km/h (123 mph, 107 kn)
- g limits: +5.3/-2.65
- Maximum glide ratio: 27:1 at 88 km/h (55 mph)
- Rate of sink: 0.78 m/s (154 ft/min)
- Wing loading: 27.78 kg/m^{2} (5.69 lb/sq ft)

== See also ==
Related lists

- List of gliders
