= Politechnika Warszawska PW-2 =

PW-2 Gapa
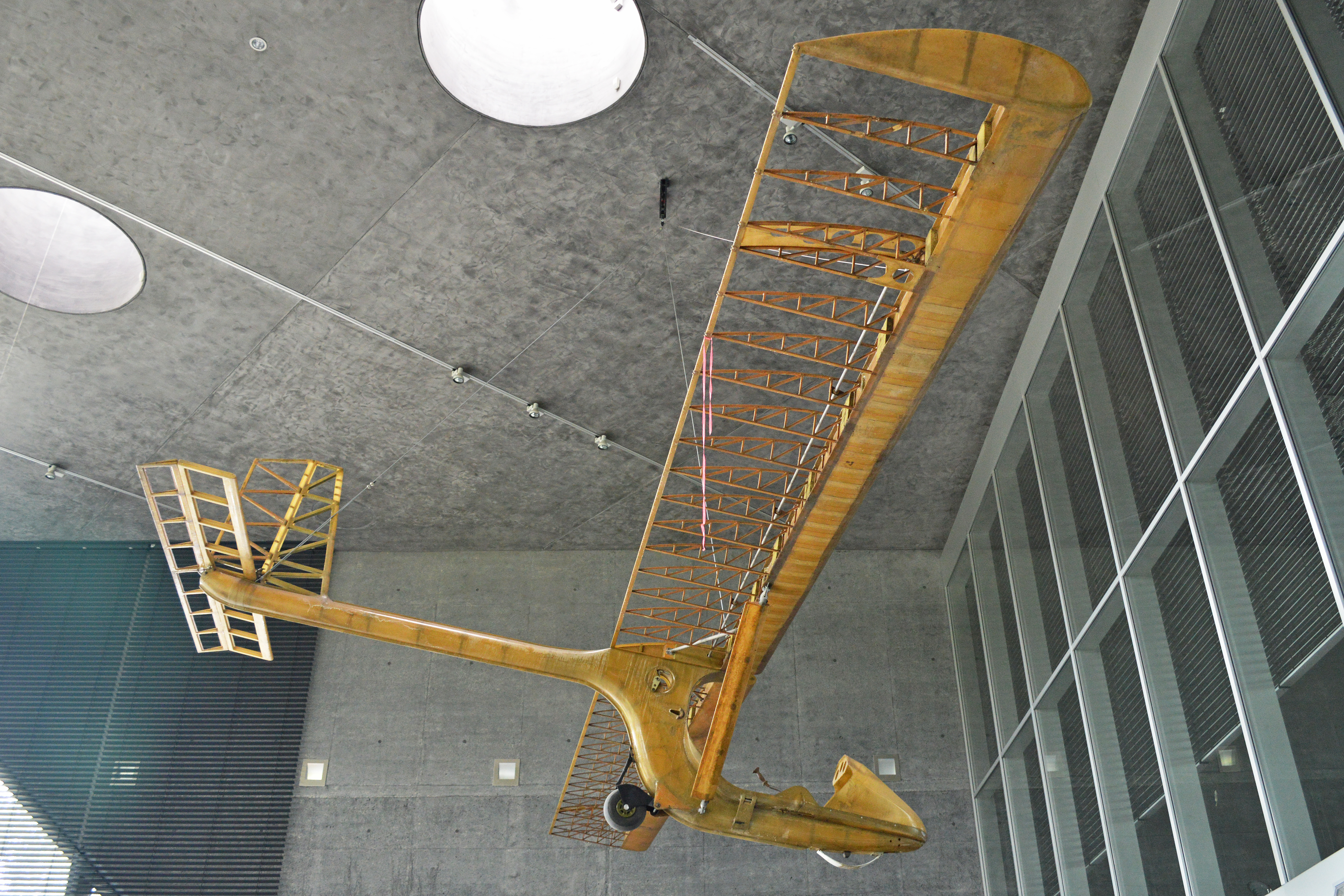
- PW-2D Gapa on display in the Polish Aviation Museum, Kraków, Poland

General information
- Type: Glider
- National origin: Poland
- Manufacturer: DWLKK
- Designer: Warsaw University of Technology
- Status: Production completed

History
- Introduction date: early 1990s
- First flight: 25 July 1985

The Politechnika Warszawska PW-2 (English: Warsaw Polytechnic PW-2), also called the PW-2 Gapa, is a Polish lightweight high-wing, strut-braced single-seat, glider that was designed and built at the Warsaw University of Technology and also produced by DWLKK in the early 1990s. A total number of 19 gliders were built, including variant PW-2D bis.

== Design and development ==
The PW-2 was designed as a lightweight glider of modest performance with an open cockpit. The aircraft was intended to be produced as both a completed aircraft and as a kit for amateur construction.

The aircraft is made from composite material, with its control surfaces covered in doped aircraft fabric covering. Its 11.0 m (36.1 ft) span wing employs an American-designed NACA 4415 airfoil. The maximum glide ratio is 16:1 at 69 km/h (43 mph)

== Operational history ==
In August 2011 five PW-2Ds were registered in the United States with the Federal Aviation Administration. All were in the Experimental - Exhibition/Racing category and all produced in 1992 or 1993.

== Specifications (PW-2D) ==
Data from Sailplane Directory, Jane's All the World's Aircraft 1988-89

General characteristics

- Crew: one
- Length: 5.5 m (18 ft 1 in)
- Wingspan: 11.0 m (36 ft 1 in)
- Height: 2.45 m (8 ft 0 in)
- Wing area: 12.7 m^{2} (137 sq ft)
- Aspect ratio: 9.52:1
- Airfoil: NACA 4415, (PW-2D - NN 18-17)
- Empty weight: 110 kg (243 lb)
- Gross weight: 220 kg (485 lb)

Performance

- Stall speed: 50 km/h (31 mph, 27 kn)
- Never exceed speed: 150 km/h (93 mph, 81 kn) in smooth air

120 km/h (65 kn; 75 mph) in rough air
120 km/h (65 kn; 75 mph) on aero-tow
100 km/h (54 kn; 62 mph) on winch launch

- g limits: +5.3 -2.65
- Maximum glide ratio: 16:1 at 69 km/h (43 mph)
- Rate of sink: 1.1 m/s (220 ft/min) at 58 km/h (36 mph)
- Wing loading: 17.32 kg/m^{2} (3.55 lb/sq ft)

== See also ==
Related lists

- List of gliders
