= List of airlines by foundation date =

This is a list of airlines by foundation date of the company. The list includes airlines founded before December 31, 1930.

Rows with a light-green background indicate the earliest predecessor company of an airline that is still operating, either as a parent company or a subsidiary company (many modern airline holding companies operate more than one airline). Of the airlines still operating, Air France has the oldest predecessor company, Compagnie générale transaérienne, which was established in 1909 and began scheduled fixed-wing passenger operations in 1913. Another Air France predecessor, Lignes Aériennes Farman, began the first regular international passenger service in 1919. KLM is the oldest airline still operating under its original name, Koninklijke Luchtvaartmaatschappij, under which it was established in 1919 and began operating the following year.

== List ==
The date of the first airline service may differ from the foundation date of the company.

Airline	Country	Established	Commenced cargo operations	Commenced passenger operations	Ceased operations, acquired or merged	Corporate successor still operating	Notes
Compagnie générale transaérienne	(French Third Republic)	October 10, 1909	April 12, 1911	March 22, 1913	February 1921	Air France	Began weekly return flights for mail and other cargo items in April 1911 between London and Paris. On March 22, 1913, GGT started the world's first scheduled passenger-carrying fixed-wing flights within France and a week later to Monte Carlo. It was the first French airline and was absorbed by Compagnie des Messageries Aériennes in 1921, making it the first of the companies that would eventually merge to become Air France. It is the oldest corporate predecessor of all airlines still operating.
DELAG	(German Empire) / (Weimar Republic) / (Nazi Germany)	November 16, 1909		June 19, 1910	March 21, 1935		The world’s first passenger and commercial airline, beginning services in June 1910. Operated Zeppelin airships. Merged with Deutsche Zeppelin Reederei (DZR) in 1935, which continued transatlantic flights until the Hindenburg disaster in 1937. Company dissolved in 1940 and re-established in 2001.
Aero Rt.	(Austria-Hungary) / (Kingdom of Hungary)	December 22, 1910			1920		Merged with Magyar Aeroforgalmi Rt (MAEFORT) which in turn, merged with Magyar Legiforgalmi R.T. (MALERT) to form Maszovlet. Later Hungary acquired all the Soviet shares of Maszovlet and renamed it to Malév Hungarian Airlines.
St. Petersburg–Tampa Airboat Line	(United States)	December 17, 1913		January 1, 1914	May 5, 1914		Fixed-wing scheduled passenger commercial aviation service, first in the United States.
Aircraft Transport and Travel	(United Kingdom)	October 5, 1916		August 25, 1919	February 25, 1921	British Airways	British Airways' earliest predecessor company is Aircraft Transport and Travel (AT&T), which began services with the world's first daily scheduled commercial aviation service on August 25, 1919, an international flight from London to Paris. Its assets were used to create Daimler Airway, which continued its services. Through numerous takeovers and mergers, it became a part of British Airways making BA the operating airline with the second oldest predecessor. British Airways merged with Iberia to form International Airlines Group (IAG) on January 21, 2011 and remains in operation as a subsidiary company.
Red Arrow Flying Service	(United States)	1917		February, 1919	2007		As Chalk's Flying Service, the company claimed to have begun a scheduled international service between Florida and the Bahamas in February 1919. Later renamed Chalk's Ocean Airways and then Chalk's International Airlines.
Deutsche Luft-Reederei	(German Empire) / (Weimar Republic)	December 1917		February 5, 1919	1923		Services started February 5, 1919. Became part of Deutscher Aero Lloyd in 1923, merged into Deutsche Luft Hansa in 1926. Founding member of International Air Traffic Association in 1919.
Det Norske Luftfartsrederi	(Norway)	1918			1921		Founding member of IATA
Det Danske Luftfartselskab	(Denmark)	October 29, 1918		August 7, 1920	1951	SAS	Services started August 7, 1920. Part of SAS since 1946. It is the third oldest operating airline through its predecessor companies.
Société des lignes Latécoère	(French Third Republic)	December 25, 1918		1924	October 7, 1933	Air France	Began operations in 1924. It was rebranded as Aéropostale in 1927 and then incorporated into Air France on October 7, 1933. Air France merged with KLM in 2004 to form Air France–KLM and remains in operation as a subsidiary company.
Svensk Lufttrafik	(Sweden)	February 7, 1919		August 7, 1920	1921		Services started August 7, 1920
Lignes Aériennes Farman	(French Third Republic)	February 8, 1919		March 22, 1919	October 7, 1933	Air France	Began a weekly service between Paris and Brussels on March 22, 1919, the world's first international commercial aviation service. Renamed Société Générale des Transports Aériens. Merged with four other airlines to form Air France.
Grands Express Aériens	(French Third Republic)	March 20, 1919			January 1, 1923	Air France	Merged with Compagnie des Messageries Aériennes to form Air Union.
SNETA	(Belgium)	March 31, 1919			May 23, 1923	Brussels Airlines	Merged into Sabena; operations transferred to Delta Air Transport, which later became SN Brussels Airlines; merged with Virgin Express to form Brussels Airlines. It is the fourth oldest operating airline through its predecessor companies.
Compagnie des Messageries Aériennes	(French Third Republic)	April 18, 1919			January 1, 1923	Air France	Merged with Grands Express Aériens to form Air Union.
Daimler Air Hire	(United Kingdom)	June 7, 1919		1921	April, 1921	British Airways	Began as a charter airline; added scheduled services in 1921 after merger with Aircraft Transport and Travel to create Daimler Airway.
Compañía Colombiana de Navegación Aérea – CCNA	(Colombia)	September 26, 1919			July 17, 1922		First airline in Colombia with mail contract with Colombian Government.
Koninklijke Luchtvaartmaatschappij	(Netherlands)	October 7, 1919		May 17, 1920		KLM	KLM was established under the name Koninklijke Luchtvaartmaatschappij by a group of Dutch businessmen and bankers with the support of the Dutch government. The first KLM flight took place on May 17, 1920. During World War II, KLM stopped operating in Europe, but continued in the West Indies as Dutch Caribbean colonies were not occupied by Nazi Germany. After the war, the government took a majority stake, effectively nationalising the airline during that period. KLM merged with Air France in 2004 to form Air France–KLM and remains in operation as a subsidiary company. It is the fifth oldest airline still in operation when considering predecessor companies. It markets itself as the oldest airline still operating under its original name.
SCADTA	(Colombia)	December 5, 1919		September 5, 1920	June 14, 1940	Avianca	Founded as SCADTA in 1919 by Germans and Colombians. American concern during World War II over the German shares of the airline forced SCADTA to merge in 1940 with the smaller state-owned SACO to form Avianca. It the sixth oldest airline still operating by date of foundation of its predecessor. In its past corporate marketing, it has claimed to be the second oldest airline in the world.
Handley Page Transport	(United Kingdom)	1919			March 31, 1924	British Airways	Merged with three other airlines to form Imperial Airways.
Handley Page Indo-Burmese transport	(British Raj)	1919			1921 (Note: Exact date unknown; known to have still been operational at this date)		First airline in India (then under British rule).
Instone Air Line	(United Kingdom)	1919			March 31, 1924	British Airways	Merged with three other airlines to form Imperial Airways.
A/S Aero	(Norway)	January 1920			1921		Merged with Norske Aeroplanfabrik
CFRNA	(French Third Republic) / (Kingdom of Romania)	January 20, 1920			October 7, 1933	Air France	Renamed CIDNA in 1925; the French arm was merged with four other airlines to form Air France; the Romanian arm was renamed LARES.
Queensland and Northern Territory Aerial Services	(Australia)	November 16, 1920		November 2, 1922	October 2, 1947	Qantas	The Queensland and Northern Territory Aerial Services Limited (QANTAS) was founded in 1920 and its first regular passenger services began in 1922. During World War II, most aircraft were used by the RAAF, however limited operations continued within Australia, to/from Singapore and on the Australia-England route. QANTAS was liquidated on 2 October 1947, after the airline was nationalised. The international operations, established in 1934, continued as Qantas Empire Airways (QEA). The current parent entity is Qantas Airways Limited, which was incorporated in 1967. It is the seventh oldest still-active airline by foundation date when considering predecessor companies. In its marketing, it claims to be the world's second oldest airline, and has claimed to be the "oldest continuously operating airline in the world".
Robertson Aircraft Corporation	(United States)	February, 1921	April 15, 1926		1929	American Airlines	American Airlines celebrated the centenary of its earliest predecessor's first mail flight.
Aeronaut	(Estonia)	March 22, 1921			January 11, 1927		Operated the routes: Tallinn-Helsinki, Tallinn-Stockholm, Tallinn-Riga-Königsberg and Tallinn-Tartu-Viljandi-Pärnu. Stopped operations in 1927 due to financial problems.
Aerotarg	(Poland)	May 10, 1921			June 19, 1921		Operated only on the route between Poznań–Warsaw and Poznań–Gdańsk, mainly in order to serve participants and visitors of the first Poznań International Fair.
Daimler Airway	(United Kingdom)	April, 1921			April 1, 1924	British Airways	Daimler Air Hire was combined with the assets of Aircraft Transport and Travel in 1921 to create Daimler Airway. Merged with three other airlines in 1924 to form Imperial Airways.
Mexicana de Aviación	(Mexico)	July 12, 1921			August 28, 2010		Suspended operations indefinitely. MRO still operational. Brand was revived during 2023.
Deruluft	(Weimar Republic) / (Nazi Germany) / (Russian Soviet Federative Socialist Republic)	November 24, 1921			March 31, 1937		Joint German-Soviet airline.
West Australian Airways	(Australia)	December 5, 1921			June 12, 1936		Became part of Australian National Airways.
Aeromarine West Indies Airways	(United States)	1921			1924		Services started 1 November 1920; first U.S. international air service
Junkers Luftverkehr	(Weimar Republic)	1921			1926		A division of the aircraft manufacturer Junkers; became a separate company in 1924; merged into Deutsche Luft Hansa in 1926; joint-ventures with airlines in Austria, Denmark, Estonia, Finland, Hungary, Latvia, Norway, Poland, Sweden, Switzerland
Beijing-Han Airlines	(China)	March 29, 1922			March 31, 1922		Founded by warlord Cao Kun with a single Handley Page aircraft, likely a modified HP O/400; fatally crashed in Beijing 3 days later.
Aerolloyd	(Poland)	June 3, 1922			December 28, 1929		Name changed to Aerolot in 1925; merged with other privately owned airlines in Poland formed LOT Polish Airlines.
Latvijas gaisa satiksme AS	(Latvia)	July 31, 1922			1928		Operated in 1923-1926. With hub in Spilve airport, Riga it served Tallinn-Riga-Kaunas (for some time-Klaipėda)-Koenigsberg route in cooperation with Junkers Luftverkehr AG and Aeronaut. Went bankrupt in 1926, liquidated in 1928.
Malert	(Hungary)	November 19, 1922			1944		Fore-runner of Malev Hungarian Airlines.
Air Union	(French Third Republic)	January 1, 1923			October 7, 1933	Air France	Merged with four other airlines to form Air France.
Dobrolyot	(Soviet Union) / (Russia)	February 3, 1923				Aeroflot	Founded as Dobrolyot, name changed to Aeroflot in 1932. The company has undergone significant changes in its corporate structure since its foundation.
SABENA	(Belgium)	May 23, 1923			February 2002		Succeeded by SN Brussels Airlines, which became Brussels Airlines. MRO still operational.
British Marine Air Navigation Co Ltd	(United Kingdom)	August 1923			March 31, 1924		Merged with three other airlines to form Imperial Airways.
Czech Airlines	(First Czechoslovak Republic) / (Czech Republic)	October 6, 1923			October 26, 2024		Founded as Czechoslovak State Airlines, name changed to Czech Airlines in 1995.
Aero	(Finland)	November 1, 1923				Finnair	Founded as Aero O/Y, name changed to Finnair in 1968.
Florida Airways	(United States)	1923			1927		
Ukrpovitroshliakh	(Soviet Union)	June 1, 1923			1929	Aeroflot	Merged into Dobrolyot.
Zakavia	(Soviet Union)	May 10, 1923			1925	Aeroflot	Merged into Ukrvozdukhput.
Condor Syndikat	(Weimar Republic) / (Brazil)	May 5, 1924			July 1, 1927		German-based Brazilian airline; absorbed into Deutsche Luft Hansa
AB Aerotransport	(Sweden)	June 2, 1924			October 1, 1950		Formed SAS.
Tajikistan division of Aeroflot	(Soviet Union) / (Tajikistan)	September 3, 1924				Tajik Air	Founded as a division of Aeroflot in Tajik ASSR, became independent in 1991.
Imperial Airways	(United Kingdom)	March 31, 1924			November 24, 1939	British Airways	Amalgamated to form British Overseas Airways Corporation - itself merged to found British Airways.
Slov-Air	(First Czechoslovak Republic) / (Slovakia)	1924			2001		Founded as a department of Bata Shoes; name changed to Svitlet in 1948, to Agrolet in 1950 (became part of CSA, became independent in 1955), and to Slov-Air in 1969.
Aero	(Poland)	February 1925			December 28, 1929		Merged with Aerolot, formed LOT Polish Airlines.
Ryan Airline Company	(United States)	April 19, 1925			1926		Name changed to B. F. Mahoney Aircraft Corporation.
National Air Transport	(United States)	May 21, 1925	May 12, 1926	December 1930	1934	United Airlines	Purchased by United Aircraft and Transport Corporation (UATC) in 1930. Became part of the newly formed United Air Lines in 1931, which became a separate company following the Air Mail scandal in 1933 and the Air Mail Act of 1934.
Western Air Express	(United States)	July, 1925	April 17, 1926		April 1, 1987	Delta Air Lines	Commenced operations April 17, 1926; merged with Transcontinental Air Transport to form Transcontinental & Western Air in 1930; severed from T & WA again in 1934; named changed to General Air Lines and back to Western Air Express in 1934, and to Western Airlines in 1941; merged with Delta Air Lines in 1987. Los Angeles-San Diego Air Line started service in 1925 with Ryan modified Davis-Douglas Cloudster.
Lloyd Aéreo Boliviano	(Bolivia)	September 15, 1925			2010		Former flag carrier of Bolivia; replaced by Boliviana de Aviación.
Unión Aérea Española	(Spain)	1925			1929		Merged with Concesionaria de Líneas Aéreas Subvencionadas (CLASSA) following Wall Street Crash of 1929.
Ford Air Transport Service	(United States)	1925			1932		The world's first regularly scheduled commercial cargo airline.
Società Anonima Navigazione Aerea	(Kingdom of Italy)	1925			1934		Merged with three other airlines to form Ala Littoria.
Stout Air Services	(United States)	1925	1926	1926	September 12, 1930	United Airlines	Purchased by National Air Transport (NAT) in 1930.
Pacific Air Transport	(United States)	January 1926	15 September 1926	15 September 1926	December 17, 1928	United Airlines	Merged into Boeing Air Transport, but continued to operate as a separate division until 1934.
Deutsche Luft Hansa	(Weimar Republic) / (Nazi Germany)	January 6, 1926			April 22, 1945		Name styles as Deutsche Lufthansa from 1933. Operations suspended following the German defeat in World War II. There is no legal connection to Lufthansa, which was founded in 1953.
Western Canadian Airways	(Canada)	March 1926			1930		Amalgamated with several Eastern Canadian carriers forming Canadian Airways.
Varney Air Lines	(United States)		April 6, 1926		May 1934	United Airlines	Began airmail service on April 6, 1926. Merged with three other airlines to form United Air Lines in 1931. In 1934 Varney Speed Lines was established becoming Continental Airlines in 1936 when Robert Six took over control.
Eastern Air Lines	(United States)	April 19, 1926			January 17, 1991		Started Operations in 1926 as Pitcairn Aviation. Until 1930 changed to "Eastern Air Transport" then Eastern Air Lines until 1991. Re-established in 2015 until 2017. Brand relaunched again in 2018.
Northwest Airlines	(United States)	September 10, 1926	October 1, 1926	1927	January 31, 2010	Delta Air Lines	Began flying mail for the U.S. Post Office Department, first carried passengers in 1927. Merged with Delta Air Lines in 2010.
Colonial Air Transport	(United States)	1926	July 26, 1926		1930	American Airlines	Formed American Airlines.
Pan American World Airways	(United States)	March 14, 1927			December 4, 1991		Founded by Juan T. Trippe and began operations in 1927 as Pan American Airways (PAA). Former de facto flag carrier of United States. Bankrupted in 1991 due to: high fuel prices because of the first Gulf War and 1973 oil crisis; a series of hijackings; no US network until the 1980s; the Lockerbie bombing of flight 103.
Varig	(Brazil)	May 7, 1927			July 20, 2006		New airline formed with the same name in 2006 and eventually sold to Gol Transportes Aéreos.
Aeroput	(Kingdom of Yugoslavia) / (Socialist Federal Republic of Yugoslavia) / (Serbia and Montenegro) / (Serbia)	June 17, 1927			24 December 1948	Air Serbia	Formed as Aeroput in 1927, then re-formed as JAT - Jugoslovenski aerotransport in 1947, rebranded as Jat Airways in 2003, and then as Air Serbia in 2013.
Iberia	(Spain)	June 28, 1927				Iberia	Merged with British Airways to form International Airlines Group (IAG) in January 2011 and remains in operation as a subsidiary company.
Maddux Air Lines	(United States)	September 22, 1927			November 16, 1929		Merged with TAT to form TAT-Maddux Air Lines, itself merged to form T & WA.
Scenic Airways	(United States)	October 3, 1927				Grand Canyon Airlines	Founded as Scenic Airways; name changed to Grand Canyon Airlines in 1930.
Bunavad	(Tsardom of Bulgaria (1908–1946))	October 25, 1927			1930		First national airline of Bulgaria.
Cruzeiro do Sul	(Brazil)	December 1, 1927			January 1, 1993		Founded as Syndicato Condor; name changed to Cruzeiro do Sul in 1943; merged with Varig in 1993.
Standard Air Lines	(United States)	1927			March 1930		Sold off to Western Air Express, itself merged to form T & WA.
National Parks Airways	(United States)	1927			1937		Bought out by Western Air Express.
Wien Air Alaska	(United States)	1927			November 23, 1984		First airline in Alaska.
MacRobertson Miller Airlines	(Australia)	1927			1993		Absorbed into Ansett.
Paul R. Braniff, Inc.	(United States)	May 29, 1928			March 1929		First Braniff brothers airline entity that operated scheduled service between Oklahoma City and Tulsa, Oklahoma. Forerunner of Braniff Airways and then became Braniff Air Lines, Inc., and later Braniff Airways, Inc. in November 1930.
KNILM	(Dutch East Indies) / (Indonesia)	July 16, 1928			August 1, 1947		First operated as KNILM. KNILM dissolved and transferred to KLM Interinsulair Bedrijf (today Garuda Indonesia)
Universal Air Lines	(United States)	July 30, 1928			1934	American Airlines	Merged with other companies to form American Airlines.
ETA	(Brazil)	August 10, 1928			November 16, 1929		Ceased operations due to administrative difficulties.
British Columbia Airways	(Canada)	August 16, 1928			August 25, 1928		Had a single Ford 4-AT Trimotor which crashed.
Faucett Perú	(Peru)	September 15, 1928			December 3, 1997		
Japan Air Transport	(Empire of Japan)	October 28, 1928			1938		Merged into Imperial Japanese Airways.
Delta Air Service	(United States)	December 3, 1928		June 17, 1929	October, 1930	Delta Air Lines	Founded as an aircraft manufacture, Ogdensburg Aeroway Corp, in 1920, became Huff Daland Dusters for crop dusting in 1925 (not an airline). Acquired and became an airline, 'Delta Air Service' in 1928. Passenger operations began on June 17, 1929, and continued until October 1930. Restarted as Delta Air Lines in 1934.
Polskie Linie Lotnicze LOT	(Poland)	December 29, 1928				LOT Polish Airlines	Polskie Linie Lotnicze LOT created by the Polish government; they have since absorbed airlines Aerolot (1922) and Aero (1925).
Mid-Continent Airlines	(United States)	1928			August 26, 1952		Founded as Hanford's Tri-State Airlines; name changed to Mid-Continent Airlines in 1938; merged into Braniff International Airways in 1952.
Transcontinental Air Transport	(United States)	1928			1930	American Airlines	Merged with Western Air Express to form Transcontinental & Western Air (T & WA) in 1930; renamed Trans World Airlines (TWA) in 1950; merged into American Airlines in 2001.
Inter-Island Airways	(United States)	January 30, 1929				Hawaiian Airlines	Incorporated January 30, 1929 as Inter-Island Airways. Began service October 6, 1929. Name changed to Hawaiian Airlines October 1, 1941. Merged with Alaska Airlines on September 18, 2024, Hawaiian Airlines still operates as a subsidiary of Alaska Air Group.
Línea Aeropostal Santiago-Arica	(Chile)	March 5, 1929				LATAM Chile	Began as Línea Aeropostal Santiago-Arica. It took the name Línea Aérea Nacional de Chile (LAN Chile) in 1932. In September 1989, the Chilean government privatized the carrier. LAN Chile became LAN Airlines in 2004 but in 2010, LAN merged with TAM Airlines and became LATAM Airlines. LAN Airlines still operates under the name LATAM Chile as a subsidiary of LATAM Airlines Group.
CLASSA – Concesionaria de Líneas Aéreas Subvencionadas	(Spain)	May 13, 1929			July 18, 1936		Ceased operations due to the Spanish Civil War.
Linea Aeropostal Venezolana	(Venezuela)	July 3, 1929			August 1994	Aeropostal Alas de Venezuela	Founded as Linea Aeropostal Venezolana LAV. Name changed to Aeropostal Alas de Venezuela in 1997 after privatization.
Pan American-Grace Airways	(United States)	September 13, 1929			February 1, 1969		Joint venture between Pan American Airways and W.R. Grace (Note: W.R. Grace owned Grace Shipping Company, the largest shipping company in South America); merged into Braniff in 1969.
Cubana de Aviación	(Cuba)	October 8, 1929				Cubana de Aviación	
Panair do Brasil	(Brazil)	October 22, 1929			February 16, 1965		Founded as Nyrba do Brasil. Name changed to Panair do Brasil in 1930. Bankruptcy forced by the Brazilian Militar Dictatorship Government.
Wiggins Airways	(United States)	1929			June 1, 2024		Purchased by Ameriflight in 2014, it was formally made a division of Ameriflight on June 1 2024.
Union Airways	(Union of South Africa)	July 24, 1929			January 31, 1934		First South African airline; taken over by the government and renamed South African Airways.
Australian National Airways	(Australia)	1929			1931		
Trans World Airlines	(United States)	July 16, 1930			December 1, 2001	American Airlines	Acquired by American Airlines.
China National Aviation Corporation	(Republic of China (1912–1949)) / (China)	August 1, 1930			July 17, 1952	Air China	Merged with CATC to form CAAC Airlines.
Aviaarktika	(Soviet Union)	September 1, 1930			January 3, 1960	Aeroflot	Absorbed into Aeroflot.
Braniff International Airways	(United States)	November 13, 1930			May 12/May 13, 1982		
New England & Western Air Transportation Co.	(United States)	1930			1930		
South West African Airways	(South West Africa)	1930			1935		First commercial air service in South West Africa (Namibia)
American Airlines	(United States)	1930		June 25, 1936			Formed as a union of 82 small airlines

For airlines founded after 1930 see Category: Airlines by year of establishment
