= Sablatnig P.III =

P.III
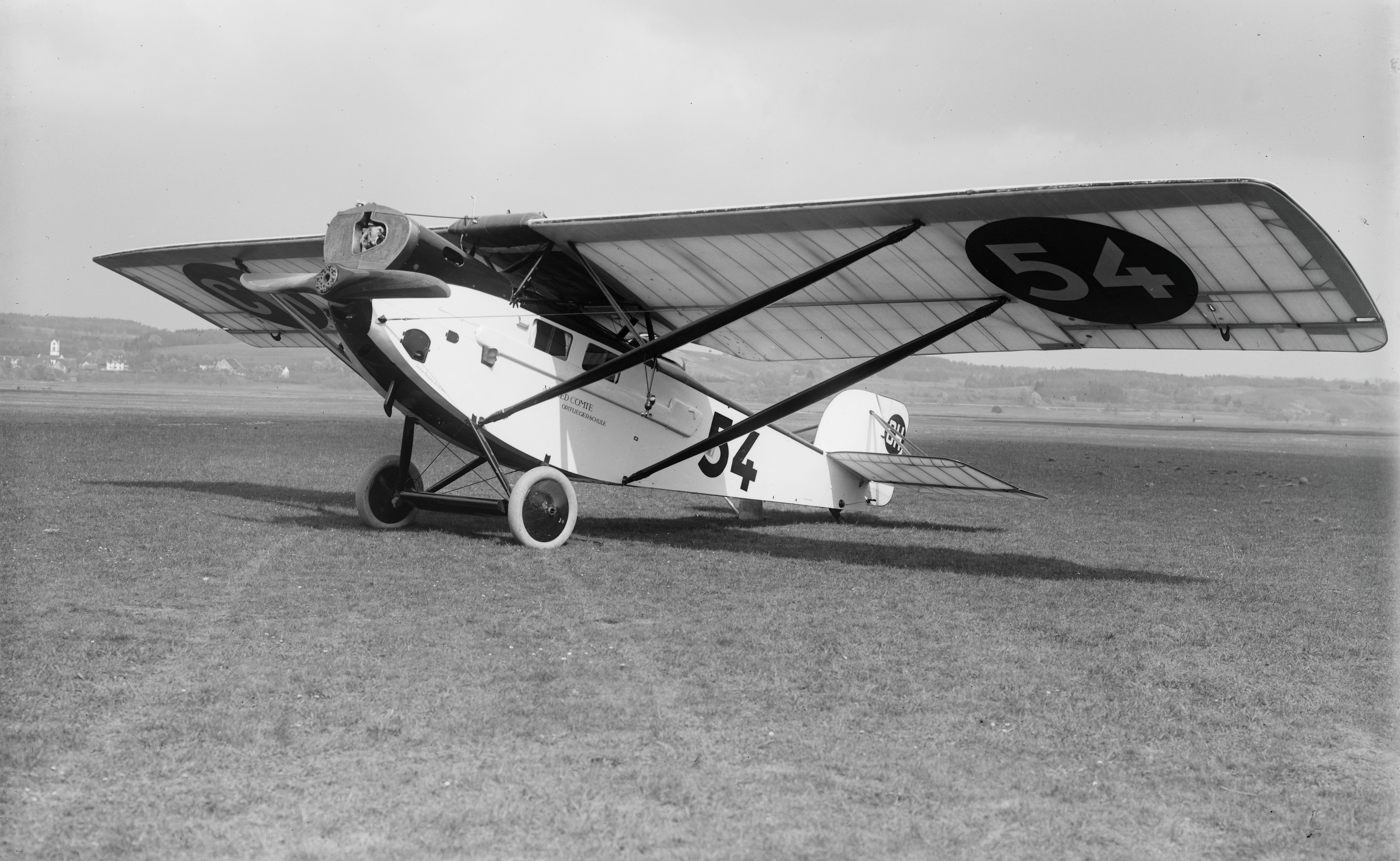
- Sablatnig P.III 'CH-54' of Alfred Comte's flying school at Dübendorf airfield near Zürich.

General information
- Type: Airliner
- National origin: Germany
- Manufacturer: Sablatnig
- Designer: Dr. Ing. Hans Seehase
- Number built: 30–40

History
- Introduction date: 1921
- First flight: 1919
- Retired: around 1930

The Sablatnig P.III was an airliner produced in Germany in the early 1920s.

== Development ==
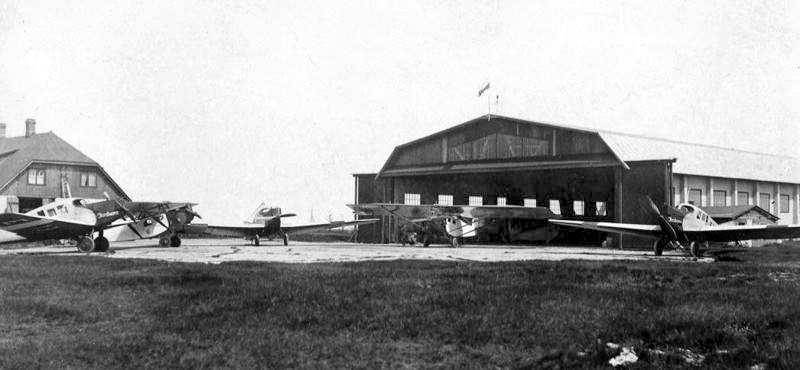
Two P.III aircraft parked with Junkers F.13s at Lasnamäe Airfield, Estonia in 1925.

A contemporary account identifies the P.III as Germany's first aircraft purposefully-designed as a commercial passenger plane. It was a high-wing, strut-braced monoplane of conventional design powered by a single engine in the nose (either a 200-hp Benz, or a 260-hp Maybach). Later the British 258-hp Armstrong Siddeley Puma engine was the usual power plant. The crew of two, a pilot and a navigator or mechanic, were accommodated in separate open cockpits in tandem. These were behind the enclosed six seat passenger cabin in the center of the fuselage. Passengers entered the cabin through a door directly from the ground, rather than having to climb over the side of the aircraft, or up a ladder. The P.III's cabin offered passengers the comfort of an expensive automobile. The structure was of wood throughout, with the fuselage skinned in plywood. The wings and horizontal stabiliser folded for storage or rail transport, and indeed, P.IIIs carried their own tent as a portable hangar.

== Operational history ==
This aircraft was one of the few approved as a civilian, not military type by the ILÜK (Interallierte Luftfahrt-Überwachungs-Kommission, Inter-allied Aviation Control Commission) for production in Germany after World War I. However under the Treaty of Versailles all aircraft production was forbidden in Germany for a period of six months during the year 1920, and all existing aircraft, both military and civilian, and including aircraft built after the end of World War I, had to be either handed over to the Allied military or destroyed. As a result, Sablatnig ceased building aircraft. Apparently the existing P.IIIs were either hidden or smuggled out of Germany.

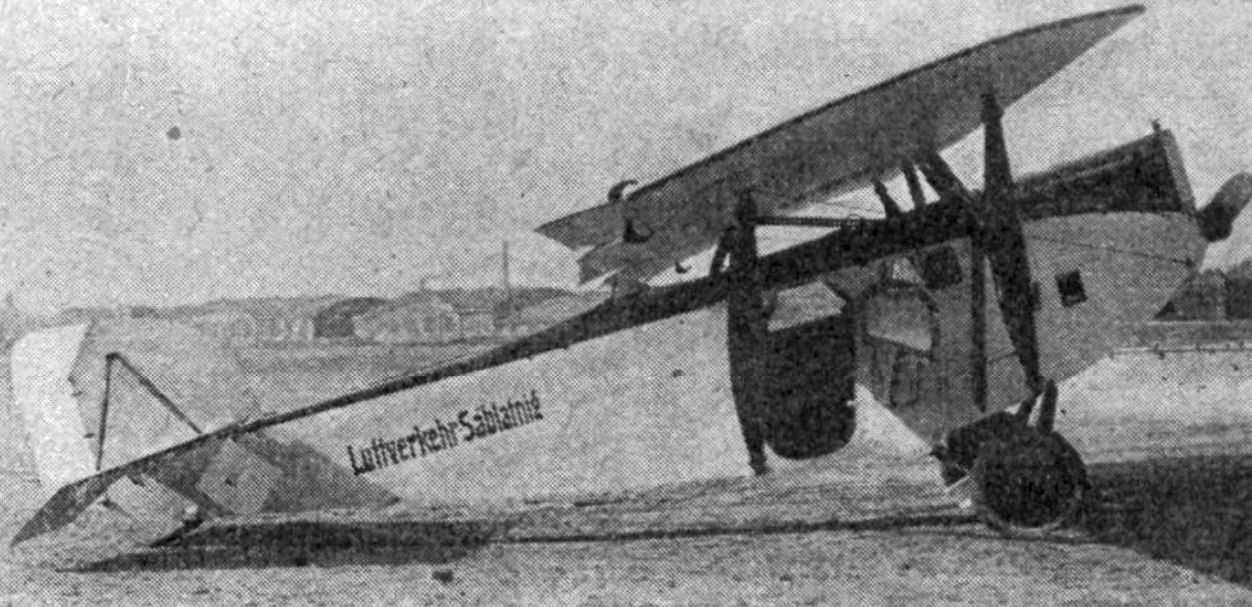
A Sablatnig P.III illustrated in L'Aerophile January,1921

17 Sablatnig P.IIIs were registered in Germany in and after 1921. Fritz Sablatnig, the owner of the Sablatnig company, estimated total production at 30 to 40 examples, including 12 made in Estonia by Dwigatel. The P.III entered service with a number of airlines in Germany and other countries, including Lloyd Luftverkehr Sablatnig, Deutsche Luft Hansa, Danish Air Express, Aeronaut, as well as with the Swiss Air Force.

== Operators ==
Denmark

- Danish Air Express

Estonia

- Aeronaut

Germany

- Deutsche Luft-Reederei
- Deutscher Aero-Lloyd
- Deutsche Luft Hansa
- Lloyd Luftverkehr Sablatnig

Switzerland

- Swiss Air Force

== Specifications ==
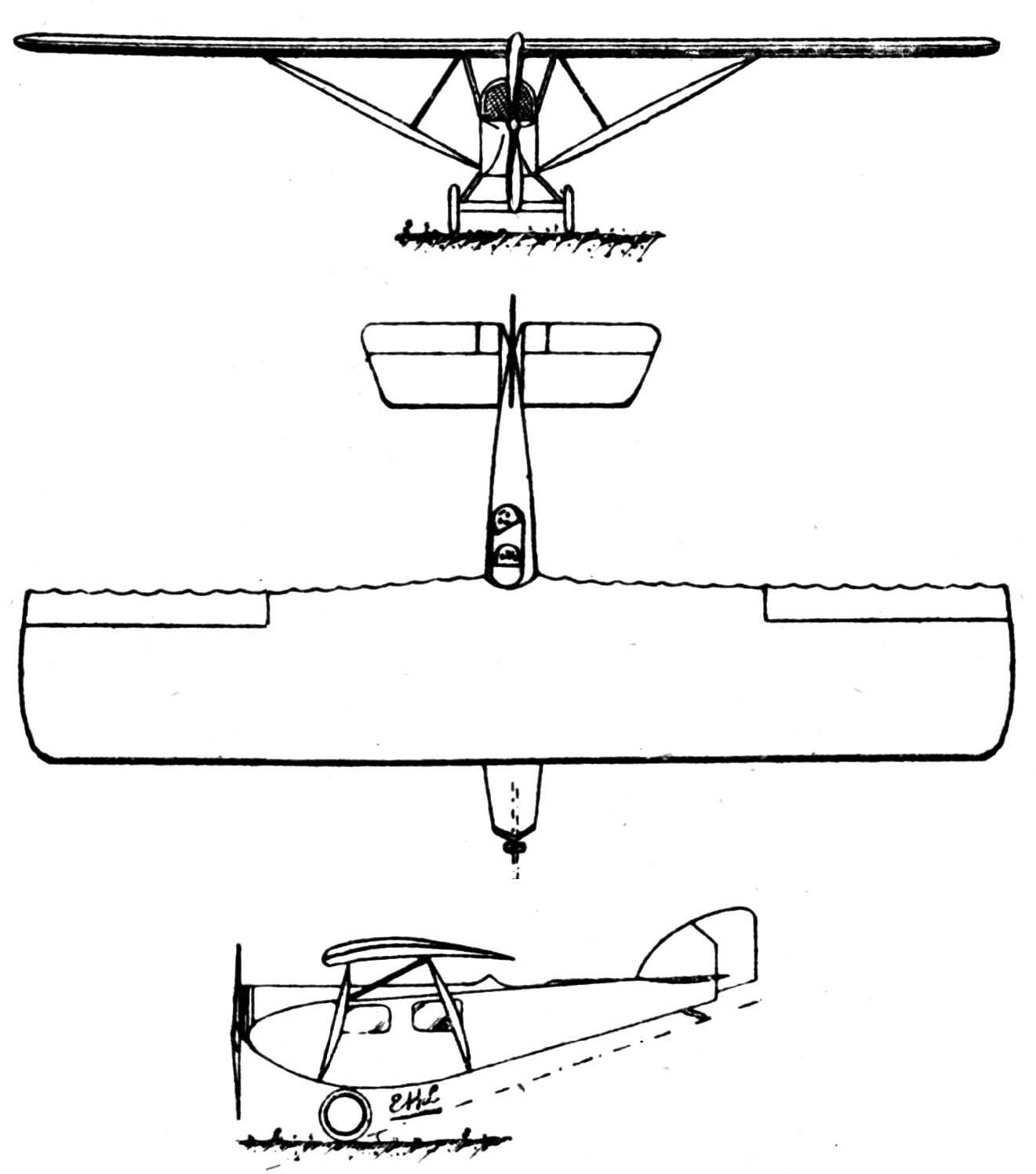
Sablatnig P.III 3-view drawing from L'Aerophile January,1921

Data from The Sablatnig P.3 Monoplane

General characteristics

- Crew: 2
- Capacity: 6 pax
- Length: 8.94 m (29 ft 4 in)
- Wingspan: 16 m (52 ft 6 in)
- Height: 3.25 m (10 ft 8 in)
- Wing area: 45.1 m^{2} (485 sq ft)
- Empty weight: 1,400 kg (3,086 lb)
- Gross weight: 3,080 kg (6,790 lb)
- Powerplant: 1 × Maybach Mb.IVa 6-cylinder water-cooled in-line piston engine, 190 kW (260 hp)

Alternative engines:-

192 kW (258 hp) Armstrong Siddeley Puma
172 kW (230 hp) Benz Bz.IVa

- Propellers: 2-bladed fixed-pitch propeller

Performance

- Maximum speed: 170 km/h (110 mph, 92 kn)
- Cruise speed: 150 km/h (93 mph, 81 kn)
- Stall speed: 80 km/h (50 mph, 43 kn)
- Range: 900 km (560 mi, 490 nmi)
- Endurance: 6 hours
- Service ceiling: 3,800 m (12,500 ft)
- Rate of climb: 2 m/s (390 ft/min)

== See also ==
Aircraft of comparable role, configuration, and era

- Fokker F.II
- Junkers F.13

== Bibliography ==
- Gerdessen, Frederik. "Estonian Air Power 1918 – 1945". Air Enthusiast, No. 18, April – July 1982. pp. 61–76. ISSN 0143-5450.
