= Aeronaut (company) =

Estonian airline

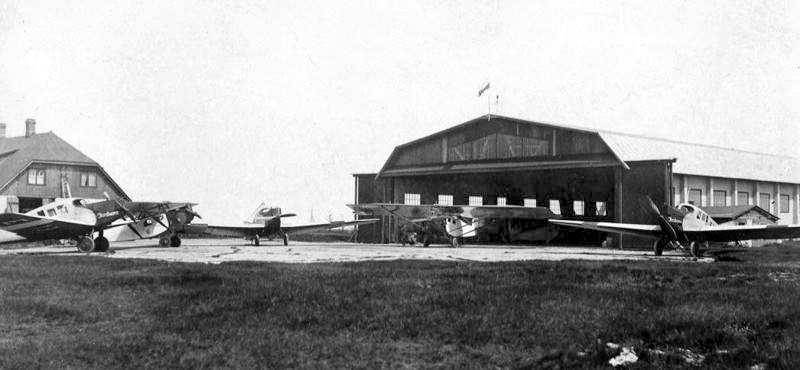
Aeronaut hangar at Lasnamäe Airfield (1925)

Aeronaut (Estonian: Eesti Õhusõidu Aktsiaselts Aeronaut) was an Estonian airline which existed between 1921 and 1928. It was the first Estonian airline.

The company operated the following routes: Tallinn–Helsinki, Tallinn–Stockholm, Tallinn–Riga–Königsberg and Tallinn–Tartu–Viljandi–Pärnu.

== History ==
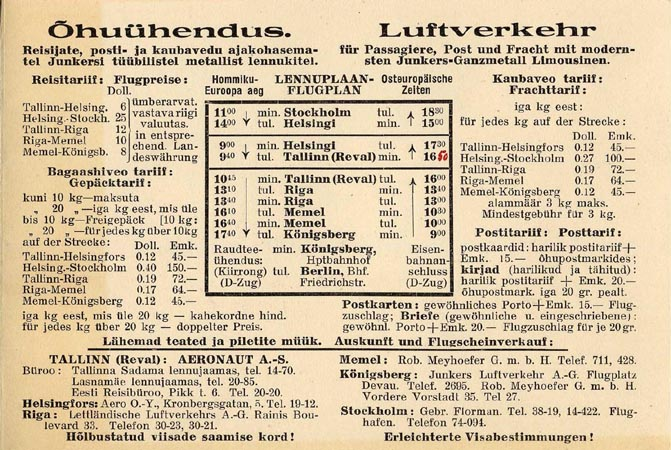
Aeronaut 1925 timetable

The company's first plane was a Sablatnig P.III. Later, Sablatnig planes were replaced by Junkers F13.

In the second half of May 1924, Aeronaut extended the Tallinn-Riga line via Memel to Königsberg. There was one flight per day, which lasted 7 hours and 15 minutes with layovers.

On January 24, 1926, an Aeronaut plane crashed in Tallinn. Jakob Tillo, a founding member of the company, died.

On April 11, 1927, Aeronaut closed due to troubled finances. Five days later, the entire staff was fired, and at the beginning of April of the following year, Aeronaut was liquidated.

On September 12, 1929, the last assets of the joint-stock company were sold at auction. Two aircraft without engines were sold for 3.50 kroons.

On September 20, 2021, a stamp dedicated to the 100th anniversary of Estonian civil aviation was released. The stamp depicts a Sablatnig P III aircraft.
