= Latvijas Gaisa Satiksmes Akciju Sabiedriba =

Latvian-German airline, 1922–1928

Latvijas Gaisa Satiksmes Akciju Sabiedrība was a Latvian-German airline, based in Riga, Latvia. It operated international air lines from Riga Spilve airport (ICAO: EVRS). The airline was launched in 1922. It was finally dissolved in 1928 after major shareholders pulled out support.

== Establishment ==
The airline, under the name of Latvijas Gaisa Satiksmes Akziju Sabiedriba, was founded on July 31, 1922. It had a capital of 100,000 (Lats) Gold francs, divided into 5,000 shares each 20 (Lats) Gold francs.

The foundation of the Latvijas Gaisa Satiksmes AS was supported by the Junkers Flugzeugwerk AG from Dessau, eager to find ways to avoid destruction of its fleet of Junkers F 13 and increase its sales of Junkers-aircraft. Junkers was also eager to exploit the German postal authorities’ concession for the transportation of freight and passengers on the link Berlin – Königsberg – Kaunas (or Klaipėda / Mėmel) – Riga, granted in December 1920.

The founders of Latvijas Gaisa Satiksmes AS were two Latvian citizens Captain Jānis Lindbergs and Lieutenant Jānis Ozols, together with Dr Alexander Woskressenski, a Russian lawyer living in Riga and serving as general agent for Lloyd-Junkers Luftverkehrs GmbH for Latvia and Estonia.

The company received a special concession from the Latvian Government for flying international services. Besides being an airline company, Latvijas Gaisa Satiksmes AS was to act as an agent, planned the purchase of workshops for aircraft maintenance and the building of maintenance facilities at airports.

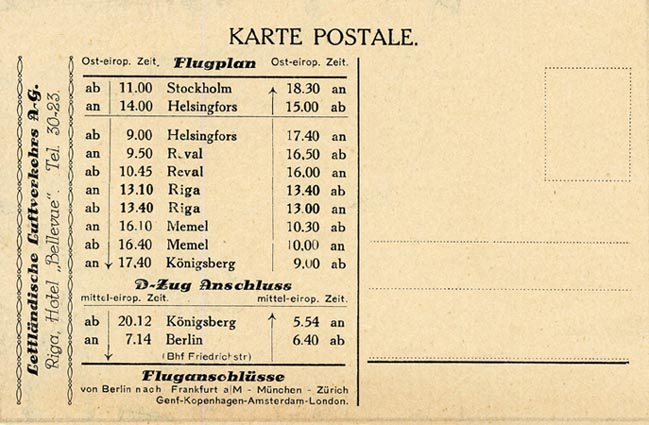
1925 flight schedule of Junkers Luftverkehrs AG and its affiliates Latvijas Gaisa Satiksmes AS (Latvia) and Aeronaut (Estonia). Courtesy of Björn Larsson and David Zekria collection.

Article 17 of the company's charter included the possibility for the company to use its shares for the purchase of aircraft. This was done to give Junkers Flugzeugwerk AG the possibility to deliver aircraft to the company.

On August 2, 1922, 2,000 shares were transferred to Junkers Werke AG, Dessau and 2,760 shares were transferred to the Junkers-affiliated Danziger Luftpost GmbH from Danzig in exchange for two Junkers F.13 aircraft.

Junkers Werke AG's share remained the same throughout the company's existence, but through so-called Treuhändervertrag (straw men agreements) it owned 100% of the company.

In exchange Latvijas Gaisa Satiksmes AS received one silver-coloured Junkers F.13, named Condor (registration No. D-202), from Junkers Flugzeugwerk AG and another Fasan (registration No. D-215) from Danziger Luftpost GmbH. Initially they flew with German registrations until were registered in Latvia respectively as BL-ATA (September 1923) and BL-ATB (March 1924).

== Operational history ==
In the spring of 1923, the Latvijas Gaisa Satiksmes AS joined the Osteuropa Union of Junkers-affiliated airline companies to fly (as from March 7, 1923) on the Tallinn – Riga – Kaunas – Königsberg line. This line also served Klaipėda.

On this line the Latvijas Gaisa Satiksmes AS and other Osteuropa Union-members between May and October 1923 flew 107,896 km and transported 1,061 passengers, 7,041 kg of freight and 581 kg of mail. Of the 284 flights planned, 257 were carried out (= 90% regularity).

This line was served also in 1924 and 1925, during the months of May to October.

While participating Osteuropa Union air service in 1923–1925, Latvijas Gaisa Satiksmes AS flew 603,000 kilometres, carried 5,627 passengers and 84,007 kg. of freight.

On May 7, the Latvijas Gaisa Satiksmes AS joined the founders of the Europa Union KGA in Berlin, but when Europa Union KGA decided to increase its capital stock (September 1925), the Latvian Government withdrew its subsidies for the airline. As a result, the company had to pull out of the co-operation and had subsequently to cease operations under Europa Union KGA's jurisdiction.

== Expansion plans and closure ==
In May 1925 Dr. Woskressenski asked Junkers’ director Dr Kaumann to investigate the possibilities of supplying Latvijas Gaisa Satiksmes AS with one Junkers F 13W and two Junkers G 24. This plan was later abandoned.

The airline was not profitable. Only in the year 1924 it recorded a small profit of Latvian Lats 104.35. Out of total revenue of Lats 366,319.95, the sales of airlines tickets produced a revenue of only Lats 42,328.86. The rest came from owners and Latvian Government subsidies. The Junkers Werke AG decided to close down the airline in summer of 1926, after Latvian Government withdrew its subsidies in 1925.

Subsequently, both Junkers F 13s were sold in June and July 1926 and eventually got back their German registrations and names.

The company was finally dissolved by November 1928.

== Fleet ==
Latvijas Gaisa Satiksme operated three single-engine Junkers F-13 aircraft, however, it never operated more than two at any given time. They were registered as BL-ATA and BL-ATB.

BL-ATA
(formerly D-202 Condor) provided by Junkers Flugzeugwerk AG.
BL-ATB
(formerly D-215 Fasan) provided by Danziger Luftpost. Crashed October 15, 1924, and subsequently destroyed by fire.
BL-ATB
(formerly D-251 Eule). Received in April 1925 as replacement for first BL-ATB.

== Accident and incidents ==
On October 15, 1924, Junkers F.13, BL-ATB crashed. No accounts of victims were recorded. The aircraft was subsequently destroyed by fire during the repair works in Königsberg.

On March 10, 1926, the Junkers F 13 BL-ATA, leased by Aero O/y, crashed near Helsinki in heavy fog. It may have been carrying a delegation of Latvian Air Force, which had just visited Finland. Others claim that it had just one passenger on board. No accounts of victims were recorded. On April 19, 1926, the aircraft was shipped to Königsberg for repairs.

== Destinations served ==
The airline served following destinations:

- Kaunas (Aleksotas / S. Darius and S. Girėnas airport)
- Klaipėda (Rumpiškės)
- Königsberg (Devau airport)
- Riga (Spilve airport)
- Tallinn (Lasnamäe Airfield)

== Cited sources ==
1. 10 Marz 1926, https://www.junkers.de/blog/bruch-und-wiederaufbau-einer-junkers-f-13/
2. Junkers F13 Production List - the Hugo Junkers Homepage, http://hugojunkers.bplaced.net/junkers-f13-production-list.html
3. Lettlaendische Luftverkehrs AG / Latvijas Gaisa Satikimes A/S, Riga, http://hugojunkers.bplaced.net/lettlaendische-luftverkehrs-ag.html
4. Latvijas Gaisa Satiksmes Akciju Sabiedríba (1922–1928), https://www.europeanairlines.no/latvijas-gaisa-satiksmes-akciju-sabiedriba-1922-1928/
