= Aerotarg =

1921 Polish airline

Poznań Airline Society Aerotarg
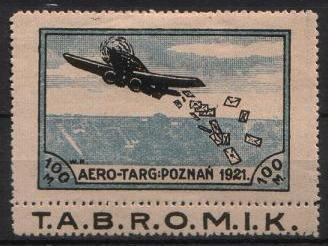
- Aero-Targ air mail stamp
- Founded: May 10, 1921
- Ceased operations: June 16, 1921
- Hubs: Poznań
- Focus cities: Warsaw, Free City of Danzig
- Destinations: 2
- Headquarters: Poznań

Poznań Airline Society Aerotarg (also spelt Aero-Targ) was the first Polish airline. It was founded in Poznań on 10 May 1921 mainly in order to serve participants and visitors of the first Poznań International Fair. Aerotarg operated the first regular air connection in Poland - the Poznań-Warsaw route, as well as the international connection between Poznań and the Free City of Danzig (Gdańsk).

It is considered to be a precursor of the Polish flag carrier LOT Polish Airlines along with other private-owned companies which were merged into the latter in December 1928.

== History ==
The organizing committee of the first Poznań Fair (which was later renamed Poznań International Fair) decided to set up an air connection between Poznań, Warsaw and the free city of Danzig (Gdańsk) to enable a rapid transit of the participants to Poznań. To do so, on 10 May 1921 the Poznań Airline Society Aerotarg was established. The committee allocated Mp.5 million to finance this venture. Aerotarg began cooperation with a haulage company from Danzig - Danziger Luftpost which subsequently leased six Junkers F 13 aircraft to the newly created airline.

The airline operated its first flight on 29 May, on the day after the opening of the fair, and ceased operation on 16 June. The Polish Post used the airline to send airmail and issued a special series of stamps to allow for it.

Altogether the airline carried out 58 flights on the Poznań-Warsaw route and 30 flights between Poznań and Danzig. Around 100 passengers and 3000 kg of parcels were transported. The venture turned out to be unprofitable and the 5 million marks of the seed capital were not returned to the organizers of the fair.
