= New England & Western Air Transportation Co. =

IATA	ICAO	Call sign
-	-	-
- Commenced operations: 1930; 95 years ago
- Ceased operations: 1930; 95 years ago
- Operating bases: Springfield, Massachusetts
- Headquarters: Springfield, Massachusetts, United States

The New England & Western Air Transportation Co. was an airline based in Springfield, Massachusetts that existed for a short period in 1930. It served passengers, but was based on US airmail contract until US government limited who could carry US mail.

== See also ==
- List of defunct airlines of the United States
