= Bunavad =

First national airline of Bulgaria

- Commenced operations: 25 October 1927
- Ceased operations: 1930
- Operating bases: Sofia Bozhurishte Airport
- Fleet size: See Fleet below
- Destinations: See Routes below
- Headquarters: Sofia, Bulgaria
- Key people: Dimitar Tochkov (Director)

Bunavad (Bulgarian: Бунавадъ; Българско народно въздухоплавателно акционерно дружество, romanized: Bunavadŭ; Bŭlgarsko narodno vŭzdukhoplavatelno aktsionerno druzhestvo, lit. 'Bunavad: Bulgarian National Aviation Joint Stock Company') was the first national airline of Bulgaria. The airline was conceived in late 1926, operated scheduled services between major Bulgarian cities from October 1927 and closed in 1930.

Bunavad's post-War successors were the Bulgarian Ministry of Transport and Communications' Air Communications Administration (the DVS) which operated under the acronym BVS (Bulgarian: БВС, Български въздушни съобщения) and which in time developed into TABSO and its successors.

== History ==
In 1926 the Bulgarian government contracted with the German Junkers aircraft manufacturing company to assist in the formation of an airline and equipping it with Junkers airliners. The agreement provided for the state to facilitate certain loans towards the purchase of airliners and to disburse certain funds towards the opening of air services. It was formally signed on 22 November 1926.

During 1927 private Bulgarian business interests led by Dr Dimitar Tochkov as Director formed the Bunavad airline. Bunavad ordered two examples of the then-popular Junkers F.13 for delivery later that year. From the outset, Bunavad offered both passenger and mail/freight services. Bulgaria's first airmail postage stamps duly appeared on sale on 7 November 1927.

An inauguration ceremony for the airline and its first scheduled air service, between Sofia, Ruse, and Varna, was held at Sofia Bozhurishte Airport on 25 October 1927. The Bulgarian government was represented by Reserve Lieutenant Colonel Kimon Georgiev, until recently Minister of Railways and Posts, whose title had been restyled for the occasion to Minister of Railways, Posts, and Aeronautics. His German counterpart was renowned air pioneer Fritz Horn of the Junkers company, who had arrived in a Junkers G.23. Also present were the then-Mayor of Sofia Reserve General Vladimir Vazov, Sofia Metropolitan Bishop Stefan, Konstantsa, wife of then-Prime Minister Andrey Lyapchev, the press, and many members of the public.

Bunavad's two Junkers F.13s were christened at the ceremony, with Mrs Georgieva dedicating B-BUNA with the name Lastovitsa (Bulgarian: "Ластовица", meaning "Swallow") and Mrs Lyapcheva dedicating B-BUNB with the name Sokol (Bulgarian: "Соколъ", meaning "Falcon"). The aircraft then performed demonstration flights for the press and public, after which B-BUNA departed on the airline's first scheduled service. Its three passengers were met at Varna by Metropolitan Bishop Simeon and a large crowd of wellwishers.

After the Sofia-Ruse-Varna (and vice versa) service, Bunavad opened a service between Vidin, Ruse, and Varna and also between Sofia, Plovdiv, and Burgas (some sources claim Sofia-Burgas with no intermediate stop).

In late 1929, the Junkers company was forced to withdraw from the 1926 agreement due to the effects of the Great Depression. Bunavad continued operating amid drastically worsened business conditions until forced to wind-up on an unknown date in 1930. Being a defeated power in World War I, Bulgaria was largely stripped of the right to have its own aviation by the Treaty of Neuilly-sur-Seine. This, added to the paucity of intergovernmental arrangements, largely put paid to any international services that might have been conceived by Bunavad or putative other Bulgarian airlines.

== Infrastructure ==
Burgas was the only one of the cities served by Bunavad to have established a fully functioning international airport prior to the airline's formation. A modest passenger and mail terminal opened at Sofia's Bozhurishte Airport to serve Bunavad and others in 1927. The city of Varna also opened a facility in time for Bunavad's launch; it was subsequently moved to another site. All other terminal facilities were newly instituted for the new airline's operations.

Bunavad rented a headquarters at Sofia's central Bulevard Dondukov and had booking offices at two locations in central Sofia and in each serviced city. The airline rented hangarage facilities at Sofia's Bozhurishte Airfield, restyled Airport in honour of its formation.

== Routes ==
- Sofia – Ruse – Varna and vice versa
- Vidin – Ruse – Varna & v. v.
- Sofia – Plovdiv – Burgas & v. v.

== Fleet ==
All services were flown by Junkers F.13 aircraft.
