= Aero (Polish airline) =

Polish airline

The Society of Air Transportation Aero SA
- Founded: February 1925
- Ceased operations: December 28, 1928
- Hubs: Poznań
- Focus cities: Warsaw, Łódź
- Destinations: 2
- Headquarters: Poznań

The Society of Air Transportation Aero SA was a Polish airline founded in Poznań in 1925 by the members of the Association of Polish Pilots and based entirely on Polish seed capital. In December 28, 1928 it was merged with its main competitor Aerolot to form the newly founded Polish flag carrier LOT Polish Airlines.
