= Aerolot =

Polish airline

Polska Linia Lotnicza "Aerolot" SA
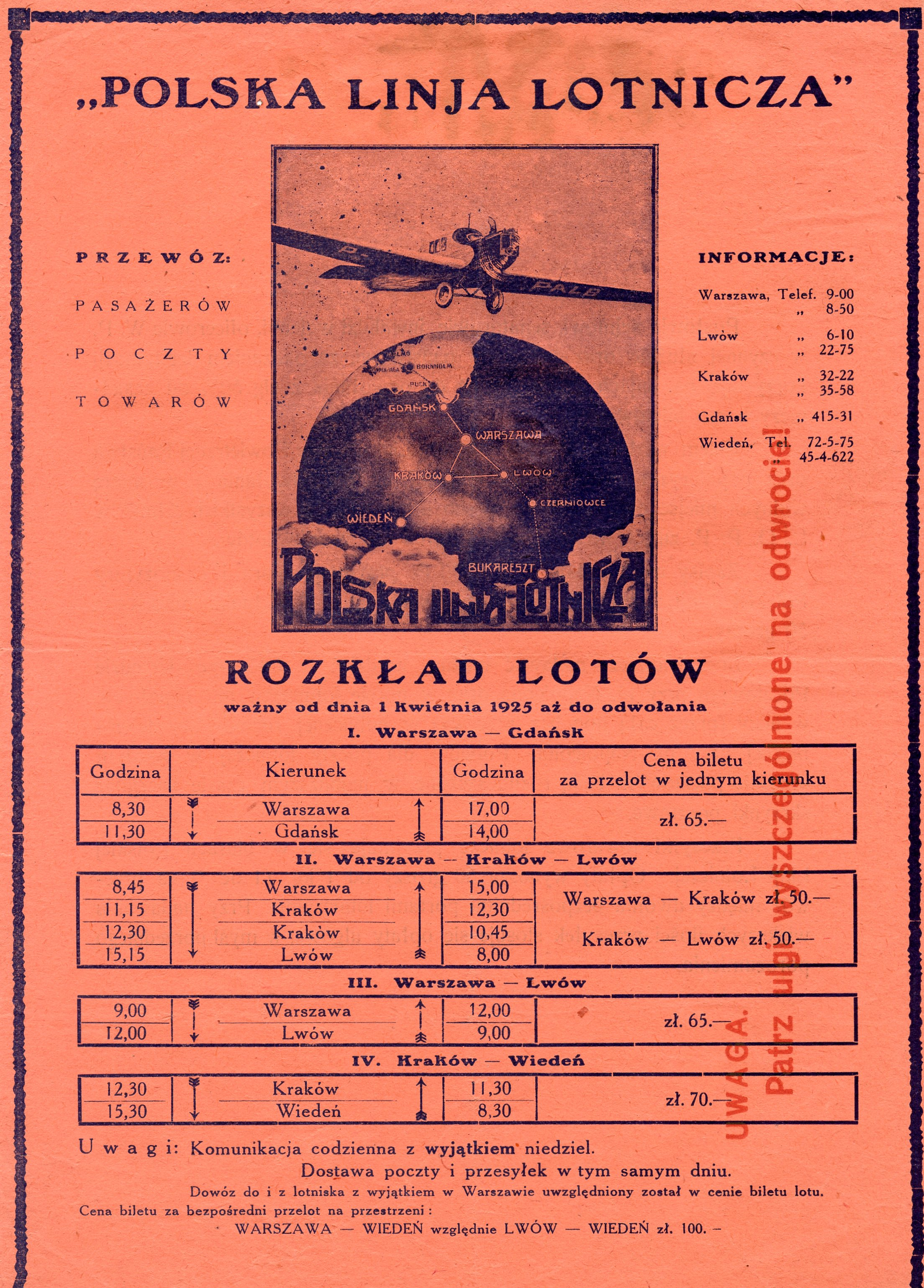
- The 1925 timetable used the name "Polska Linja Lotnicza" - Polish Airline, which later became part of the name of LOT Polish Airlines
- Founded: 3 June 1922; Danzig, Free City of Danzig
- Commenced operations: 5 September 1922
- Ceased operations: 28 December 1928
- Hubs: Danzig (now Gdańsk, Poland); Warsaw
- Focus cities: Kraków; Lwów (now Lviv, Ukraine); Warsaw
- Fleet size: 17

Aerolot (until 1925 Aerolloyd) was a Polish airline. Created in 1922, it was the first regular airline in Poland. Throughout its existence, the airline attained a 100 percent safety record. Nationalised in 1928, it became the core of LOT Polish Airlines, the flag carrier of Poland.

== History ==
The company was formed in 1922 by Ignacy Wygard, Bronisław Dunin-Żuchowski and Kazimierz Unruch, three co-owners of Fanto, the largest oil producing company of former Austria-Hungary. Their intention was to allow oil barons like themselves to travel quickly between the Borysław and Drohobycz oilfields, Warsaw where their company had its headquarters, and the port of Danzig, through which they exported most of their products. The newly created "Polish Air Line Aerolloyd" company was formed with financial backing of German Norddeutscher Lloyd company, who tried to open its own airline in Danzig, since 1923 running under the name of Deutscher Aero Lloyd. Aero Lloyd's Danzig subsidiary, the Lloyd Ostflug (Lloyd Eastern Airlines) headed by Erhard Milch, started operations shortly after World War I but had to limit its activities due to French pressure. Consequently, its aircraft were leased to the new Polish company. They received Polish civilian registrations, but also affectionate male names, the initial of the nickname reflected the last letter in the registration. Thus P-PALB became 'Bronek', P-PALC became 'Cezar', and so on. (Note: Other aircraft received the names of Adam, Bronek, Cezar, Daniel, Edward, Franek, Gustaw, Henryk, Karol, Ludwik, Mietek Janek, Nasiek Tadek, Olek, Paweł, Roman, Stefan and Ursyn.)

Aerolloyd was not the first airline in Poland, but it was the first to offer regular flights and survive. The company enjoyed subsidies from the government of Poland who allowed its aircraft to use military airfields in Poland free of charge for lack of purpose-built civilian airports. The government also repaid Mp.130 for every kilometre and allowed the company access to meteorological data from military weather stations.

Based in the Free City of Danzig, the airline initially operated a Danzig-Warsaw-Lwów line, in 1924 a Warsaw-Kraków link was added to the timetable. In 1925 it was extended to Vienna (since 1926 by way of Brno), and a new line linking Kraków with Lwów was added.

From the very start the company was pressured by the Polish government to "polonise" its staff and shareholders, and to buy planes from Poland's allies rather than from Germany. However, as Junkers' prices were much lower, the company decided to stick with German aircraft, but bought them from Junkers' Swedish subsidiary rather than from Dessau directly. To counter potential political repercussions, in 1925 the company was renamed to Aerolot, its former German shareholders were repaid and the company moved its technical base from Danzig's Langfuhr Airfield to Mokotów Airport in Warsaw's Pole Mokotowskie. The new air depot was the first civilian air facility in Poland, although the airfield itself was shared with the Polish Air Force. In 1926 a Warsaw-Łódź line was also started. The following year a connection between Warsaw and Wilno (now Vilnius, Lithuania) was planned, but eventually the idea was scrapped as not feasible economically. The connection to Łódź was also closed down.

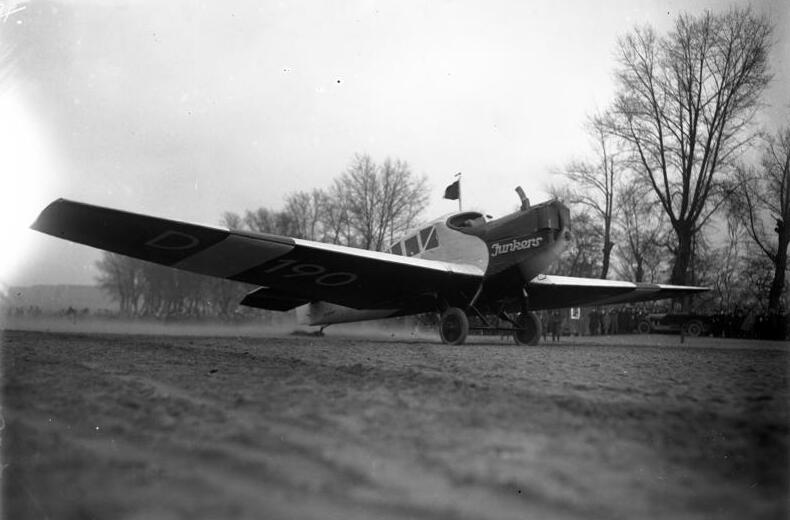
Junkers F.13 of the Lloyd Ostflug airline at Tempelhof. In 1922 six F.13s were taken over by Aerolloyd. This particular aircraft received Polish registration of P-PALF in October 1923.

Initially the airline operated six Junkers F.13 transport aircraft flown by pilots from Junkers factory in Dessau and with pilots and technicians of the Junkers Luftverkehr. With time they were replaced with Polish pilots trained at Dessau. By 1926 ten more Junkers F.13 aircraft were acquired. In 1925 Aerolloyd bought a single three-motor Junkers G 23W floatplane for the planned Danzig-Malmö-Copenhagen line, but the aeroplane was returned to the producer after trial flights.

On 4 January 1927 Ignacy Wygard, the vicepresident of Aerolot, initiated the creation of Polish Air Union. The union was formed by Aerolot, its main competitor Aero airline and Silesian Air Society operating the newly constructed Katowice-Muchowiec Airport and intending to become a fully-fledged airline. Eventually on 28 December 1928 all three companies were nationalised by the Polish government and merged to form LOT Polish Airlines, the Polish flag carrier. Soon before the merger, Aerolot's former German partners also had merged to form Deutsche Luft Hansa, the flag carrier of Germany.
