= Junkers F 13 =

Type of airplane

F 13
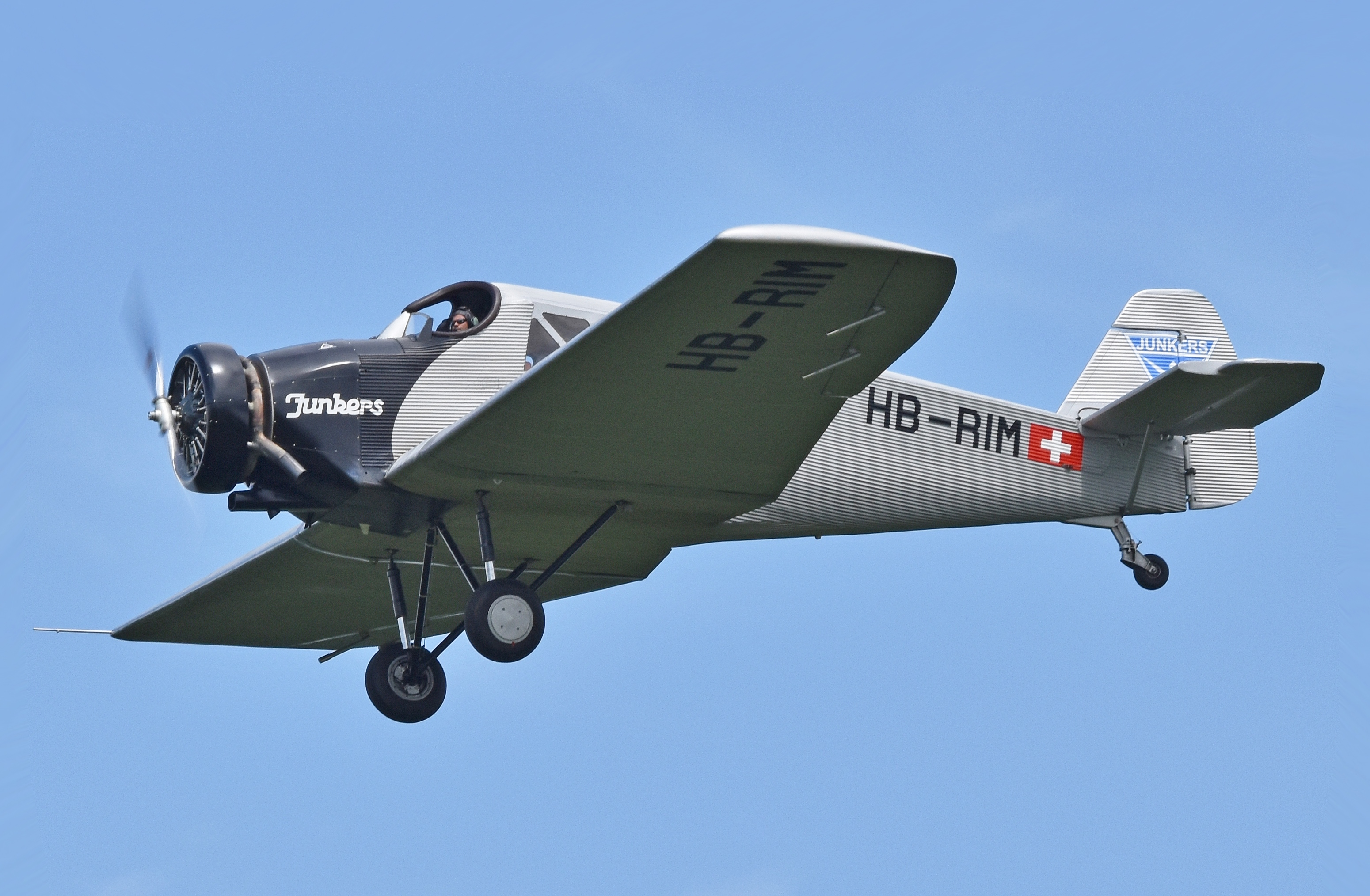
- Junkers F 13 over the Aérodrome de Cerny-La-Ferté-Alais

General information
- Type: passenger transport
- Manufacturer: Junkers
- Designer: Otto Reuter
- Primary users: Junkers Luftverkehr DLH; LAB; LOT; ÖLAG; SCADTA; Varig
- Number built: 322

History
- Manufactured: 1919–1932/2009-2019
- Introduction date: 1920
- First flight: 25 June 1919
- Retired: late 1930s (1951 in Brazil)

The Junkers F 13 is the world's first all-metal transport aircraft, designed and produced by the German aircraft manufacturer Junkers.

Produced shortly after the end of the First World War, it was a cantilever-wing monoplane with enclosed accommodation for four passengers and a two seat open cockpit. Like all Junkers duralumin-structured designs, from the 1918 J 7 to the 1932 Ju 46, (some 35 models), it has an aluminium alloy (duralumin) structure entirely covered with Junkers' characteristic corrugated and stressed duralumin skin. Internally, the wing was built up on nine circular cross-section duralumin spars with transverse bracing. All control surfaces were horn balanced.

A total of 322 aircraft were manufactured, a considerably large number for a commercial airliner of the era, and were operated all over the world. It accounted for over a third of air traffic in the early 1920s. It remained in production for thirteen years and in commercial service for more than thirty. There were many versions including floatplanes for water landing, skis, mailplane, and different engines. Several survive in various states of repair in museums, and a replica of the type was put back in production in the 2010s, taking flight once again nearly a century after the type first flew.

== Development ==
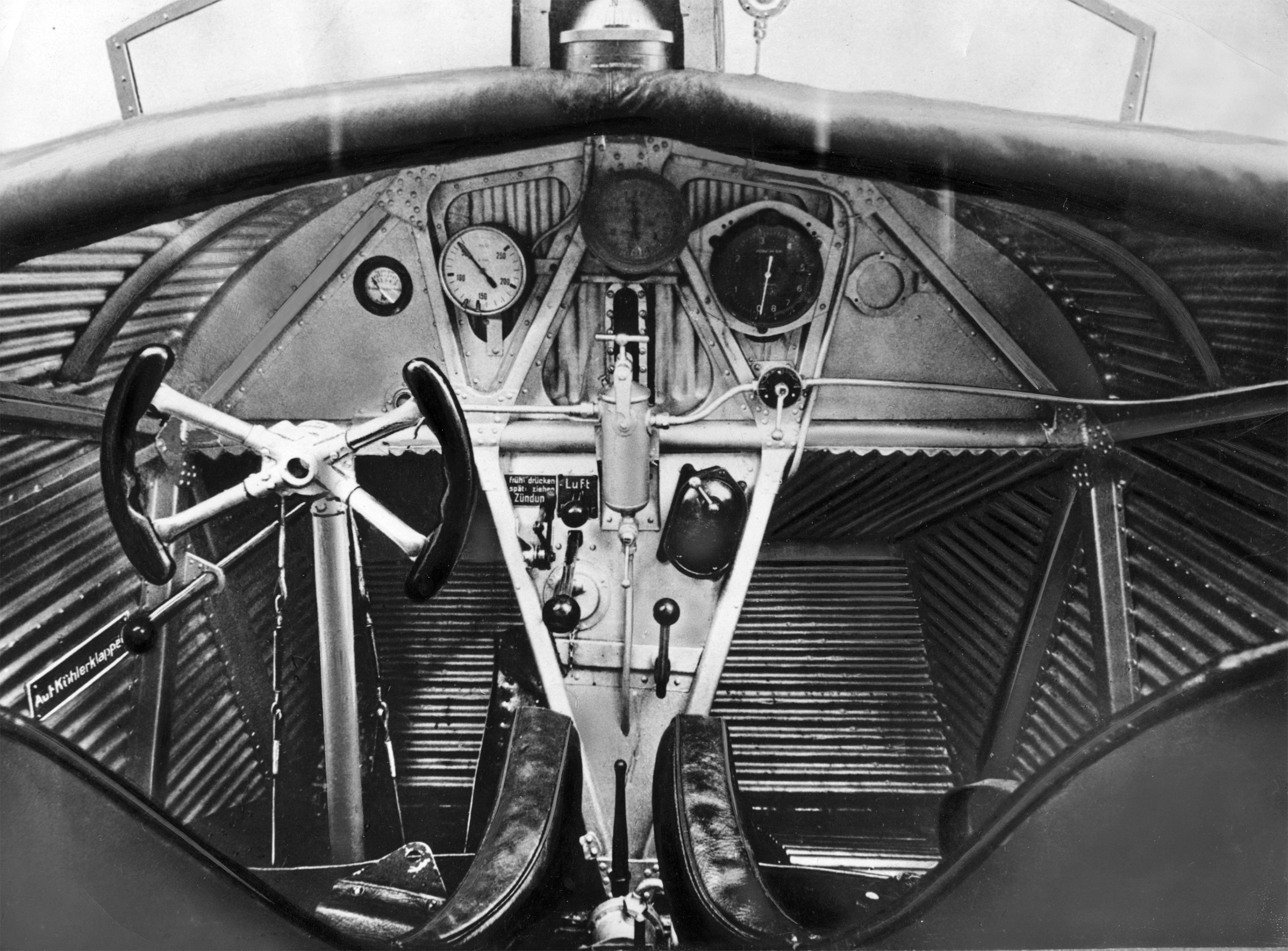
F 13 cockpit

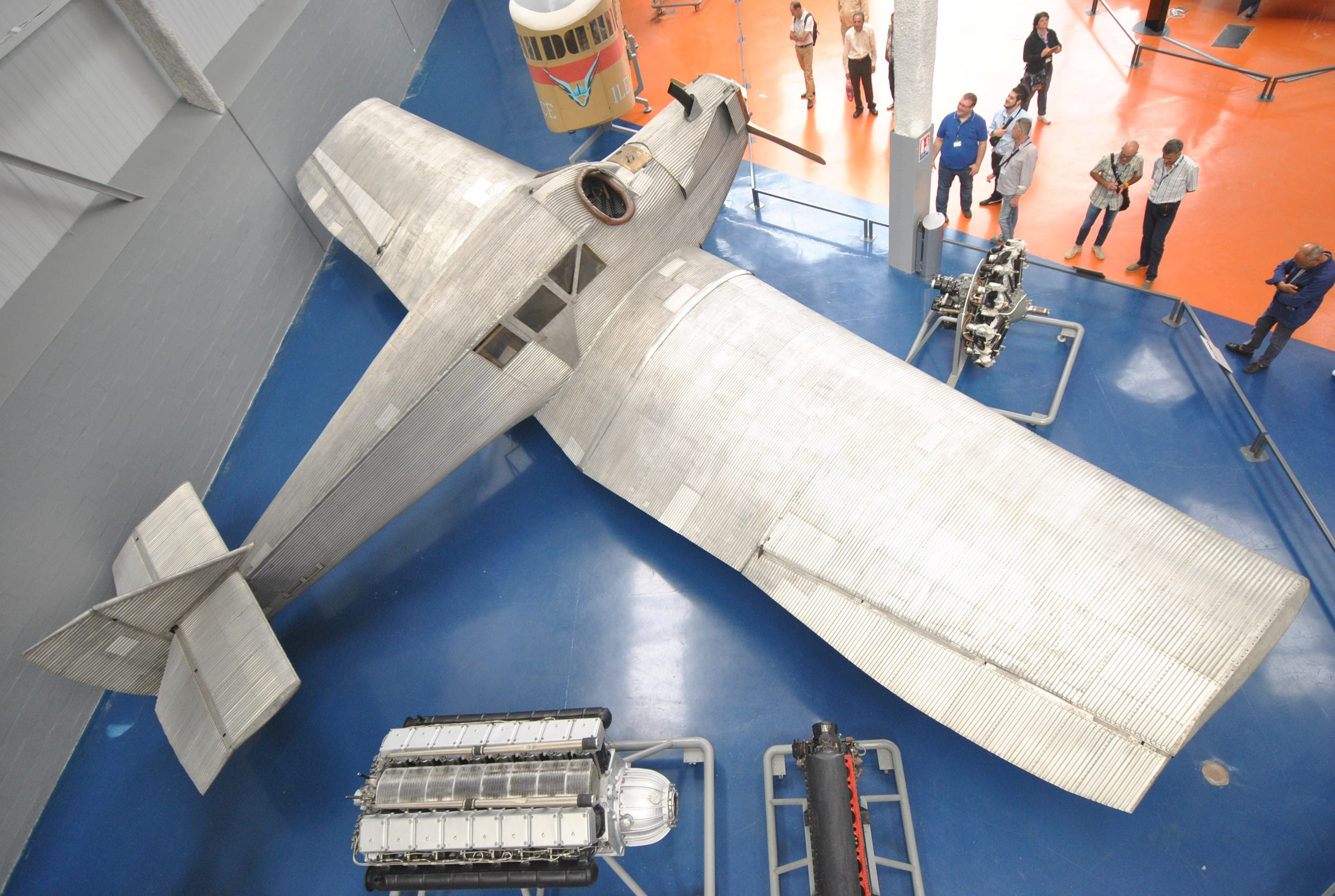
The Junkers F 13 viewed from above at the Musée de l’air et de l’espace

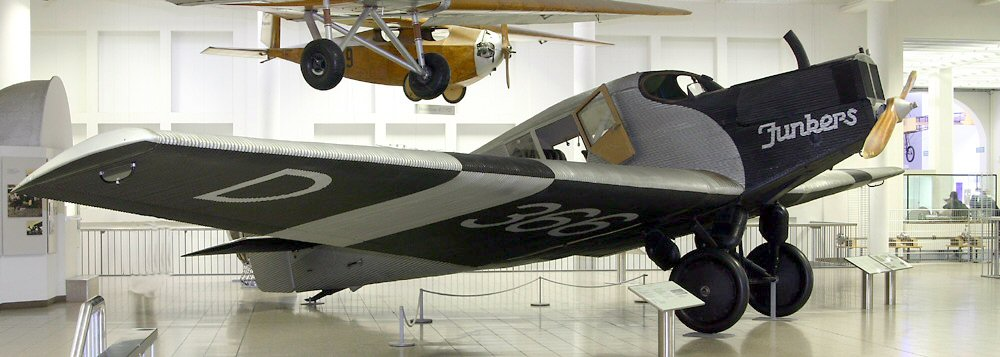
Deutsches Museum's F 13

What would become the F 13 originated in the work of Professor Hugo Junkers and his Research Institute in Dessau, Germany throughout the 1910s. These efforts were responsible for producing multiple new ideas pertaining not only to aerodynamics but also the employment and working of lightweight metal construction in aviation.

The F 13 was a very advanced aircraft when built, an aerodynamically clean all-metal low-wing cantilever monoplane. It was the world's first all-metal passenger aircraft and Junkers' first commercial aircraft. The designation letter F stood for Flugzeug (aircraft); it was the first Junkers aeroplane to use this system. Earlier Junkers notation labelled it J 13. Russian-built aircraft used the designation Ju 13.

The F 13 first flew on 25 June 1919, powered by a 127 kW (170 hp) Mercedes D.IIIa inline upright water-cooled engine. The first production machines had a wing of greater span and area and was furnished with the more powerful 140 kW (185 hp) BMW IIIa upright inline water-cooled motor.

Many variants were built using Mercedes, BMW, Junkers, and Armstrong Siddeley Puma liquid-cooled inline engines, and Gnome-Rhône Jupiter and Pratt & Whitney Hornet air-cooled radial engines. The variants were mostly distinguished by a two letter code, the first letter signifying the airframe and the second the engine. Junkers L5-engined variants all had the second letter -e, so type -fe was the long fuselage -f airframe with a L5 engine.

The F13 was the basis for developing the Junkers W 33 and Junkers W 34.

== Design ==
The Junkers F 13 was an all-metal transport aircraft; its construction and several of its design features, such as its cantilever wing, were particularly noteworthy for the era. Unlike traditional wings of the era, which had to use external struts and guywires out of necessity, the wing of the F 13 lacked any stay-wires; their elimination meant that a major source of drag was entirely avoided. Instead of exposing the supporting elements to the external air currents, all of the bracing was located within the wing itself, thus providing a neater solution from an aerodynamic perspective. As a consequence of this arrangement, the profile of the wing had to be considerable thicker to accommodate these supporting members; while orthodox attitudes of the era favoured thin profiles, the aerodynamic qualities of the F 13 was quite favourable, largely as a result of diligent experimentation. Another advantage was that, while the polar curve for thin profile wings typically had a relatively restricted range of application, such as for high-speed flight or a rapid rate of climb, of a higher climb, the polar curve of thicker profile wings could perform more adequately across both circumstances.

In terms of its material composition, the F 13 had intentionally discarded traditional materials, such as wood and fabric, in favour of an all-metal approach that had been pioneered by Junkers. This switch eliminated concerns over the variable quality of available wood, and the procurement difficulties in obtaining high quality wood that would be well-suited for aeronautical purposes. It also dispensed with various other concerns, as it was perceived as more difficult to maintain the calibrated dimensions of wood due to warping, the same factor also hindered interchangeability; metal posed less of a fire hazard as well. Unlike Junker's early metal aircraft, which was composed of steel and thus quite heavy, the F 13 was made of duralumin, a light-weight alloy that would find widespread use in aeronautical circles. This metal has greater uniform strength to the aircraft, which made it easier to design; greater ease of calculation increased the economics of this choice as well.

Somewhat offsetting the difficulties of developing a new arrangement to permit the installation of all supporting framework internally, the use of metal enabled a substantial number of new construction features to be adopted. Although the specific gravity of duralumin is greater than that of wood, the weight of the Junkers F 13 was beneath that of all other airplanes, wood or metal, of the same class, as a result of thorough aerodynamic studies conducted by the company. Furthermore, it was also felt that the metal approach would increase structural safety and serviceability. In comparison to its wooden contemporaries, the F 13's all-metal approach was slower to fatigue; it was also less expensive to protect against humidity and most other atmospheric conditions. Termites were unable to damage metal aircraft. It was partially for this reason that use of the F 13 in various tropical countries, particularly those in South America, quickly became commonplace. In general, the life of a metal aircraft was believed to be far greater than that of a wooden one.

The supporting surface, which was the basis of the structure, comprises three parts, in order to facilitate transportation. The outer portions of the wings were secured to the framework of the central wing section, whose spars consisted of nine duralumin tubes, in a manner that assured symmetry of the wings. These wings could be mounted and demounted by two men within a few minutes. A cantilever girder comprised the core of the wing's framework. The external metal covering, which was corrugated for increased strength, helped to withstand the stress of torsion while the overall structure was fairly resistant to dynamic overloading. In another departure from conventional practices of the time, the fuselage was placed on the wing; this permitted the framework of the wing's central section to form the base of both the fuselage and the cabin. Accordingly, the aircraft had a relatively strong superstructure while also reducing its weight. One advantage of the position of the wing was that it afforded the best possible protection to the cabin and its occupants, in the event of a rough or emergency landing.

The flight controls were fairly conventional, both the elevator and ailerons were actuated by the pilot via a column with a wheel while the rudder was operated using pedals. Various sliding doors were present for inspection and serviceability purposes for the various control cables, levers, and tubes. Provision was made for the installation of dual flight controls, a feature that was thought to be of particular importance during long-range flights. All of the tail surfaces had fairly large areas that benefitted not only the aircraft's manoeuvrability but also its steadiness in flight. Another departure from convention was the means of adjusting the stabilizer to compensate for weight variations; a trimming tank positioned near the rear of the fuselage could offset nose-heaviness or tail-heaviness by means of a pump controlled by the pilot that would withdraw or add sufficient fuel to achieve equilibrium.

The undercarriage was largely composed of steel tubing; a total of four streamlined supports functioned as spring struts. A V-shaped strut arrangement assured sufficient rigidity while the distance between the wheels was thought to be sufficient to prevent the aircraft turning over even during an oblique landing. The tail skid was both jointed and shock-absorbing; it could be readily replaced and was sizable enough to protect the fuselage from sustaining serious damage. Furthermore, special connections were present for the installation of floats, which could be rapidly substituted for the wheels, to convert the F 13 into a floatplane. These floats, which were made of duralumin, were each internally divided into six tight compartments. The aircraft could be similarly equipped for taking off or landing upon snow or ice via the removal of the wheels and substituting them for duralumin runners while a shoe would be attached to the tail skid.

The aerodynamic efficiency of the F 13 meant that less engine power than had been anticipated could be used; various engines from a variety of suppliers could be installed. Easy access to all points of the engine was possible while various components could be exchanged within a short timeframe. The frontal radiator was specially designed by Junkers to possess a high level of efficiency as well as being relatively lightweight; the pilot was able to regulate the engine temperature via the adjustable shutters. Those aircraft intended for use in a tropical country were typically provided with an additional radiator. Considerable attention was paid to the development of propellers, which was shaped by extensive research into aspects such as the pitch, blade section and diameter. The initial propellers used were composed of laminated wood that was protected by metal along their leading edges and achieved a mechanical efficiency at least equal to that of wooden ones. Junkers also worked on metal propellers of its own make, the hollow sections of which diminishes in line with the laws of bodies of uniform resistance. Advantages presented by metal propellers include the ability to replace a single blade (instead of the whole propeller), a lack of sensitivity to climate influences, and the potential to shape the propeller hub to vary the propeller pitch for either speed or climb.

Behind the single engine was a semi-enclosed cockpit for the crew, roofed but without side glazing. There was an enclosed and heated cabin completed with both with windows and doors. Passenger seats were fitted with seat belts, unusual for the time. The F 13 has a fixed conventional split landing gear with a rear skid, though some variants were fitted with floats or on skis. The cabin was relatively sizable and elegantly furnished for the era; in addition to the four passengers it accommodated, room for another passenger or crew member was present alongside the pilot.

== Operational history ==
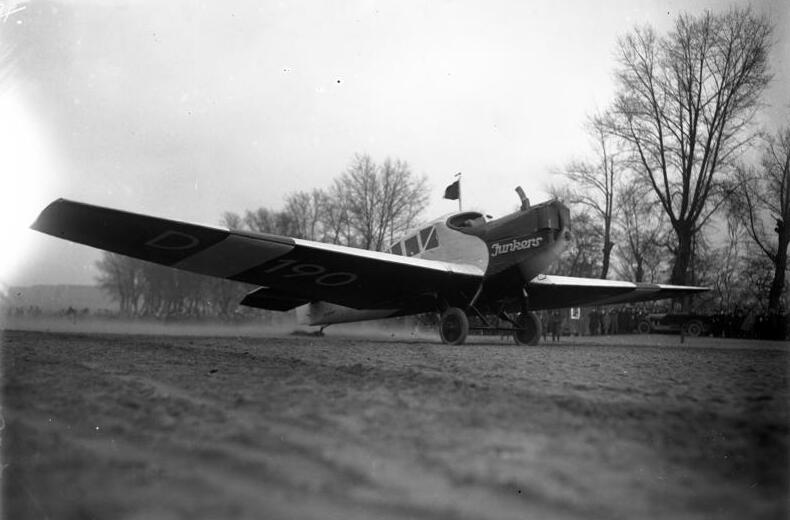
F 13 fy D-190 of Lloyd Ostflug then Junkers Luftverkehrs AG.

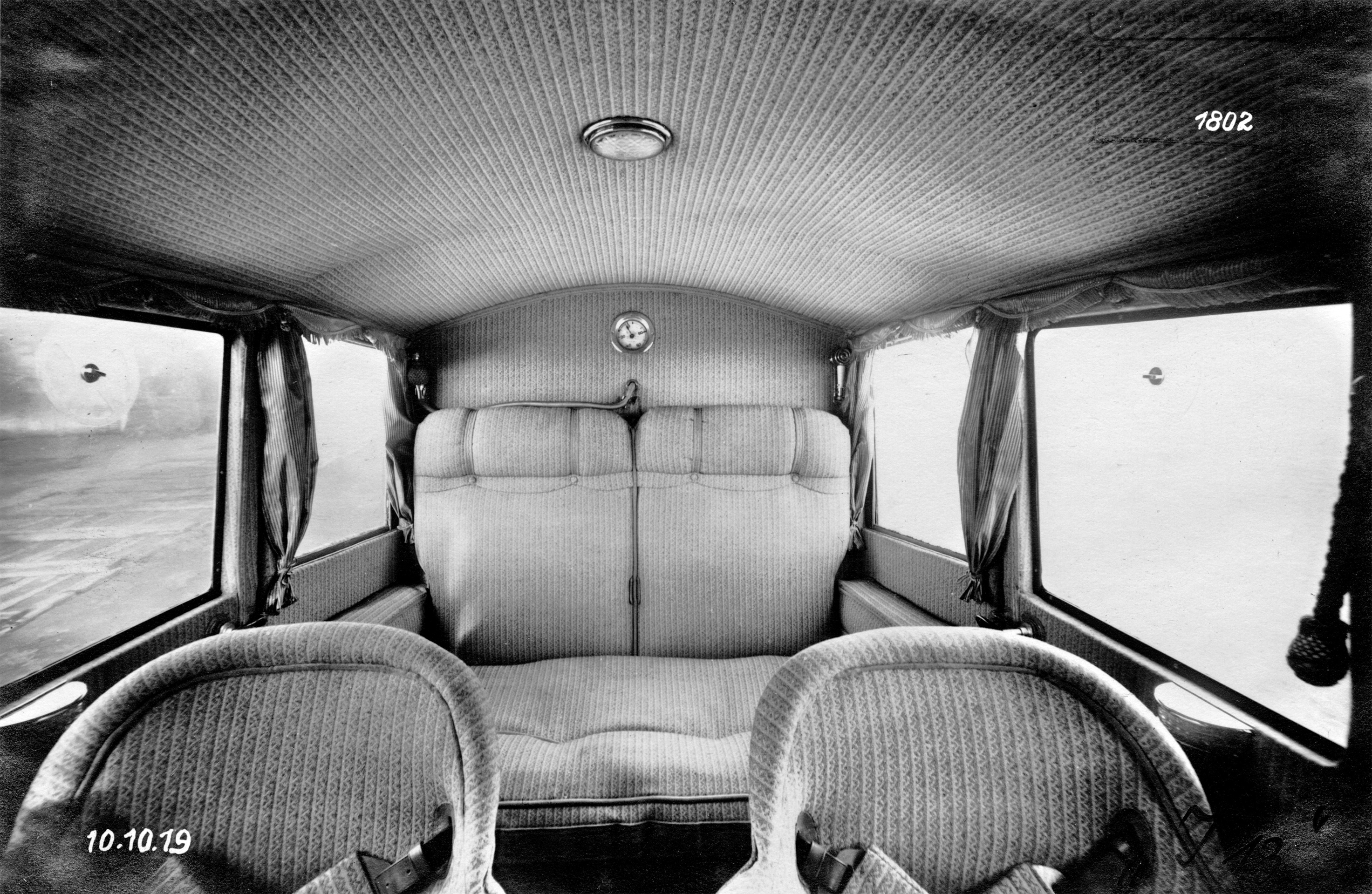
The F13 cabin for passengers

Any manufacturer of civil aircraft immediately after World War I was faced with competition from the very large numbers of surplus warplanes that might be cheaply converted – for example, the DH.9C. German manufacturers had further problems with the restrictions imposed by the Inter-Allied Aeronautical Commission of Control, which banned the production of warplanes and of any aircraft in the period of 1921-22. Junkers picked up orders abroad in 1919 in Austria, Poland and the USA and, in the following years with SCADTA (Colombia) and the United States Post Office Department. John Larsen Aircraft in the USA purchased a production licence, their machines being designated JL-6. In 1922 there were sales in England, France, Italy, and Japan.

The F13 was a very popular civilian aircraft, carrying it is estimated 40% of the world's air traffic in the early 1920s.

In Bolivia, LAB's first airplane was a Junkers F 13; first flight took off from Cochabamba on September 23, 1925.

Junkers set up its own airline – Junkers Luftverkehr AG in 1921 to encourage the acquisition of the F 13 by German airlines and was flying 60 of them by 1923. It also established a branch of the airline in Iran. Other marketing techniques were used, providing F 13s on cheap leases and free loans, with such effect that some 16 operators across Europe were flying them. When Junkers Luftverkehr merged into Luft Hansa in 1926, 9.5 million miles had been flown by them. Luft Hansa itself bought 55 aircraft and in 1928 was using them on 43 domestic routes. Even in 1937, its F 13s were flying over 50 flights per week on four routes. They were finally withdrawn in 1938.

Most of the F 13s produced before production ended in 1932 were built at Junkers German base at Dessau. During the difficult 1921–23 period production was transferred to Junkers plants at Danzig and Reval. In 1922–23, Hugo Junkers signed a contract with the Soviet Union to produce the aircraft in a Soviet factory at Fili near Moscow, which became known as "Plant no. 22". Some of these aircraft served Soviet airlines while others were used by the Red Army.

There were some other military users. The Colombian Air Force used the F 13 (and the related W.33, W.34 and K.43) as bombers in the Colombia–Peru War in 1932–33. The Republic of China flew F 13s converted into scout bombers until the January 28 Incident in 1932, when they were destroyed by the Japanese along with the Shanghai Aircraft Factory. The Turkish Flying Forces flew a few.

A feature that made the F 13 popular internationally was the ease with which its landing gear could be converted to floats. During the formative years of commercial aviation, bodies of water such as rivers, lakes, seas and oceans were more abundant than landing strips and civil airports in many parts of the world, so seaplanes were commonplace and even, in some places, more useful than regular aircraft. Aside from the obvious addition of floats, little modification was needed for this conversion; however, the different configuration could cause issues with directional control, and so some models had their rudder extended to compensate for this.

From their introduction in 1919 F 13s were in service for more than thirty years; the last commercial F 13 was retired in Brazil in 1951.

== Back in production 2009-2019 ==
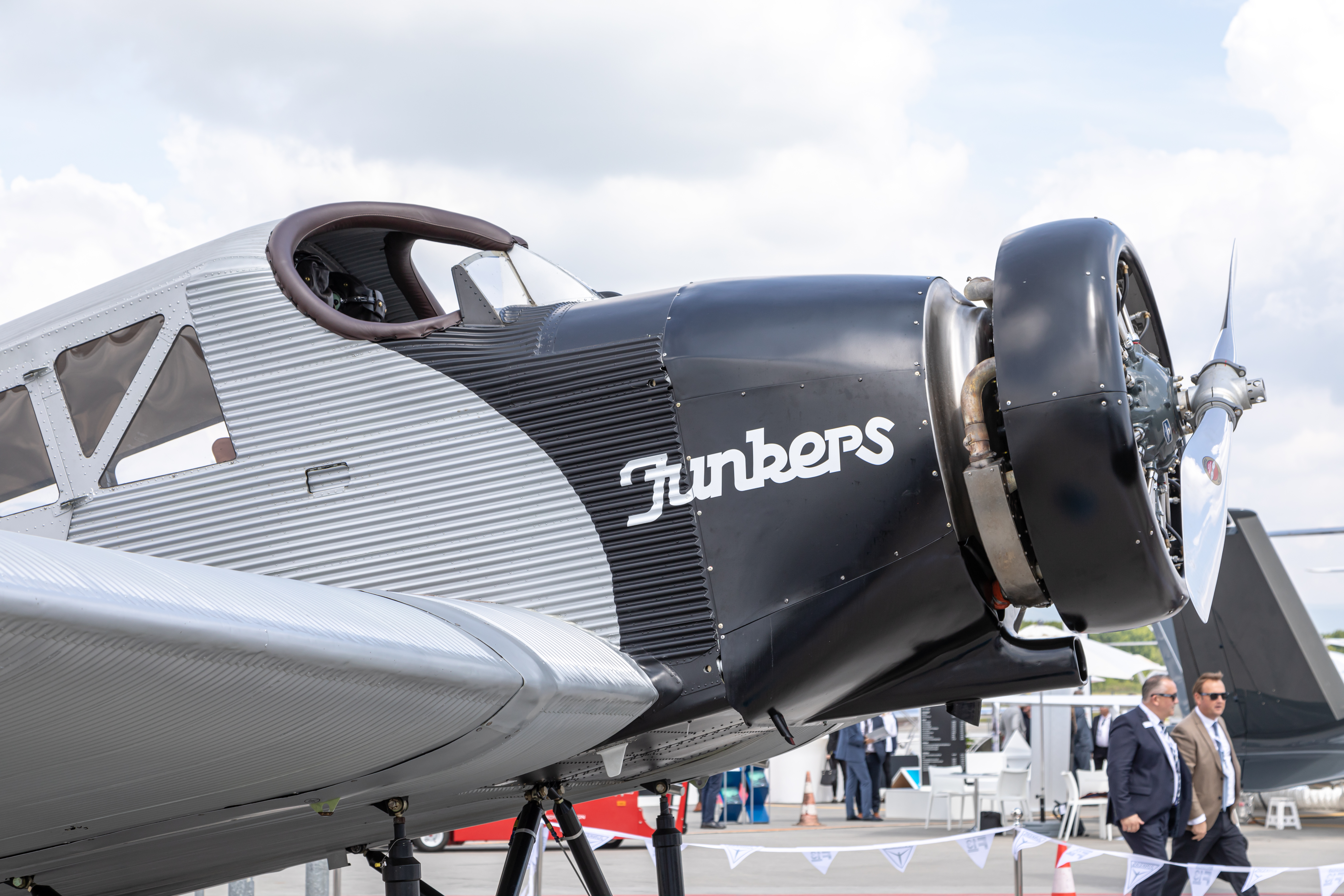
Replica F 13 nose, 2019

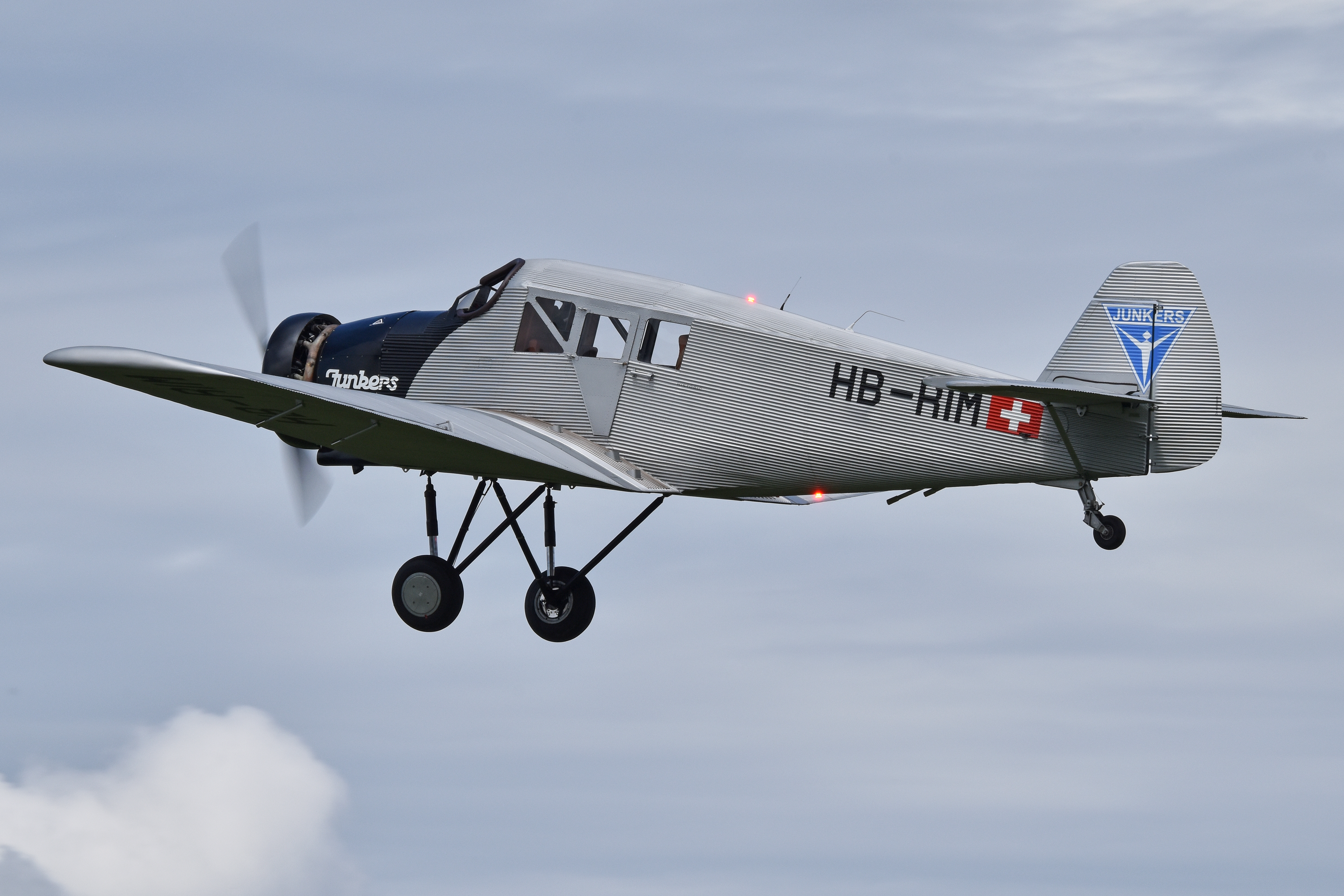
One of the new Junkers F 13 replicas

A German-Swiss project to build a reconstruction of the F 13 was launched in 2009; the first flight was in September 2016. The reconstruction is equipped with radio and a transponder, and uses a 1930s Pratt & Whitney R-985 Wasp Junior engine, but is otherwise as close as possible to the original. Additional reconstructions are to be sold for $2.5 million each.

Junkers Flugzeugwerke (SD303) has resurrected the Junkers F 13 as an all-new airplane to honor Hugo Junkers’ achievements. The company completed the aircraft in 2016 and it is at EBACE commemorating the type's maiden flight 100 years ago. The model is available for purchase, and three others like it are currently under construction. Work was in progress on the second and third aircraft during 2019, with airframe number two's maiden flight planned for early that summer.

The replica F 13 made its maiden flight on 15 September 2016, the culmination of many of years of work on the part of supporters of the project. . The replica was created from original blueprints and also a laser scan of the type at the Museum of Air and Space at Le Bourget, Paris. The replica has 2600 parts and tens of thousands of rivets and is powered by a Wasp radial engine.

== Variants ==
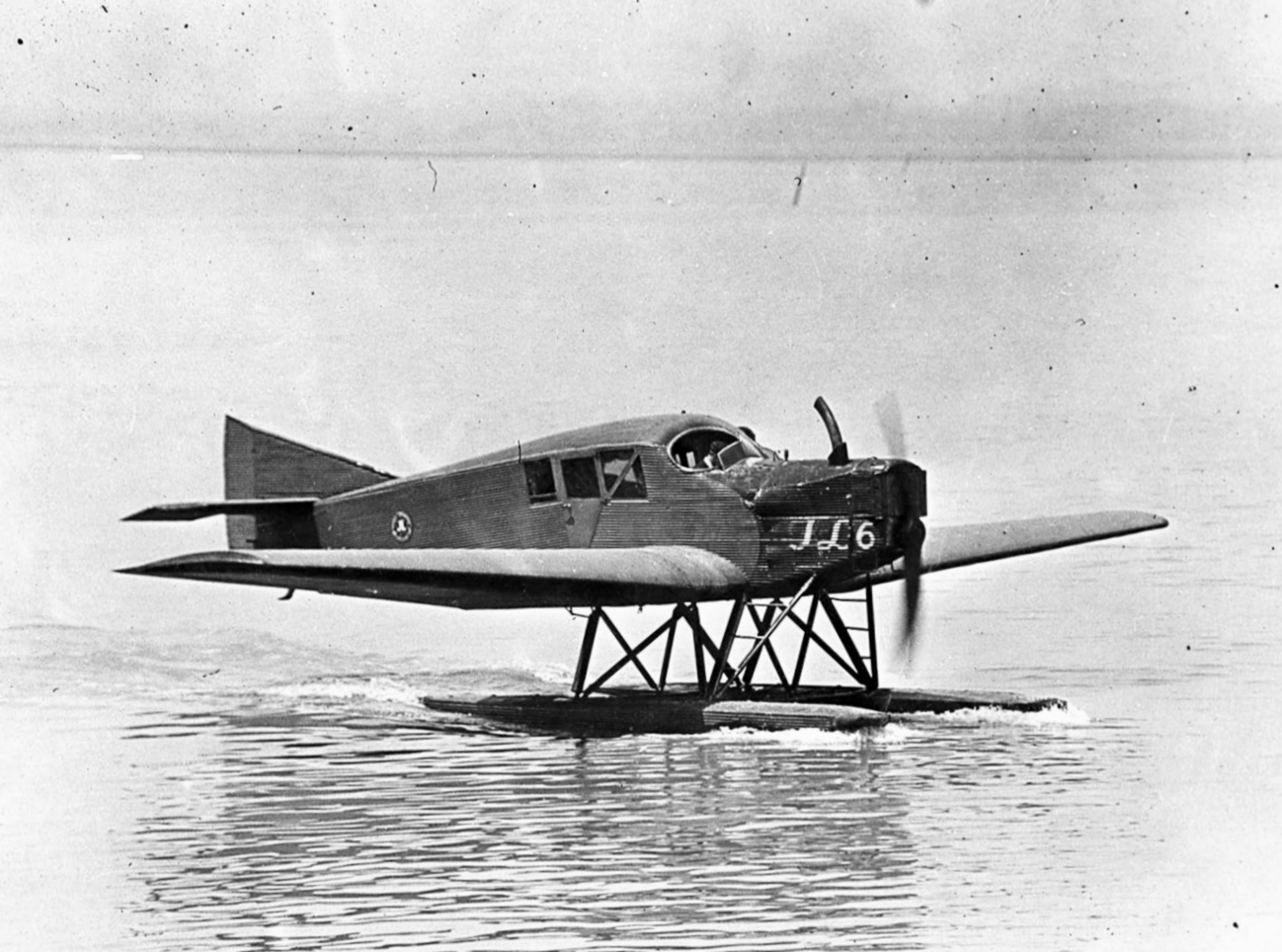
Junkers-Larsen JL-6 as a floatplane, 1920

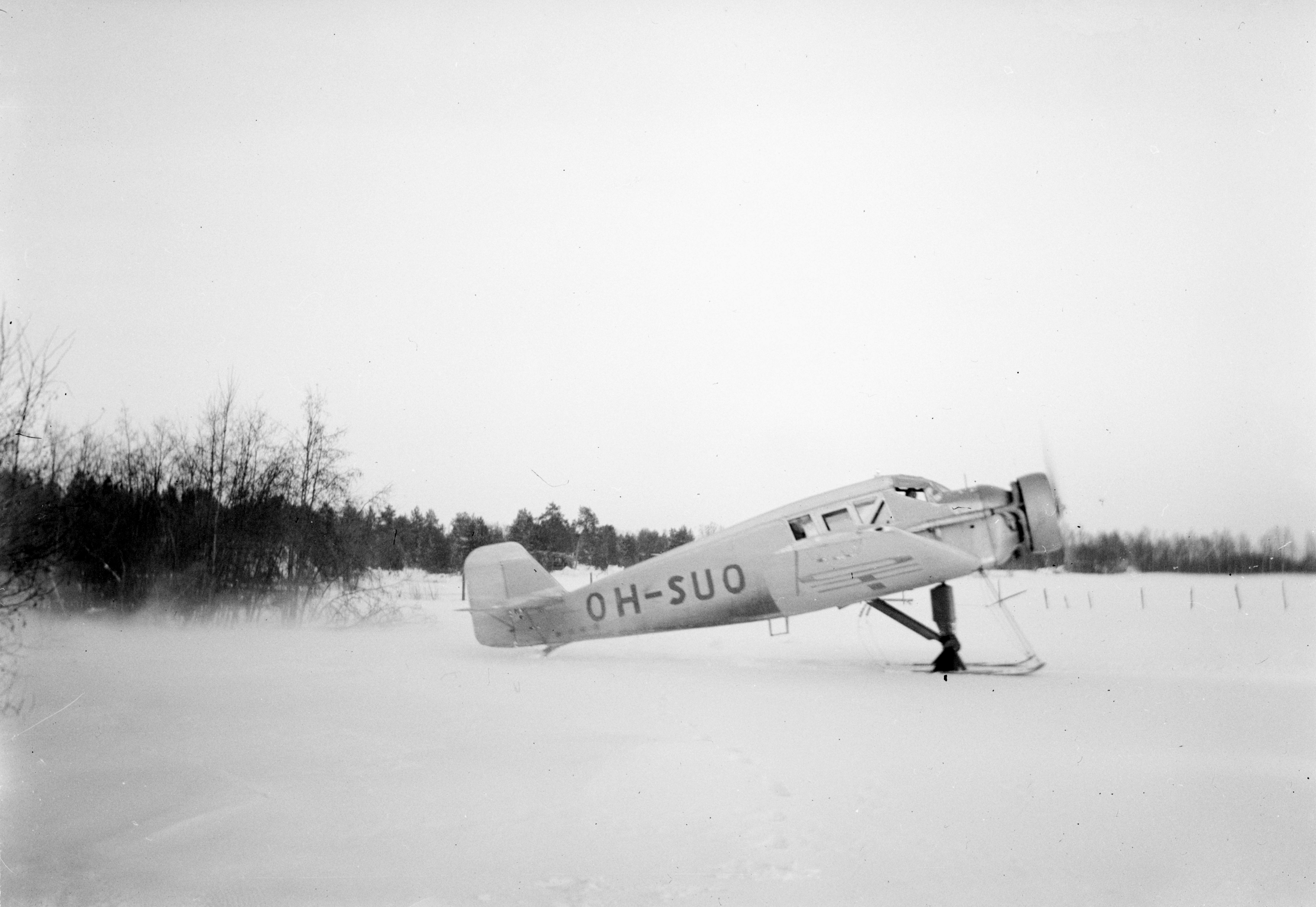
F 13 with a radial engine and skis, 1940

F 13
first prototype, smaller wings (span 14.47 m/47 ft 5.75 in, area 38.9 m^{2} /419 ft²) and less powerful engine 127 kW (170 hp) Mercedes D IIIa inline than production models.
F 13a
first production aircraft with 140 kW (185 hp) BMW IIIa engine.
F 13ba, ca, da, fa
all with the 149 kW (200 hp) Junkers L2 upright inline water-cooled engine and a series of structural modifications. The fa variant was about 1 m (3 ft) longer.
F 13be, ce, de, fe
as the above but all with 230 kW (310 hp) Junkers L5 upright inline water-cooled engines.
F 13dle, fle, ge, he, ke
variants with the Junkers L5 above.
F 13bi, ci, di, fi,
as ca to fa but all with the 186 kW (250 hp) BMW IV engine.
F 13co, fo, ko
with the 230 kW (310 hp) BMW Va engine.
Junkers-Larsen JL-6
American version of the F 13 built by Junkers-Larsen. Eight built.
Junkers-Larsen JL-12
Ground-attack derivative of the Junkers-Larsen JL-6, with 300 kW (400 hp) Liberty L-12 engine, armored, and armed with a downward-pointing battery of 30 Thompson submachine guns.
Rimowa Junkers F 13
Modern replica first flown 15 September 2016. With the approval of the Junkers heirs, Rimowa Junkers was renamed Junkers Flugzeugwerke AG, and moved to Altenrhein. Their models have modern features, like more and better instruments, while the outward appearance is the one of a Junkers-Larsen JL-6.

== Operators ==
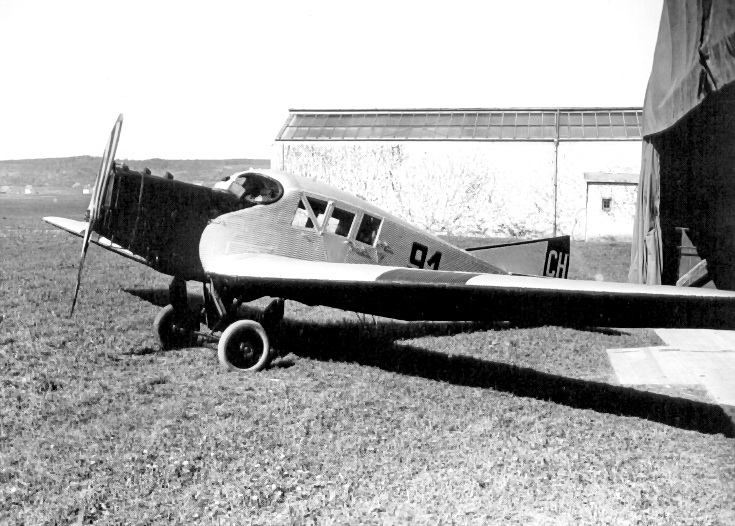
Ad Astra F13 circa 1920

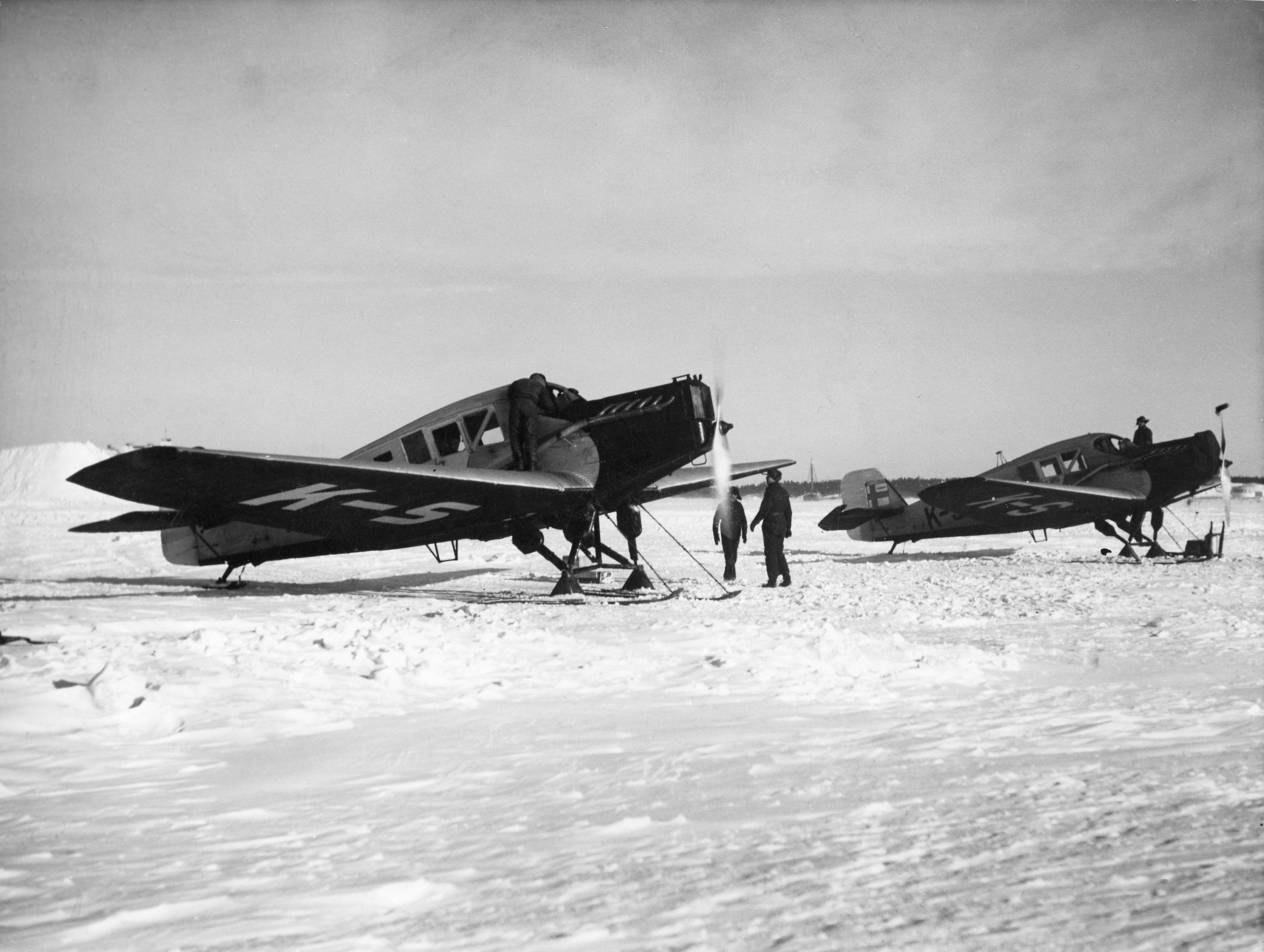
Finnish F13 in the 1920s

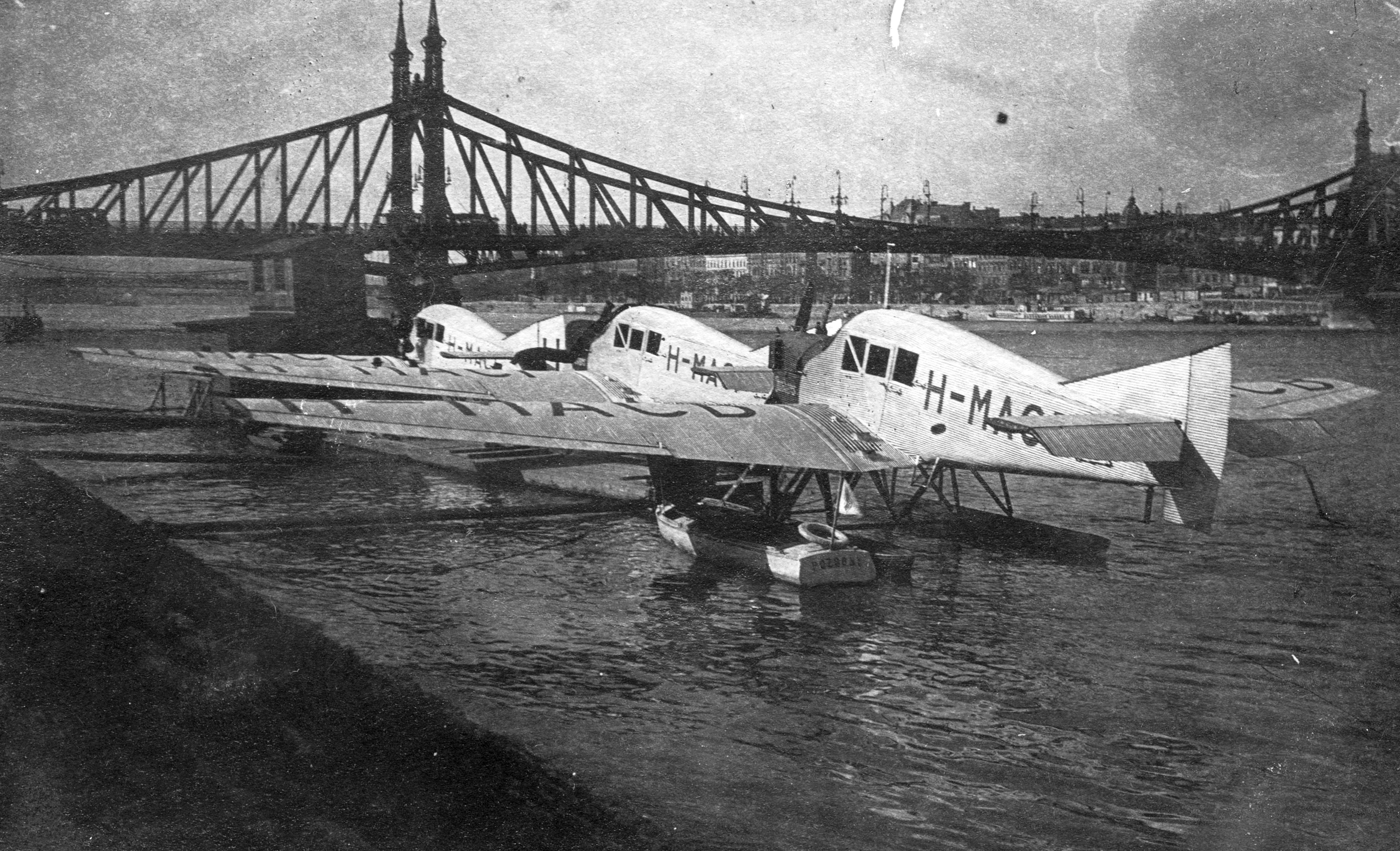
F13 floatplanes in Budapest, Hungary

Emirate of Afghanistan (Kingdom of Afghanistan after 1926)

- Afghan Air Force acquired four aircraft from 1924 through 1928.

Argentina

- Argentine Air Force - three aircraft

Austria

- Austrian Air Force (1927-1938)
- Österreichische Luftverkehrs AG (ÖLAG) started flying with F 13 and operated 24 aircraft

Belgium

- SNETA

Bolivia

- Lloyd Aéreo Boliviano received the first F 13 as a gift from the German community on the occasion of the centennial of Bolivian independence.

Brazil

- Syndicato Condor - Serviços Aéreos Condor
- Varig

Bulgaria

- Bulgarian Air Force
- Bunavad operated two aircraft between 1927 and 1928.

Chile

- Chilean Air Force

China
Colombia

- Avianca as SCADTA
- Colombian Air Force

Free City of Danzig

- Danziger Luftpost
- Lloyd Ostflug

Estonia

- Aeronaut operated F 13 between 1922 and 1927.

Finland

- Aero Airways
- Kauhajoki Flying Club
- Finnish Air Force
- Finnish Border Guard

France

- Aeronautical Service

Germany

- Junkers Luftverkehr, primary user until merger with Deutscher Aero Lloyd into Deutsche Luft Hansa
- Deutsche Luft Hansa operated about 110 aircraft, a large part taken over from Junkers Luftverkehr.

Hungary

- Aero R.T. operated six aircraft between 1923 and 1927.
- Aeroexpress Rt. (1923−1930)
- Royal Hungarian Air Force

Iceland

- Air Iceland operated three aircraft between 1928 and 1931.

Iran

- Imperial Iranian Air Force

Iran had 5.1 of them were bought in 1923 and 2 of them were bought in 1924 named "Gilan" and "Mazandaran". Other 2 were bought second hand from Soviet Union numbered as 675 and 676 delivered on May 21st and 22nd 1924.

Italy
Japan
Latvia

- Latvijas Gaisa Satiksmes Akciju Sabiedriba - national airline, operated three aircraft in 1922–1925.

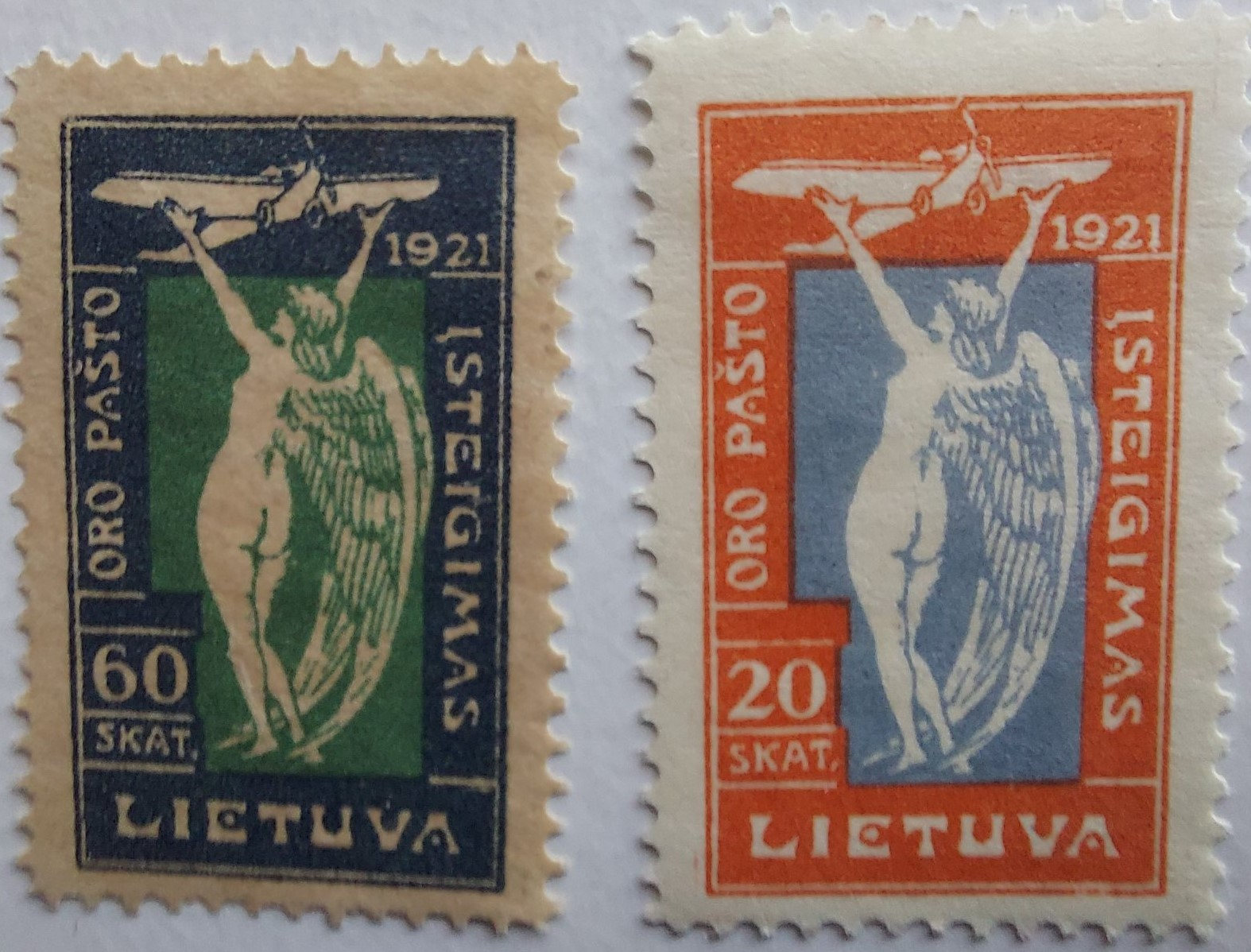
First Lithuanian Air Mail stamp (1921) featured Junkers F13.

Lithuania

- Lithuanian Air Force for a short period operated single aircraft, which crash-landed in Lithuania after illegally passing its border in 1919.

Mexico

- Mexican Air Force

Mongolia

- Mongolian People's Army Air Force operated three aircraft between 1925 and 1931.

Poland

- Aero-Targ leased six aircraft from Danziger Luftpost in 1921.
- Aerolloyd (later renamed Aerolot) operated 16 aircraft between 1922 and 1929.
- LOT Polish Airlines took over 15 remaining aircraft from Aerolot and operated them between 1929 and 1936.

Portugal

- Serviços Aéreos Portugueses operated one aircraft between 1929 and 1931.

Romania

- LARES
- Royal Romanian Air Force

Soviet Union

- Deruluft
- Aviaarktika operated several aircraft.
- Soviet Air Force

South Africa

- South African Airways operated four aircraft obtained from Union Airways.
- South African Air Force

Spain

- Union Aérea Española UAE
- Fuerzas Aéreas
- Cruz Roja Española

Sweden

- Swedish Air Force
- Aktiebolaget Aerotransport

Switzerland

- Ad Astra Aero operated at least four F 13s (registered CH-91/92/93/94) between 1919 and probably 1930.

Turkey

- Turkish Air Force operated three aircraft between 1925 and 1933.
- Turkish Air Post operated two ex-military aircraft between 1933 and 1938.
- General Command of Mapping (Turkey) operated one ex-air force aircraft (serial no: 882) equipped with aerial photo system from 1933 to 1938.

United Kingdom

- Civil register lists five F 13s during the 1930s

United States

- United States Post Office Department
- United States Navy

== Accidents and incidents ==
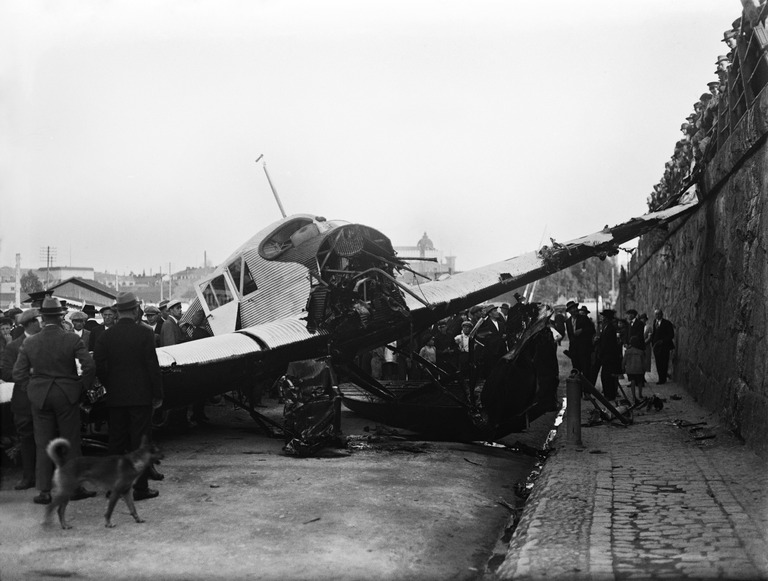
Emergency landing of Finnish Aero Oy's D335 by the VR warehouses, July 6, 1925, Helsinki

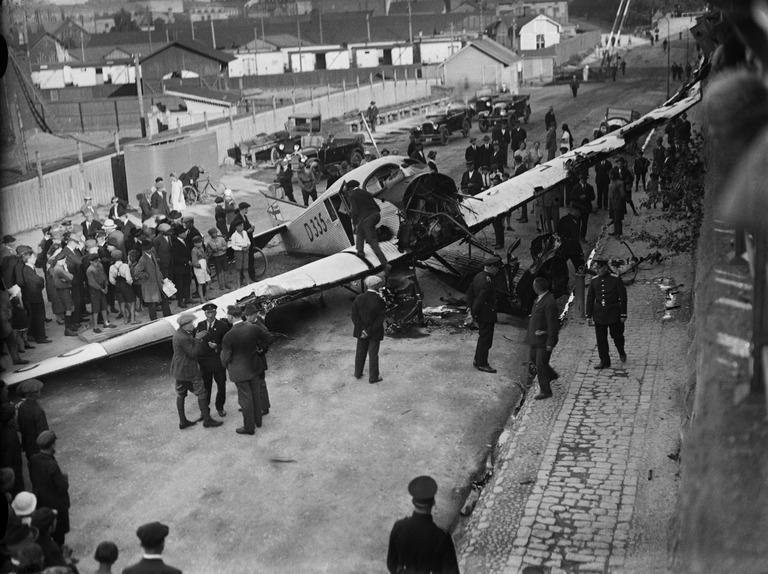
Another angle of the damaged airplane

- On 1 September 1920, a Junkers-Larsen JL-6 caught fire and crashed in Morristown, NJ. Max Miller, the United States Air Mail Service's first pilot was at the controls and, along with his mechanic/crewman, Gustav Reierson, perished. They managed to eject all nine mail bags before the plane hit the ground.
- On 8 June 1924, a SCADTA F 13, registration A13, stalled and crashed into a tree on takeoff from Barranquilla, Colombia, killing all five on board.
- On 10 March 1926, a Latvijas Gaisa Satiksmes F 13, c/n 579, registration No. B-LATA, operating for Aero O/Y, crashed on approach to Helsinki. No fatalities were registered.
- On 22 March 1925, a Zakavia F 13, registration R-RECA, crashed on takeoff from Tiflis, Georgia, killing all five on board. This crash is particularly famous because three high ranking Soviet officials died in the crash. Solomon Mogilevsky, Alexander Myasnikov, and Georgi Atarbekov who were flying to meet Trotsky who was in convalescence in Sukhum.
- On 24 July 1926, a Deutsche Luft Hansa F 13, registration D-272, crashed at Juist, Germany due to weather, killing all four on board.
- On 3 September 1926, a SCADTA F 13, registration A-10, collided with cloud-obscured terrain between Honda and La Victoria, Colombia. The two crew and two passengers were injured, and the aircraft was a total loss.
- On 27 July 1927, a Deutsche Luft Hansa F 13, registration D-206, crashed at Amöneburg, Germany after attempting an emergency landing due to engine failure, killing all five on board.
- On 26 May 1928 at 08:15, a Deutsche Lufthansa Junkers F 13, registration D-583, crashed at Hahnenberg, Radevormwald, Germany due to pilot error, killing three of five on board.
- On 21 July 1930, a Croydon-based Walcot Air Line F 13, registration G-AAZK, crashed at Meopham, near Gravesend, Kent, due to structural failure, killing all six on board including its second pilot, Lt Col George L P Henderson, a pilot with considerable skill and war-time experience.
- On 12 July 1932, Czech industrialist Tomáš Baťa died, together with pilot Jindrich Broucek, when his Junkers J13, registration D-1608 crashed after taking off in heavy fog.
- On 2 November 1932 a Deutsche Luft Hansa F 13, registration D-724, crashed at Echterspfahl, Germany due to wing separation, killing all five on board.
- 23 July 1933, registration CF-ALX named "City of Prince George" crashed into a tree on takeoff in the Canadian wilderness. The wreck was later recovered in 1981 and used as the basis for restoration for museum piece. The aircraft was originally named the Königsgeier (King Vulture).
- On 9 October 1935, an Aero O/Y F 13, registration OH-ALI, crashed into the Gulf of Finland in fog, killing all six on board.

== Survivors ==
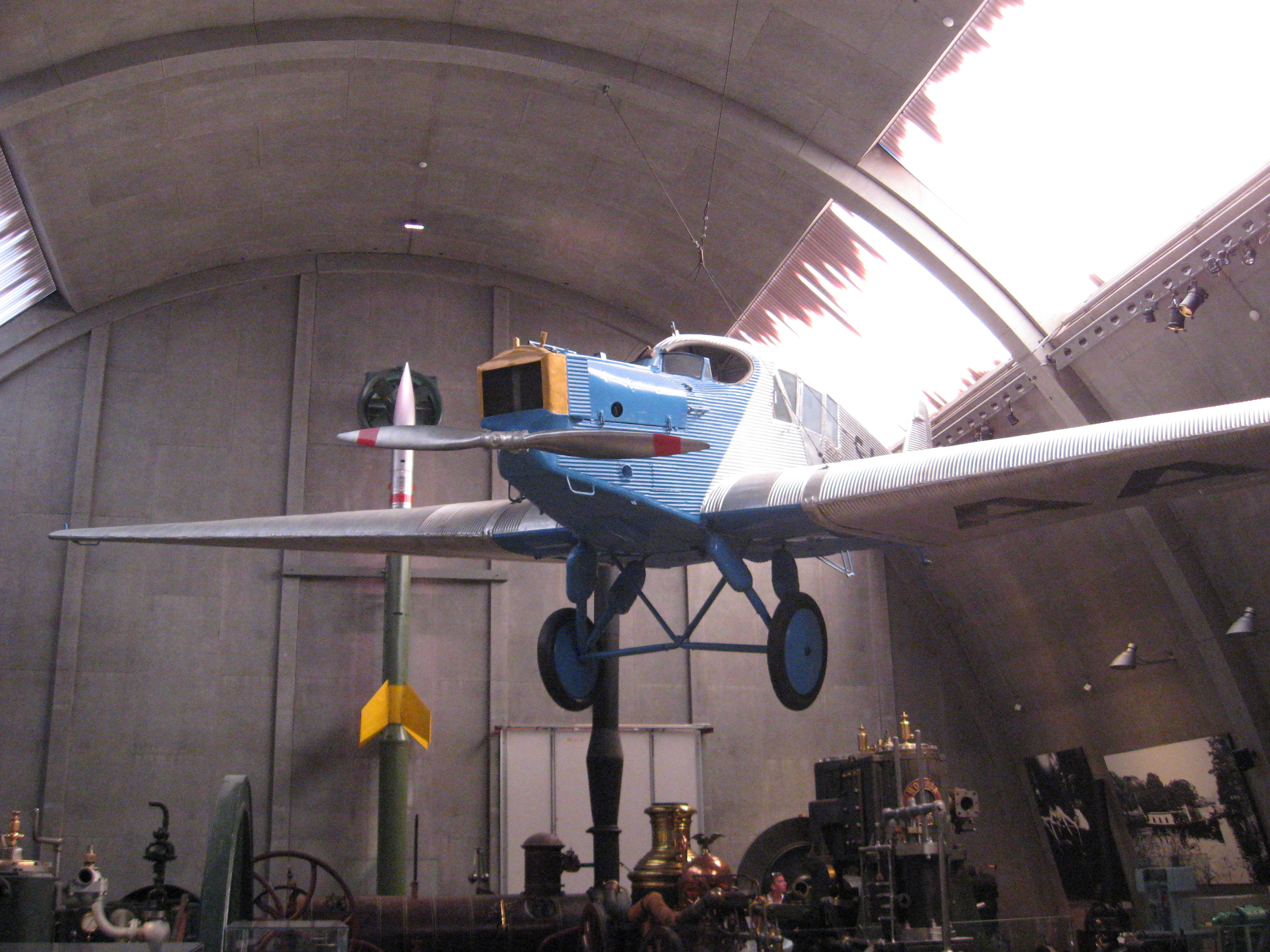
Serial number 715 at Tekniska Museet in Sweden. It flew with Junkers Luftverkehr (D-343) until 1924 and AB Aerotransport (SE-AAC) until 1935

There are five surviving F 13 airframes, all in museums.

Aircraft on display

- c/n 609: On display in the Interwar Gallery of the Musée de l'Air et de l'Espace, Le Bourget, Paris, France
- c/n 715, SE-AAC, ex-D-343: On display at the National Museum of Science and Technology (Sweden), Stockholm, Sweden.
- c/n 2018: On display at the Deutsches Museum, Munich, Germany. Exported to Afghanistan in 1928 and returned to Germany in 1968. Marked as D-366.
- c/n 2050 CF-ALX: On display at the Royal Aviation Museum of Western Canada, Winnipeg, Canada. Crashed near McConnell Lake, British Columbia, in 1933 and recovered in 1981. Wreckage formerly displayed at the German Museum of Technology, Berlin, Germany before being restored.

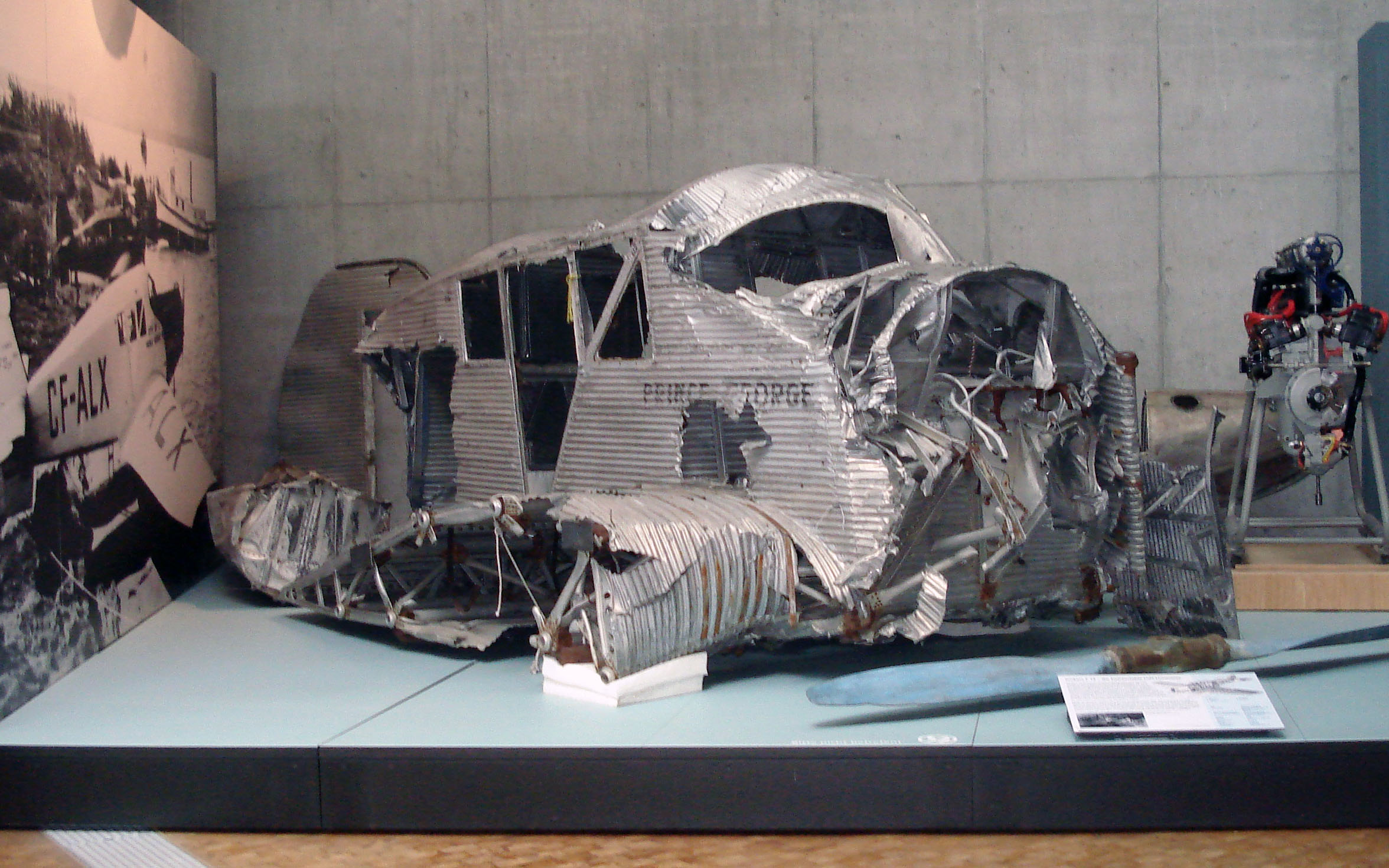
F 13 remains from Canada in the Deutsches Technikmuseum Berlin

In storage or under restoration

- c/n 574, CH-59: Part of the collection of the Hungarian Technical and Transportation Museum, Budapest, Hungary. Used by Charles I of Austria to fly from exile in Switzerland in an attempt to take power in Hungary.

Replicas

- Tomas Bata Memorial, Zlín, Czech Republic

== Specifications (F 13) ==
Junkers F 13

Data from Hugo Junkers Pionier der Luftfahrt - Seine Flugzeuge, Junkers: an aircraft album No.3

General characteristics

- Crew: two
- Capacity: four passengers or 689 kg (1,519 lb) payload
- Length: 9.59 m (31 ft 6 in)

F 13fe: 10.50 m (34 ft)

- Wingspan: 14.8 m (48 ft 7 in)

F 13fe: 17.75 m (58 ft)

- Height: 3.50 m (11 ft 6 in)

F 13fe: 3.60 m (12 ft)

- Wing area: 34.50 m^{2} (371.4 sq ft)

F 13fe: 44 m^{2} (474 sq ft)

- Empty weight: 951 kg (2,097 lb)

F 13fe: 1,480 kg (3,263 lb)

- Max takeoff weight: 1,640 kg (3,616 lb)

F 13fe: 2,318 kg (5,110 lb)

- Powerplant: 1 × Mercedes D.IIIa six-cylinder water-cooled in-line piston engine, 118 kW (158 hp)

F 13fe: 1 x 228 kW (306 hp) Junkers L5 six-cylinder water-cooled in-line piston engine

Performance

- Maximum speed: 173 km/h (107 mph, 93 kn)

F 13fe: 198 km/h (123 mph)

- Cruise speed: 160 km/h (99 mph, 86 kn)

F 13fe: 170 km/h (106 mph)

- Range: 1,400 km (870 mi, 760 nmi)
- Service ceiling: 5,000 m (16,000 ft)

F 13fe: 5,090 m (16,699 ft)

- Rate of climb: 2.40 m/s (472 ft/min)
- Power/mass: 0.0712 kW/kg (0.0443 hp/lb)

== See also ==
=== Related developments ===
- Junkers W 33
- Junkers W 34
- Junkers K 43
- Junkers Ju 46
