= Lasnamäe Airfield =

Airfield in Estonia

Lasnamäe Airfield Lasnamäe lennuväli
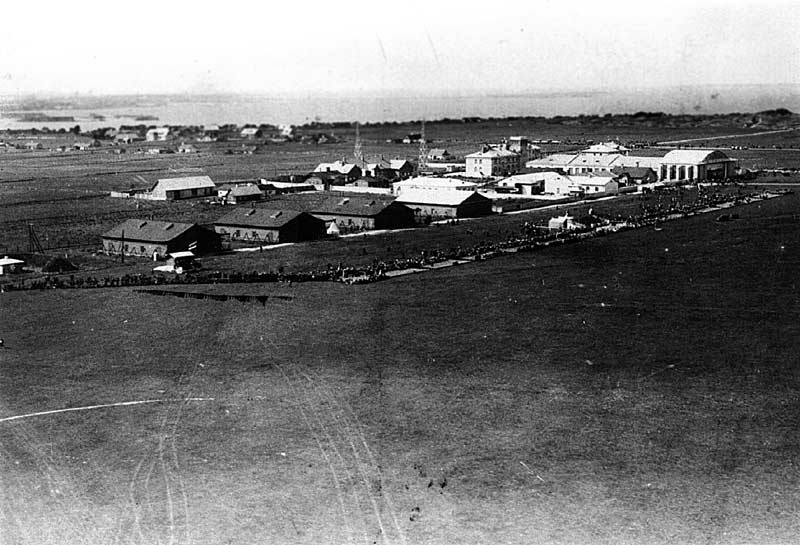
- Lasnamäe Airfield in 1933.
- IATA: none; ICAO: none

Summary
- Airport type: Military
- Operator: ~~Estonian Air Force~~, ~~Soviet Air Force~~
- Serves: Tallinn
- Location: Tallinn
- Elevation AMSL: 43 m / 141 ft
- Coordinates: 59°27′00″N 024°51′48″E

Map
- Location in Estonia

Runways
Direction	Length		Surface
Direction	m	ft	Surface
	~~2,500~~	~~8,202~~	~~Concrete~~

Lasnamäe Airfield (Estonian: Lasnamäe lennuväli) was an airfield in Tallinn, Estonia. It was located 5 km (3.1 mi) east of the city centre on the hill of Lasnamäe. Nowadays its former runway and taxiways are covered by apartment buildings and a street network. The newer Tallinn Airport is also located in Lasnamäe but 4.5 km (2.8 mi) south-southwest.

In 1924, the airfield was shortly taken over by communist rebels during the 1924 Estonian coup attempt.

In 1956, the 425th Fighter Aviation Regiment of the Soviet Air Defence Forces arrived from Siverskaya (Siverskiy), in Leningrad Oblast. It was equipped with Mikoyan-Gurevich MiG-15 and Mikoyan-Gurevich MiG-19 fighters. In 1970 the regiment moved to Haapsalu.

Due to the expansion of residential areas, flying operations stopped by 1982.
