= Bauska Airfield =

Former airport in Bauska, Latvia

- Bauska Lidlauks
- Near Bauska, Bauska Municipality in Latvia

Site information
- Type: Airfield
- Condition: Abandoned

Location
- Location in Latvia
- Coordinates: 56°24′22″N 24°12′32″E

Site history
- Built: 1935; 91 years ago
- Fate: Housing
- Battles/wars: World War II
- Events: 1936 Flight Around Latvia; 1937 Flight Around Latvia; 1938 Flight Around Latvia

Bauska Airfield was an airfield located near the town of Bauska, Bauska Municipality in Latvia. It was established in 1935 for sports recreation flying, and became a recurring waypoint for the Flight Around Latvia competition. During World War II in 1940, it was occupied by the Soviets, and then it was captured by the Germans in 1941. It was recaptured by the Soviets in 1944, and was used by the Soviet Air Forces.

== History ==
On 17 June 1935, an aero club was established and began funding the construction of a small sports field. Shortly afterwards, Bauska Airfield was established, and a hangar was installed in 1936. Throughout the 1930s, the airfield was used for sports recreational flying and aviation festivals. On 16 August 1936, an aviation festival was held, and pilots Muiznieks and Celmins tore the undercarriage off while landing a KOD-1 #11 at the airfield. On 27 September 1936, Bauska Airfield served as the fifth waypoint in the 1936 Flight Around Latvia competition. On 26 September 1937, the airfield served as a waypoint in the 1937 Flight Around Latvia competition. On 19 August 1938, an aviation festival was held. On 1 October 1938, the airfield served as the eight waypoint in the 1938 Flight Around Latvia Competition. During the event, a bullseye target was propped on the airfield, and participating aircraft were to drop markers over the airfield instead of landing. As it had clear approach and sight lines, many of the markers hit the target spot-on.

=== World War II ===
Bauska Airfields I, II, and III

On 17 June 1940, Bauska Airfield was occupied by the Soviets following the Soviet annexation of Latvia, ceasing civil aviation operations. On 1 March 1941, plans were drawn for the construction of a concrete runway at the airfield, and were approved on 24 March. On 1 June, the Soviets began the installation of a 2 km long runway using concrete plates measuring 1 x 1.5 meters. The size of the airfield was approximately 2 x 2 km. During Spring of 1941, hundreds of farmers amidst sowing season were recruited for the construction of the airfield, which in turn impacted the harvest as sowing work could not be done properly. Additionally, farmers were kept out of their properties, leaving livestock untended for. Workers brought to the construction site had to work from 7 am until 8 or 9 pm, and executive committees appointed special brigades as work supervisors.

However, the construction of these upgrades were not completed when the airfield was captured by German motorised units on 28 June 1941.Following capture, the Germans began facilitating the construction of an additional three airfields around Bauska. Labour work previously imposed by Soviets, brought morale among farmers in the parish low. Despite this, according to Bauskas Gazette, many had rejoiced after German troops occupied the area with the intentions of drawing out the Soviets. Bauska Airfield was known as Bauska I. In summer of 1944, Bauska I was upgraded for use as an operational airfield, and likely operated as a satellite for Bauska II. It had a natural surface landing ground measuring 1500 x 1500 meters. Bauska II was established, and was sporadically used by Luftwaffe aircraft between June and October 1944. Bauska III was established, and operated as a minor field airstrip. It was equipped with a natural surface landing ground measuring 3500 x 2000 meters. The last of the four, Bauska-Bornsmünde was established also as a minor field airstrip, equipped with a natural surface landing ground measuring 3500 x meters. Following a 6-week siege led by Soviet troops, the airfield was recaptured on 24 September 1944.

=== Post-war ===
After World War II, the Soviets reoccupied the Bauska Airfield and completed reconstruction. Afterwards, the airfield was used by the Soviet Air Forces. In November 1957, it was designated class 5, and operated as an auxiliary field for Spilve Airport at Riga. For ten days in June 1961, a gliding competition was held at Bauska Airfield organised by the DOSAAF. Twenty glider pilots from Jelgava, Liepāja, and Riga competed at the airfield for the title of winners in the Republican Technical Sports Spartakias, and were divided into two groups. During the free-distance flight, Riga pilot M. Stokis achieved a distance of 264 km, which became the new Latvian SSR republican record. The previous record was 86 km, and only results above 100 km were officially counted. Additionally, this was also achieved by Liepāja pilot Arnis Butmanis, who gained a distance of 150 km. On 12 June 1965, the Republican 10th Gliding Championship took place at Bauska Airfield. Participants of the event included 22 athletes from sports clubs in Jelgava, Riga, Liepāja, Daugavpils, and Bauska. First place was one by the team from Liepāja, while second and third went to both Riga teams. Fourth place went to the Bauska team. During the individual all-around competition, first place was won by Kadiķis and Stenclava.

=== Closure ===
Throughout the 1970s, operations at Bauska Airfield had shifted to model flying. Sometime in the 1980s, competitions involving model aviation had ceased at Bauska Airfield, and were moved to wider airfields with better advantages, subsequently abandoning the airfield. By December 1988, the former Bauska Airfield was used for storing sugar beet. This was done to alleviate logistical delays caused from peak beet harvesting season, which amounted 20,000 tons of roots accumulating in the fields. However, the solution was mostly temporary, applied only when unloading equipment at the Bauska receiving point failed due to technical malfunctions. As failures occurred frequently during the season, dump trucks without trailers commonly dumped sugar beets on the former airfield. In 1989, the Bauska District Executive Committee transferred the former airfield territory to the city council for redevelopment into housing and municipal facilities.
