= Lithuanian Air Lines =

National state-owned airline of Lithuania, operating in 1938–1940

Lithuanian Air Lines Lietuvos oro linijos
- Founded: 1938
- Commenced operations: September 1938
- Ceased operations: June 1940 (with the Soviet occupation of Lithuania)
- Hubs: Kaunas Aleksotas Airfield
- Focus cities: Palanga
- Destinations: 2
- Parent company: Directorate of Aerial Communication under the Ministry of Communication of Lithuania

Lithuanian Air Lines (Lithuanian: Lietuvos oro linijos) was a national state-owned airline of Lithuania, operating in 1938–1940. Its hub was in Kaunas Aleksotas (S. Darius and S. Girėnas) airport.

== Establishment ==
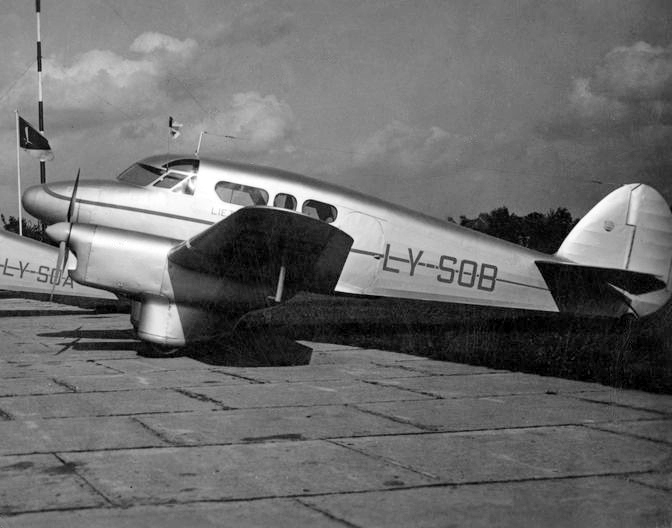
Percival Q.6 of Lithuanian Air Lines, Kaunas, 1939

The idea of Lithuanian national airline was first launched in spring of 1922. At least two companies – American Lithuanians' Trade Company (Lithuanian: Amerikos lietuvių prekybos bendrovė) and insurance company Lietuvos Lloydas submitted their proposals for the concession. Despite the first bidder had backing from Junkers and the second - from Sablatnig, the Lithuanian government did not follow the examples of neighbouring Latvia and Estonia, which facilitated the emergence of respectively Latvijas Gaisa Satiksmes Akciju Sabiedriba and Aeronaut. The main arguments behind such reluctance were the lack of personnel and airfields.

Air passenger services in Lithuania were launched in 1922 and until 1938 were provided exclusively by foreign airlines, flying mostly transit routes: Deruluft, Deutsche Luft-Reederei, Latvijas Gaisa Satiksmes Akciju Sabiedriba, Aeronaut, AB Aerotransport, Deutsche Luft Hansa, LOT.

The issues of national airline rose anew in 1933 after the tragic trans-Atlantic flight of Darius and Girėnas. In 1934 the Aeroclub of Lithuania requested the Ministry of Communications for financial assistance for domestic Kaunas-Klaipėda route to be served by a three-seater plane. As the idea was picked up by the press and the state-run news agency ELTA, the following year, 1935, witnessed an expanded suggestion by the Aero Club to establish air links with some important country centres as well. Then, an indirect support came from Latvia where a domestic air route Riga-Liepaja served by state owned Valsts gaisa satiksme was inaugurated on May 15, 1937. In 1934 the Inspectorate for Aerial Communication (Lithuanian: Orinio susisiekimo inspekcija) was established under the Ministry of Communication. One of its priorities was the establishment of national airline. Several routes were considered, including circular Kaunas–Klaipėda–Šiauliai–Kaunas service, connecting three largest cities of then Republic of Lithuania.

Lithuanian Air Lines was officially established on 20 September 1938 in Kaunas. The airline was established by the Inspectorate for Aerial Communication and the acquisition of the aircraft was funded by the Ministry of Communication. Jonas Dženkaitis and Simas Mockūnas both former military pilots, dismissed from the Air Force for participation in 1934 attempted coup, became the first pilots of the airline, and in 1937 were sent for training to Germany with Deutsche Luft Hansa.

The first revenue flight took place before the official establishment of the company, on 5 September 1938. Short operational season of 1938 (September 5–17) served only for test flights on Kaunas-Palanga route.

== Fleet ==
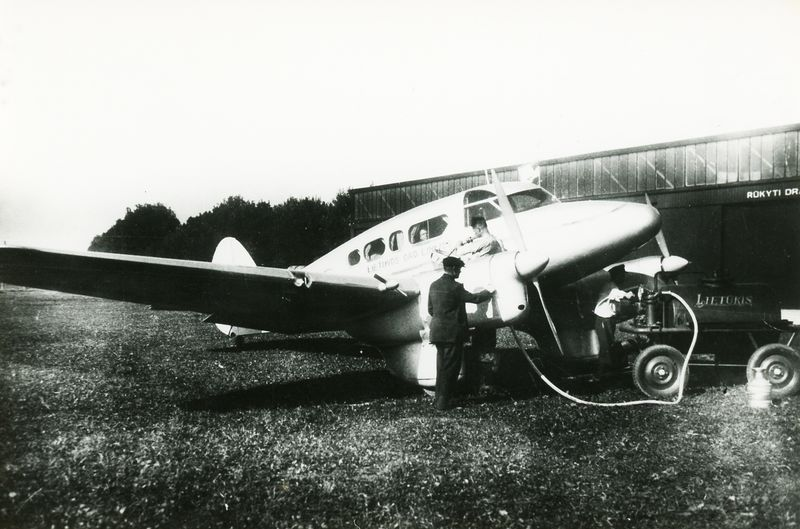
Refueling Lithuanian Air Lines Percival Q.6, Kaunas, 1939

Lithuanian Air Lines operated two twin-engine Percival Q.6 Petrel aircraft, carrying 6 (in some sources - 5) passengers. The choice of an aircraft was based on the data of Deutsche Luft Hansa, showing 40% passenger load factor for 8-10 seater passenger planes on domestic German flights.

The aircraft were registered as LY-SOA and LY-SOB and named after trans-Atlantic pilots, respectively Stepas Darius and Stasys Girėnas. The names were printed on the port side under cockpit's windows.

Aircraft were used for commercial services on Kaunas Aleksotas – Palanga route as well as for government services.

The aircraft were painted in overall aluminum dope livery with blue longitudinal line crossing the length of the fuselage. Company's name, plane's names and registration numbers were also in light blue.

== Operation ==
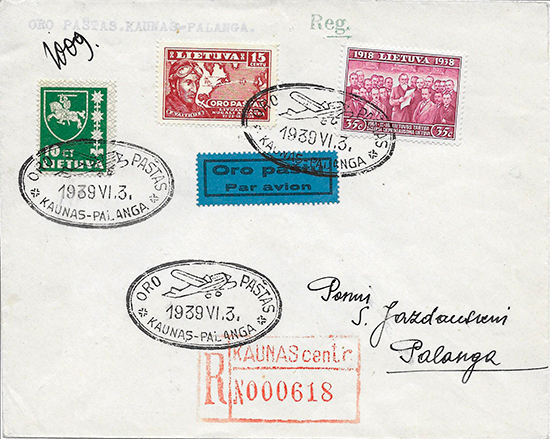
Air mail envelope No. 618, mailed with the first flight of Lithuanian Air Lines of 1939.

Lithuanian Air Lines operated only during the summer season, offering twice daily services on the 1 hour-long Kaunas-Palanga service. Initially planned service Kaunas-Klaipėda (Rumpiškės airfield) had to be cancelled in March 1939, due to annexation of Klaipėda by the Nazi Germany. Instead a flight was re-routed to popular coastal resort of Palanga.

After speedy improvements at Palanga airfield, which included building up a passenger terminal, office for airline staff and a radio station for communication with the planes in flight, the regular service on Kaunas–Palanga route was launched on 3 June 1939. The same year first international flight to Spilve airport in Riga (Latvia) was tested.

During 1938, a total of 34 revenue flights were made, 7,480 km flown, 31 passenger carried.

During 1939, a total of 216 flights were made, 764 passengers, 3,546 kg of baggage and 3,476 kg of mail were carried.

Post of Lithuania has introduced special stamp for the items mailed on the domestic air mail service; such numbered envelopes soon became numismatic rarity and an object of forgery.

== End of operation and legacy ==
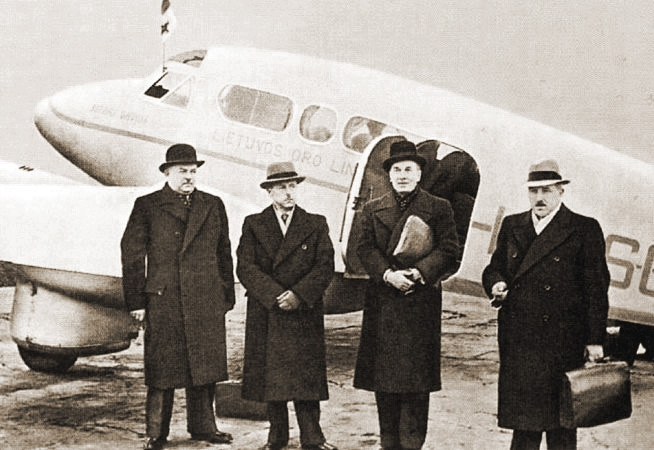
Lithuanian government delegation leaving to Moscow for negotiations, 1939

Activities the Lithuanian Air Lines were officially stopped on 16 June 1940, the day of Lithuania's occupation by the Soviet Union, when all flights, including civilian ones, were grounded by the order of the Soviet military.

After the formal annexation of Lithuania by the Soviet Union (3 August 1940), the aircraft of the former Lithuanian Air Lines were transferred to the Soviet airline Aeroflot. The latter employed both aircraft on the Riga-Velikye Luki and Riga-Moscow routes at least until mid-1941.

The second attempt to create national airline of Lithuania took place only in September 1991, when on the basis of nationalized Aeroflot section of Lithuania a state owned airlines Lithuanian Airlines (in Vilnius) and Air Lithuania (in Kaunas) were established.

== Literature ==
1. Duoniela, Vytautas (2016-12-31). "The First Flight KAUNAS – PALANGA, 1939". Lithuanian Philately. Retrieved 2021-02-02.
2. Lietuvos oro transportas, Visuotinė lietuvių enciklopedija, https://www.vle.lt/straipsnis/lietuvos-oro-transportas/ Retrieved 2021-02-02.
3. Peseckas, Vytautas, Orinis susisiekimas Nepriklausomoje Lietuvoje, Plieno Sparnai, https://www.plienosparnai.lt/page.php?282
4. "Prisimenant pirmuosius Lietuvos Oro linijų lėktuvus". technologijos.lt, http://www.technologijos.lt/n/technologijos/lektuvai_ir_aviacija/S-36666/straipsnis/Prisimenant-pirmuosius-Lietuvos-Oro-liniju-lektuvus-Foto Retrieved 2021-05-04.
