= Auce Airfield =

Auce Airfield
- Auce, Dobele Municipality in Latvia
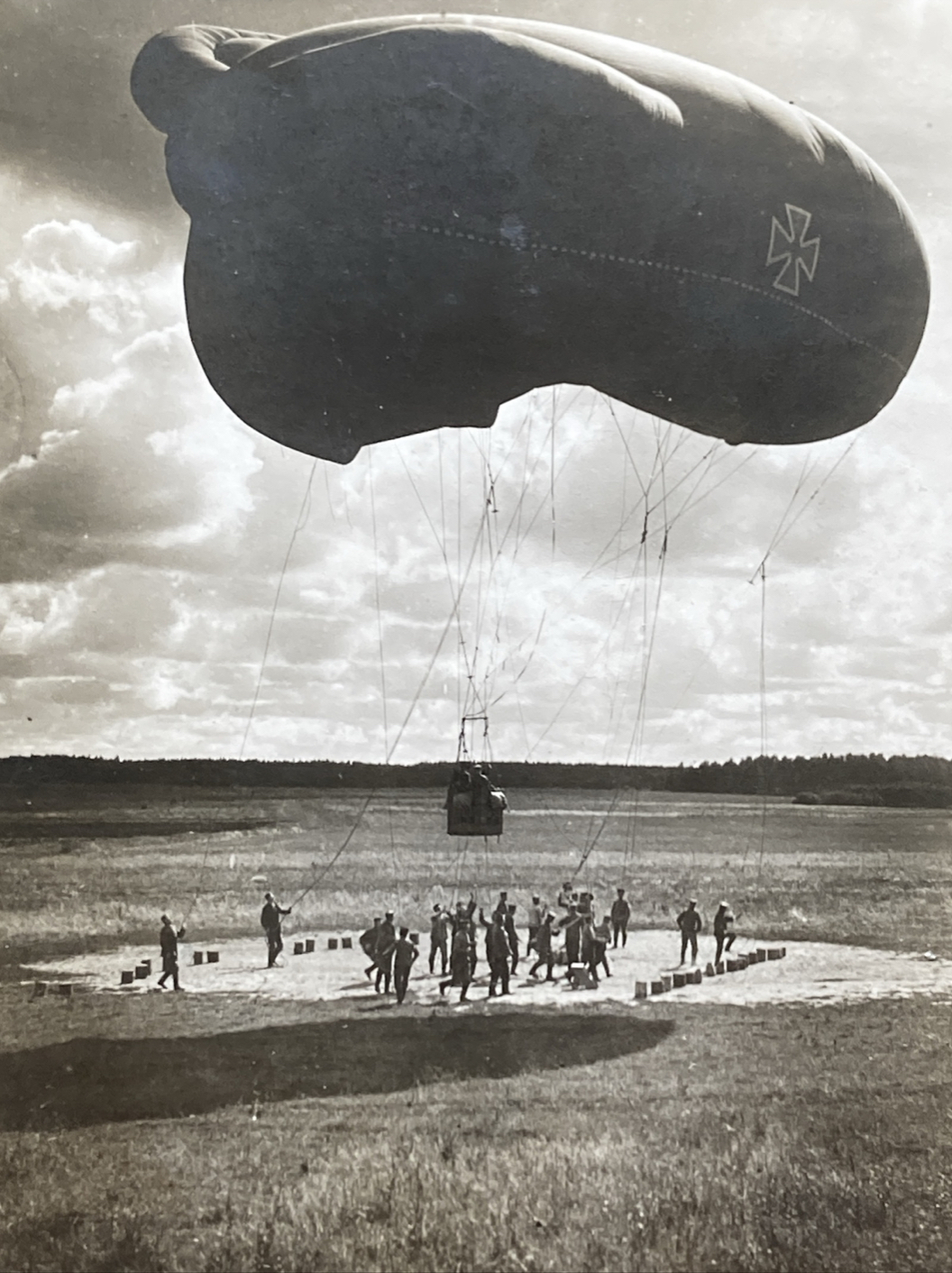
- Type Ae 800 Drachenballon at Alt-Auz Aerodrome in 1916

Site information
- Type: Military airfield
- Owner: Imperial German Army
- Operator: Luftstreitkräfte
- Condition: Abandoned

Location
- Location of Auce Airfield in Latvia
- Coordinates: 56°26′43″N 22°54′05″E

Site history
- Built: 1915
- Built by: Imperial German Army
- Materials: Grass
- Battles/wars: World War I
- Events: 1937 Flight Around Latvia

Garrison information
- Occupants: Artillerie-Fliegerschule Ost I (1915–1917); Riesenflugzeug-Abteilung 500 (1917); Riesenflugzeug-Abteilung 501 (1917)

Auce Airfield, also known as Alt-Auz, was an airfield located near the town of Auce, Dobele Municipality in Latvia. It was established by the Imperial German Army during World War I, and held heavy bomber squadrons of the Luftstreitkräfte to fly attacks on the Eastern Front.

== History ==
During World War I, Auce Airfield was established by the Imperial German Army in 1915, consisting of the Eastern Front artillery aviators’ school, and an adjoining grass airstrip. The Artillerie-Fliegerschule Ost I was based in the school from 1915 until 1917. It was known as "Alt-Autz" and "Alt-Auz" by the Germans. From the beginning of 1916, the airfield began front-line trialing Zeppelin-Staaken R.VI bomber units, remaining at the Eastern Front through mid-1917 for frontal testing. Following military trials in 1916 on the experiment heavy bomber DFW R.I, the R.I (R 11/15) was sent to Auce Airfield for deployment on the Eastern front from April to September 1917. It was under the Riesenflugzeug-Abteilung 500. Aircraft that commonly flew to Auce Airfield included the Zeppelin-Staaken VGO.III and Zeppelin-Staaken VGO.I. The airfield had a large hangar, for which the VGO.III was stored there during the summer of 1916, where it was inspected by VIPs. The bomber units that were based at Auce Airfield mainly flew night attacks, with the Zeppelin-Staaken R.VI carrying 770 kg (1,698 lb) bomb loads to the Eastern front.

=== Interwar and World War II ===
When World War I ended, Auce Airfield began operating as a civilian airfield throughout the interwar period. On 26 September, 1937, the airfield operated as the 7th stop for the second Flight Around Latvia competition. The event involved 6 KOD-1 aircraft, with the total distance covering 1129 kilometers. During World War II in 1941, Auce Airfield was occupied by the German Army, and was classified as a field airstrip (Feldflugplatz) on 15 June, 1941. It was never used by the Luftwaffe. In mid-1945, Auce Airfield was captured by Soviet forces, and was used as a forward operation base by the 15th Air Army Aviation Regiment in April 1945. The regiment flew bombing missions against German positions and airfields near Talsi using medium and light bombers. Following the end of World War II, the airfield remained unused and abandoned.

== Units ==
The following lists the units that were based in Auce at one point:

- Artillerie-Fliegerschule Ost I, 1915 - 1917
- Riesenflugzeug-Abteilung 500, Mid-1917 - August 1917
- Riesenflugzeug-Abteilung 501, Mid-1917

== Accidents & incidents ==
- On 24 January 1917, a Zeppelin-Staaken VGO.III was landing at Auce Airfield during a training flight when it got caught in a sudden downdraft, causing it to land short. The forward undercarriage struck an obstruction, causing the aircraft to break up. Fuel from ruptured lines sprayed onto the nose exhaust stacks, causing the wreck to catch fire, killing five crew members. This was the only VGO.III to be manufactured, and was also the first fatal accident involving an R-plane.

== See also ==
- Petersfelde Airfield
