= Petersfelde Airfield =

Former airfield in Dobele, Latvia

Petersfelde Airfield
- Dobele Municipality in Latvia
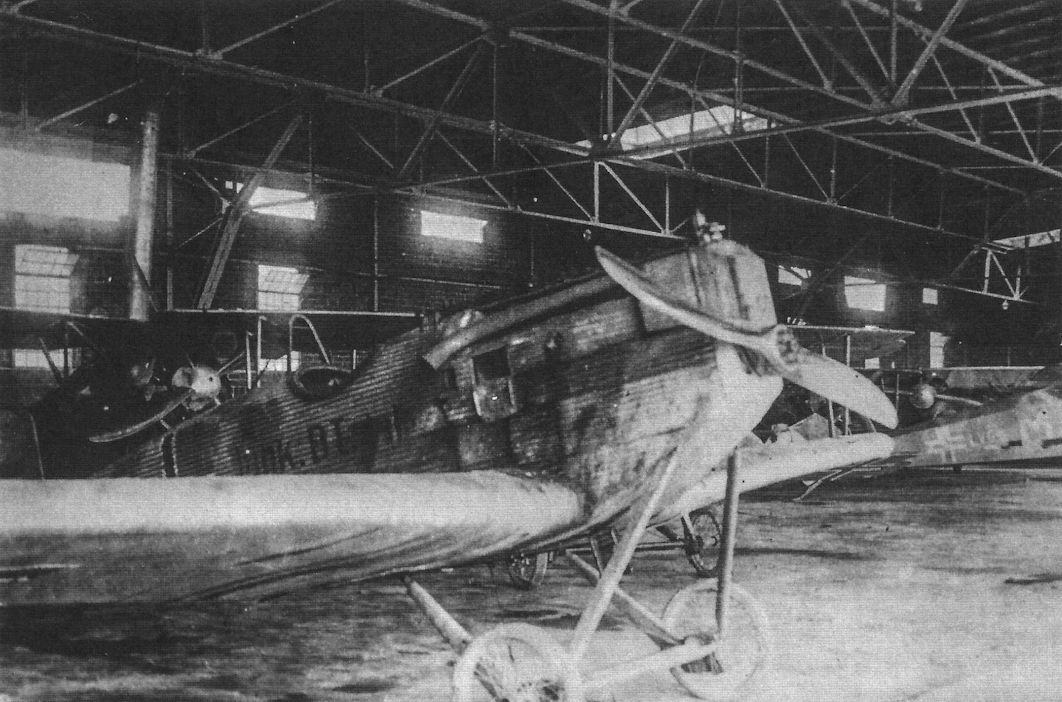
- Ex-Sachsenberg aircraft consisting of a Junkers D.I, two Siemens-Schuckert D.IV, an LVG C.VI, and two others stored at Petersfelde Airfield, 1919.

Site information
- Type: Military airfield
- Owner: Imperial German Army
- Condition: Abandoned

Site history
- Built: 1917
- Built by: Imperial German Army
- Materials: Grass
- Battles/wars: World War I

Garrison information
- Occupants: Kampfgeschwader Sachsenberg

Petersfelde Airfield was a military airfield in Dobele, southwest of Riga. It was established by the Imperial German Army in 1917 during World War I. During 1919, the airfield was used to house the Kampfgeschwader Sachsenberg, and it was later briefly used by the Latvian Air Force in late 1919.

== History ==
During World War I, the Imperial Germany Army established Petersfelde Airfield along with Artillerie-Fliegerschule Ost II in March 1917. It was primarily used by the Luftstreitkräfte. In late 1917, the Eastern Front concluded, and the Germans retreated from and abandoned the airfield, leaving behind several aircraft parts and materials. After abandonment, the parts were collected from the airfield and used to service a newly delivered Nievport 24 in Spilve Airport.

=== Post-war Bermontian conflicts ===
During April through October 1919, the airfield operated as the primary base of the LG Sachsenberg during the Bermontian conflicts, flying Halberstadt C.V aircraft. This led to multiple bad landings involving the Halberstadt. In Spring 1919, the Flieger-Abteilung 417 of the LG Sachsenberg arrived, flying Halberstadt C.V aircraft. As it was the end of winter, the ice had thawed and created unsuitable muddy landing conditions for aircraft. Shortly afterwards, the LG Sachsenberg was fully based at the airfield, flying Junkers D.I, Junkers CL.I, Fokker D.VII, Siemens-Schuckert D.IV, LVG C.VI, and the Albatros D.V. The Staffel Majewski of Sachsenberg was also stationed, with squadron identifiers V and M. In 1919, the pro-German West Russian Volunteer Army, led by Anatol von Lieven, based their aircraft at Petersfelde Airfield. On 9 May, 1919, pilots V. Jakubovs, J. Prieditis, and N. Puskelis left the airfield and flew over to the Latvian side in three single-seat Nieuport aircraft. Eventually, they became the first members of the newly established Latvian Air Force.

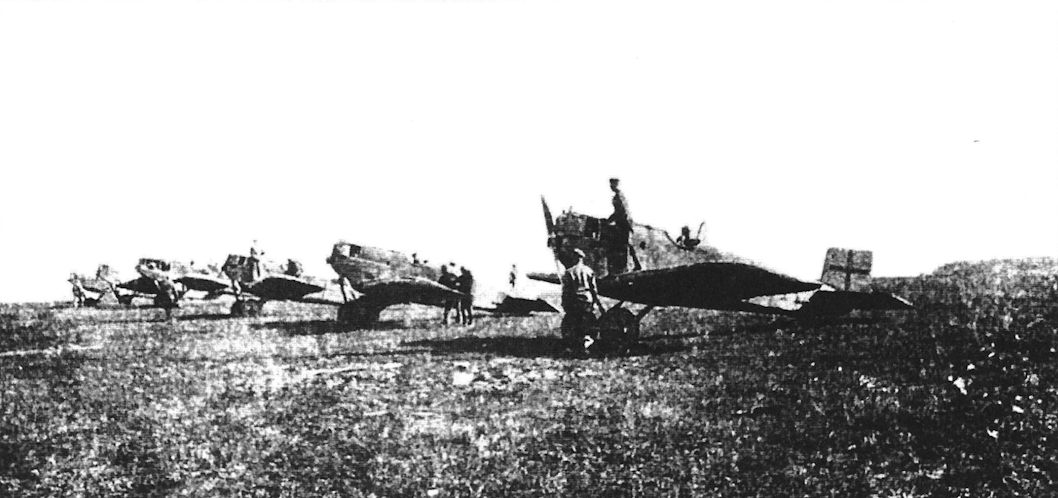
Lineup of Junkers D.Is at Petersfelde on 9 October, 1919, the day after Pavel Bermondt-Avalov launched an offensive on Riga.

=== Latvian Air Force ===
In late 1919, the Latvian Aviation Park took over control of Petersfelde Airfield from the Germans, and established the Third Aviation Department there. During 3-5 March, 1920, Captain J. Indāns left Riga to inventory the materials leftover by the Germans at the airfield. In July 1920, a proposal was made to convert the airfield into a base for the 3rd Squadron. Subsequently, in 18 July, 1920, 1st Lts. Jakubovs and Prieditis arrived to inspect the airfield and evaluate its suitability. Additionally, on 3 November, 1920, J. Rimsa was dispatched in a Sopwith Camel to the airfield to also evaluate its suitability for service. On 21 August, 1921, 1st Lt. Jevlampjevs was dispatched to Daugavpils to search for a replacement of the airfield, as it had become disused. During World War II, the airfield was not reactivated by the Germans.

== Units ==
The following units that were based in Petersfelde at one point:

Luftstreitkräfte

- Artillerie-Fliegerschule Ost II

Kampfgeschwader Sachsenberg

- Flieger-Abteilung 417, Spring 1919
- Staffel Majewski, Kampfgeschwader Sachsenberg
- Headquarters of Kampfgeschwader Sachsenberg

== Accidents & incidents ==
- In 1919, a Junkers CL.I "V" registered as 12921/18 crashed landed at Petersfelde. It likely experienced a ground loop, causing the front landing gear to collapse and tipping the aircraft onto its nose. Following German departure, it was acquired by the Latvian Air Force.
- In June 1919, a Junkers CL.I "M" crashed at Petersfelde Airfield. A photograph of the wreckage shows that the nose of the aircraft was torn off.

== See also ==
- Auce Airfield
