= Percival Petrel =

Q.6
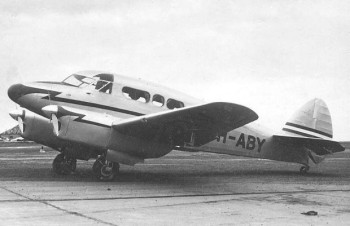

General information
- Type: Six-seat military communications aircraft, four- or six-seat civil feederliner
- Manufacturer: Percival Aircraft Ltd
- Designer: Edgar Percival
- Status: Retired
- Primary users: Royal Air Force Fleet Air Arm; Lithuania; Egypt
- Number built: 27

History
- Introduction date: 1938
- First flight: 14 September 1937

The Percival Q.6 was a 1930s British communications aircraft built by Percival Aircraft Limited at Luton. Originally, the Percival Q.6 was a civil transport but It was used during the Second World War by the Royal Air Force and Royal Navy as a communications and liaison aircraft. It was a twin-engine, low-wing monoplane with a tailwheel undercarriage.

== Design and development ==
The Percival Type-Q was Percival's first twin-engine aircraft. It was constructed of wood, with plywood and fabric covering. It had a fixed, tailwheel undercarriage, with faired mainwheels, although four of the production machines would be equipped with retractable undercarriage.

Two versions were designed: the Q.4, a four-seat executive transport, and the Q.6, a six-seat feederliner. The Q.4 was not built. The prototype Q.6, registration G-AEYE, first flew on 14 September 1937 at Luton Airport. Production started in 1938, and the first production aircraft, registered G-AFFD, was delivered to Sir Philip Sassoon on 2 March 1938.

== Operational history ==
A small number were exported, including one to the King Ghazi I of Iraq, two to the Lithuanian Ministry of Communications, one to the Australian Civil Aviation Board and two to the Egyptian government in military camouflage. A total of 27 aircraft were built (one prototype and 26 production aircraft).

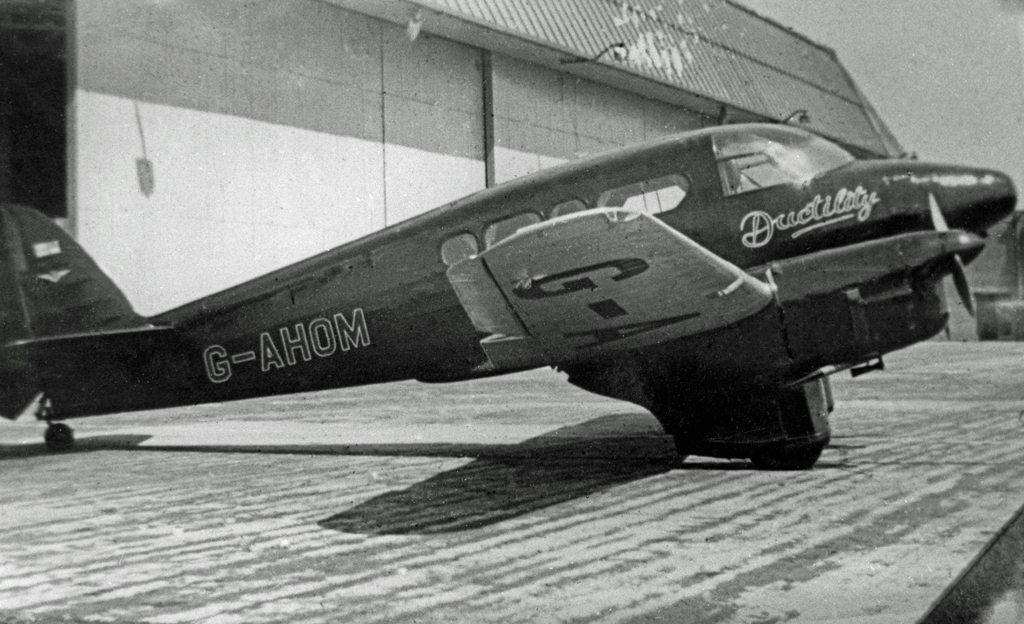
Ex RAF Petrel operated in the UK in 1949 by Ductile Steels as an executive transport

The Royal Air Force bought seven aircraft for communications duties under Air Ministry Specification 25/38; these were unofficially named Petrel. The Egyptian government bought two Q.6s.

In the early months of the Second World War, most of the civil Q.6s were requisitioned for service with the RAF and RN. Two Q.6s of the Lithuanian Air Lines were impressed by the Soviet Air Forces in 1940 and used with Soviet airline Aeroflot on Riga-Velikye Luki or Riga-Moscow lines.

With one exception, all the civilian Q.6s served with the Royal Air Force during the Second World War. Between 1946 and 1947, four requisitioned Q.6s and three Petrels were sold to civilian buyers. These were operated by small UK airlines, as executive transports and flown by private pilot owners.

== Variants ==
Q.4
Four-seat civil executive transport, none built.
Q.6
Six-seat civil feederliner.
Q.6 Mk I
Prototype fitted with wings intended for the Q.4 variant, one built.
Q.6 Mk II
Production variant with fixed landing gear, 12 built.
Q.6 Mk III
Variant with retractable landing gear. four built and one conversion from Mk II.
Q.6 Mk IV
Proposed air survey variant, not built.
Q.6 Mk V
Variant for military communications with a toilet, four passenger seats, nine-built.
Petrel
Name given to Q.6 Mk V military communications aircraft.

== Operators ==
=== Civilian operators ===
Australia
France
British India
Iraq

- King Ghazi I
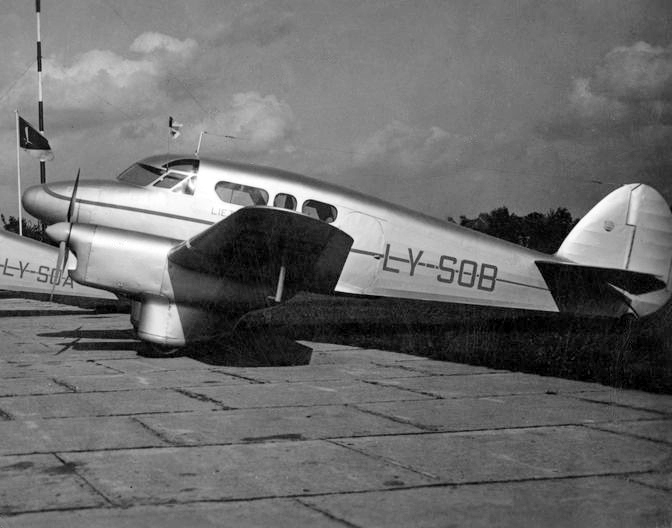
- Percival Q.6 of Lithuanian Air Lines, 1939, Kaunas
  Iraqi State Railways

Lithuania

- Lithuanian Air Lines

United Kingdom

- Starways
- Western Airways

The aircraft was also operated by flying clubs, companies and private individuals.

Soviet Union

- Aeroflot in 1940-1941 operated two aircraft captured in June 1940 from Lithuanian Air Lines following the Occupation of the Baltic states.

=== Military operators ===
Egypt

- Royal Egyptian Air Force, two aircraft used by the Royal Flight

Iraq

- Royal Iraqi Air Force, one aircraft acquired in 1939

United Kingdom

- Royal Air Force
  - No. 24 Squadron RAF
  - No. 173 Squadron RAF
  - No. 267 Squadron RAF
  - No. 510 Squadron RAF
- Fleet Air Arm

== Surviving aircraft ==
One Q.6, the first production registered G-AFFD, is still current on the United Kingdom Civil Aircraft Register but with an expired certificate of airworthiness. Currently being stored at Seething Airfield, Norwich, Norfolk. Under restoration to flight condition. This aircraft is believed to be the only remaining example of the aircraft type.

== Specifications (Percival Q.6 Petrel) ==
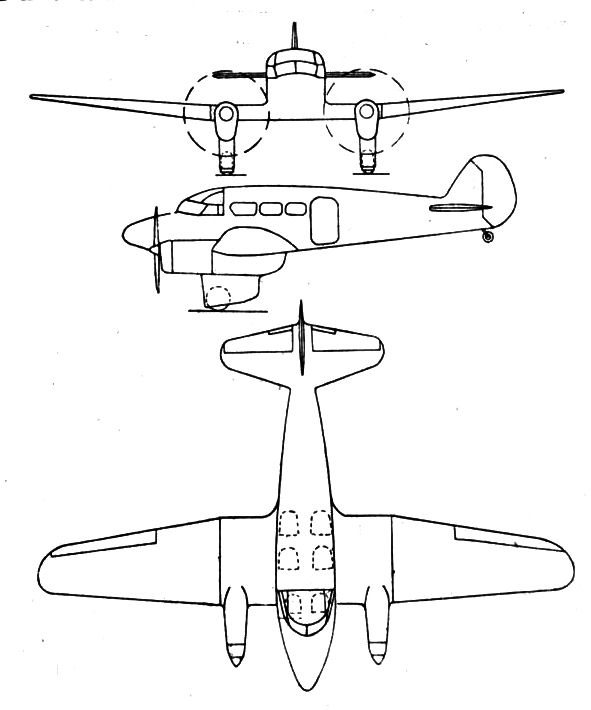
Percival Q.4 3-view L'Aerophile January 1938

Data from Jane's All the World's Aircraft 1938, The Hamlyn Concise Guide to British Aircraft of World War II

General characteristics

- Crew: 2
- Capacity: 4-6 passengers
- Length: 32 ft 3 in (9.83 m)
- Wingspan: 46 ft 8 in (14.22 m)
- Height: 9 ft 9 in (2.97 m)
- Wing area: 278 sq ft (25.8 m^{2})
- Empty weight: 3,500 lb (1,588 kg)
- Gross weight: 5,500 lb (2,495 kg)
- Powerplant: 2 × de Havilland Gipsy Six II 6-cylinder air-cooled inverted in-line piston engines, 205 hp (153 kW) each
- Propellers: de Havilland Propellers controllable-pitch propellers

Performance

- Maximum speed: 195 mph (314 km/h, 169 kn) at sea level
- Cruise speed: 181 mph (291 km/h, 157 kn) at 7,000 ft (2,100 m) with retractable undercarriage

172 mph (149 kn; 277 km/h) at 7,000 ft (2,100 m) with fixed undercarriage

- Landing speed: 58 mph (50 kn; 93 km/h) with flaps extended
- Range: 700–750 mi (1,130–1,210 km, 610–650 nmi)
- Endurance: 4 hours at cruise
- Service ceiling: 21,000 ft (6,400 m)
- Rate of climb: 1,150 ft/min (5.8 m/s)
- Absolute ceiling on one engine: 6,500 ft (2,000 m)
- Wing loading: 19.8 lb/sq ft (97 kg/m^{2})
- Power/mass: 0.075 hp/lb (0.123 kW/kg)

== See also ==
Aircraft of comparable role, configuration, and era

- Airspeed Envoy

Related lists

- List of aircraft of the Fleet Air Arm
- List of aircraft of the Royal Air Force
- List of aircraft of World War II
