= Starways =

British airline

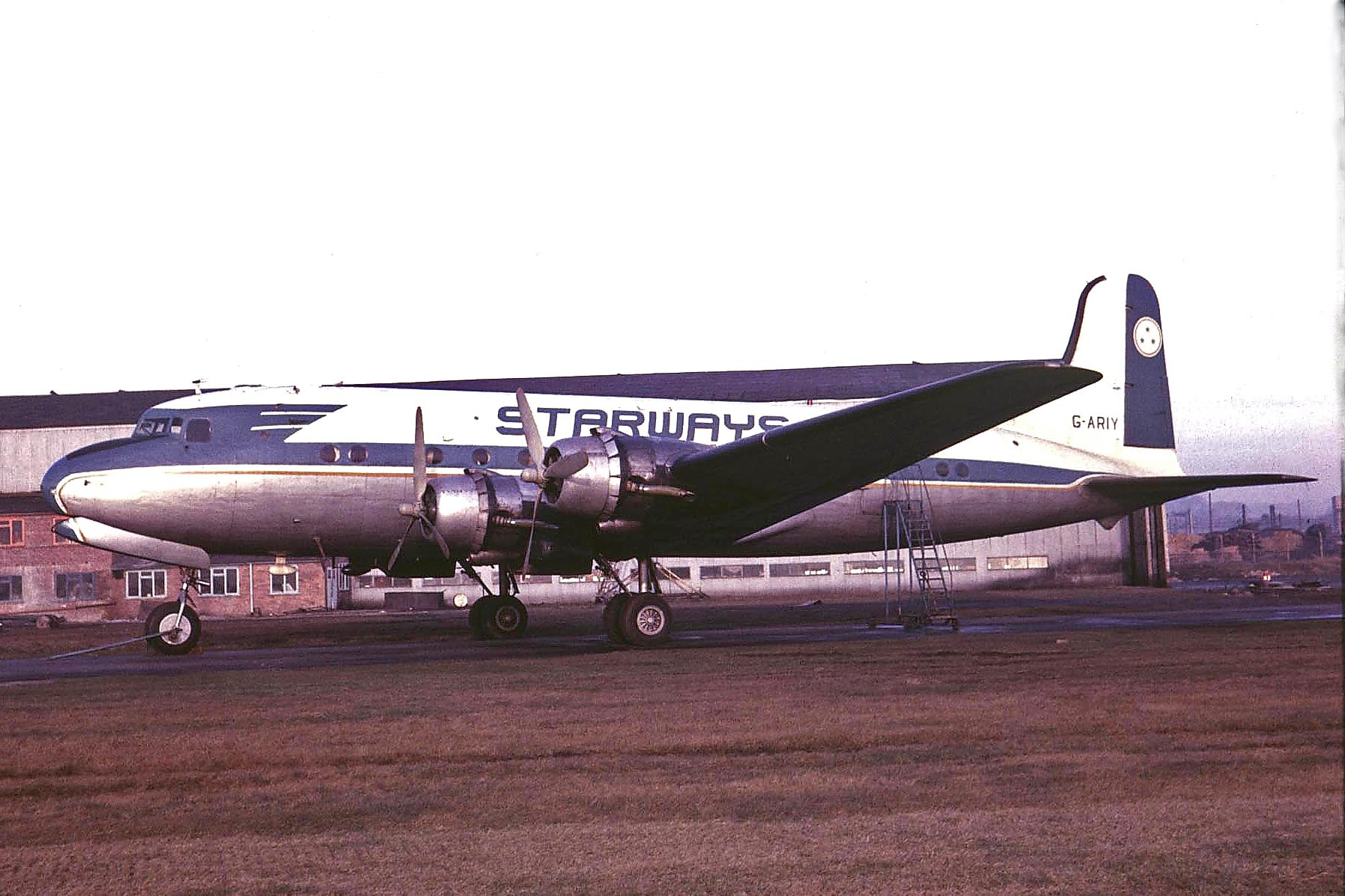
- Douglas DC-4 in early January 1964
- Founded: 7 December 1948
- Commenced operations: January 1949
- Ceased operations: 31 December 1963 (scheduled operations transferred to British Eagle International Airlines)
- Hubs: Liverpool (Speke) Airport
- Parent company: British Eagle International Airlines from December 1963
- Key people: F.H.Wilson, J.A.Wilson

Starways Ltd. was a charter and later scheduled British airline which operated from 1949 until 1964. The company offered freight transport, passenger charter services and serviced internal and international scheduled routes. It was acquired by British Eagle International Airlines in late 1963 and renamed British Eagle (Liverpool) in the following year.

== History ==
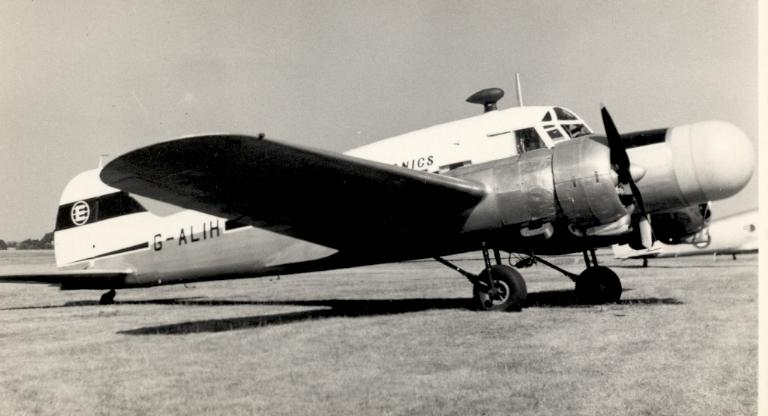
One of two original Avro Ansons

The airline was formed at Blackpool in 1948 by two pilots, Noel Rodnight and Albert Dean, to operate a charter service using a Percival Petrel for celebrities appearing in the Blackpool shows. The company started operations from Blackpool Airport in January 1949 with the Petrel. In May 1950 the Petrel was destroyed in an accident and replaced with an Avro Anson. In 1950 the business was relocated to Liverpool (Speke) Airport and F.H. Wilson & J.A. Wilson joined the company as executives. As well as joyriding flights the fleet now included two more twin-engined Avro Ansons to operate newspaper and freight flights including for one season a regular service between Liverpool and London.

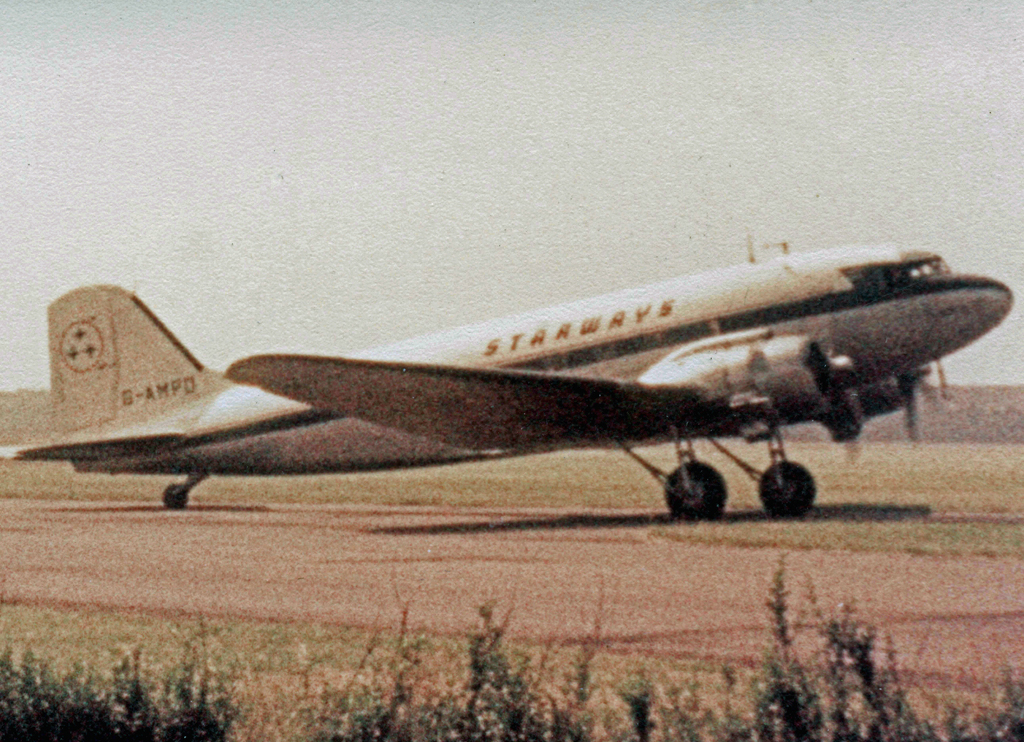
Douglas DC-3 in very basic colors in June 1953

The Wilson family were successful businessmen in Liverpool owning Limocoat Ltd. and later the Famous Army Stores. They were also involved with the Cathedral Touring Agency (CTA), a travel company, which provided most all-inclusive, tour business for the airline. In 1951, F.H. Wilson was appointed chairman of the board and by 1954 the family had acquired full control of the company. In the early fifties, the airline expanded, acquiring a number of Douglas DC-3s, including two prewar-built examples. This expansion was to operate seasonal tourist charters and build-up a network of summer scheduled services from Liverpool including flights to continental European destinations including Lourdes and Biarritz. In March 1955 Starways achieved its goal of opening a prestige scheduled route between Liverpool and London-Heathrow, flown several times weekly by DC 3. With work increasing all the time larger equipment was needed and thus the air carrier took delivery of two Douglas DC-4s Skymasters during the winter of 1957/58.

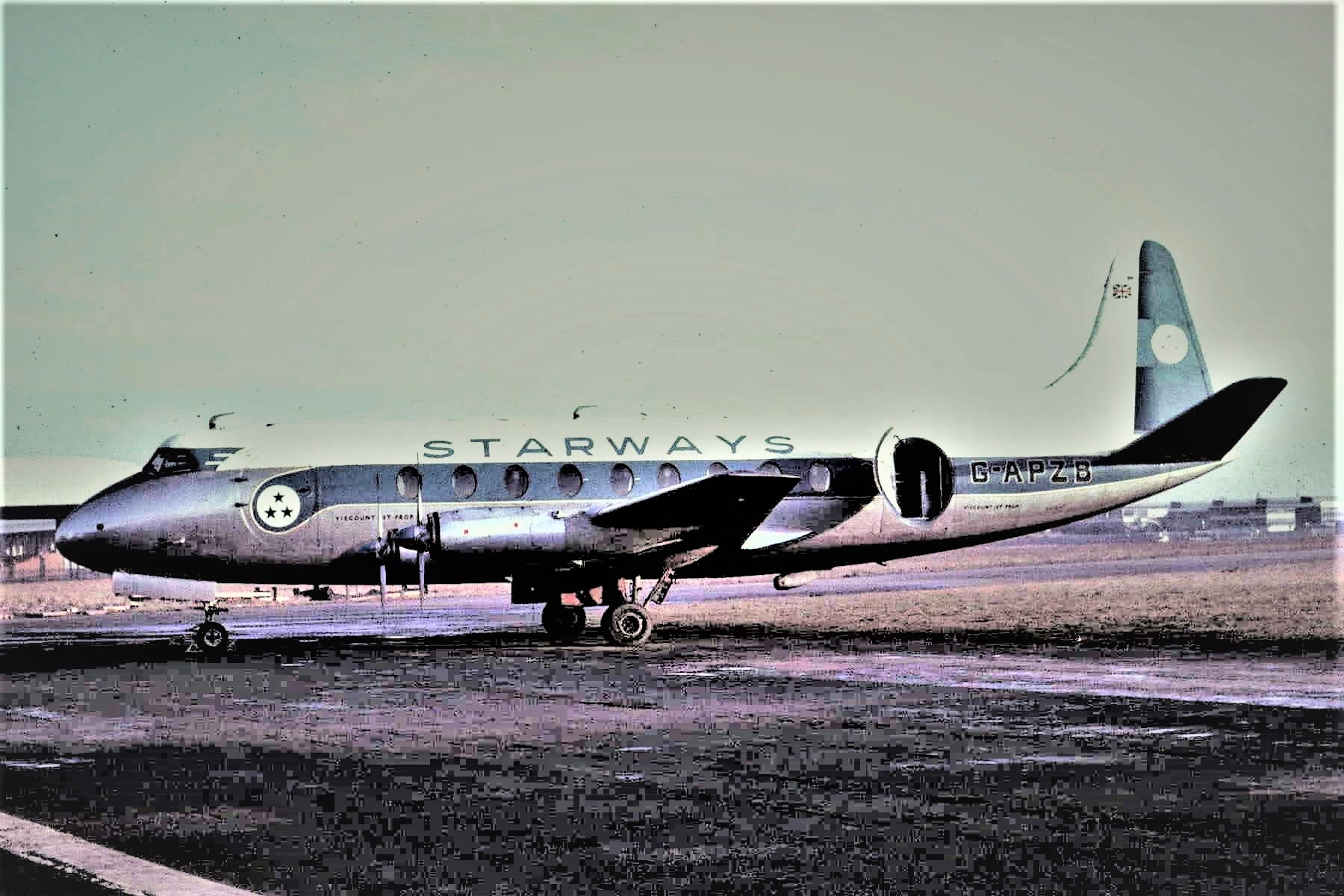
Vickers Viscount 700 in 1964

In 1957 the airline purchased the larger four-engined Douglas DC-4 with four further examples being acquired between March 1960 and January 1963. The first DC-4 charter was flown on 8 January 1958 between Liverpool and Southend Airport with football supporters. The Skymasters and DC-3s were also used on scheduled services from Liverpool to London Heathrow and from Liverpool and Manchester to Newquay in Cornwall.

In February 1961 the airline introduced the turbo-prop Vickers Viscount aircraft for use on inclusive tour flights and schedules to London Heathrow. The refined livery of the first aircraft (G-ARIR), particularly the roundel near the nose, hinted at its previous owner, (Air France).

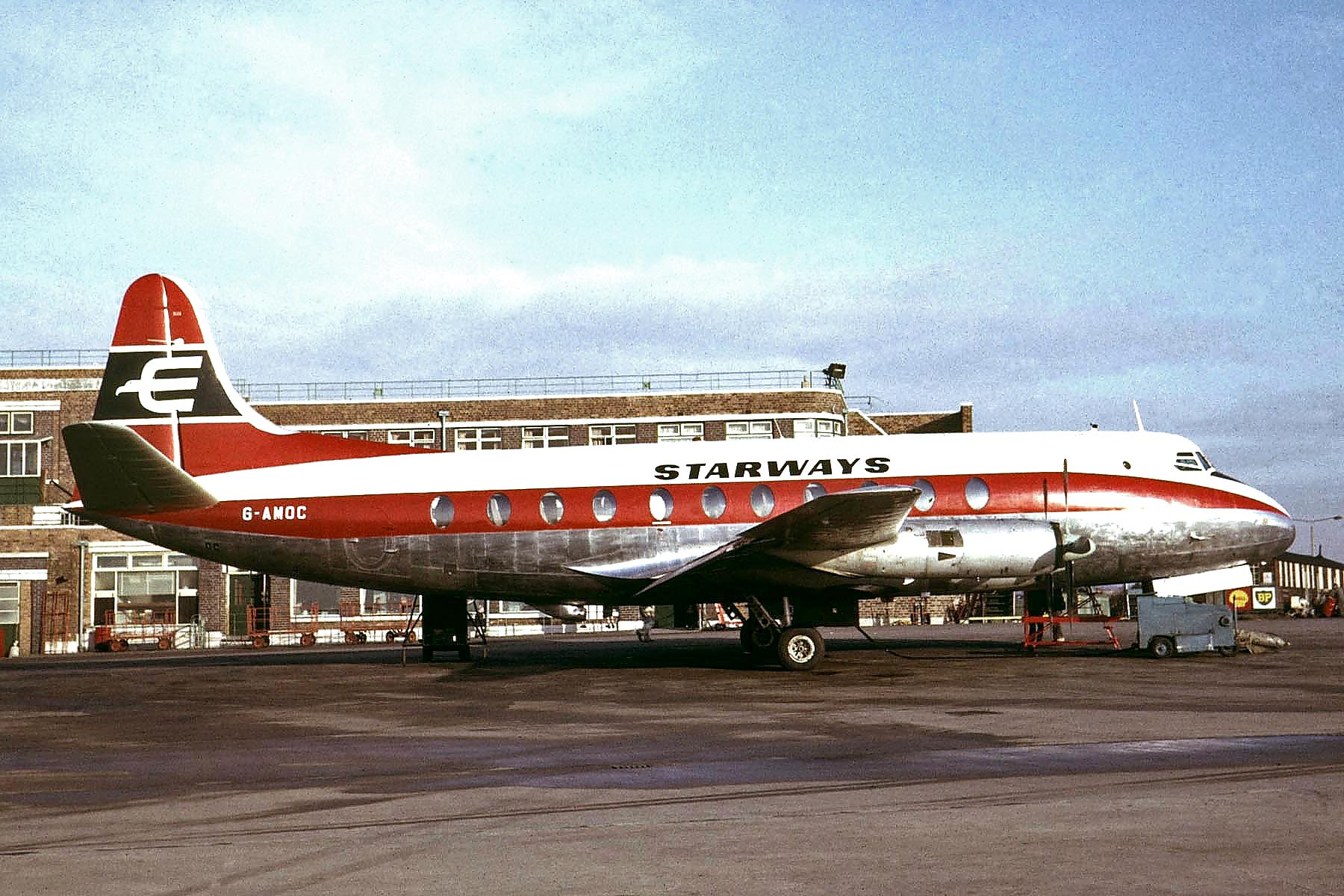
British Eagle Vickers Viscount 700 with Starways titles

In November 1963, Starways negotiated a co-operative agreement with British Eagle. The final Starways flight landed at Liverpool on 31 December 1963, the next day British Eagle took over all routes Due to delays in the transfer of route registration, British Eagle were obliged to operate routes in the name of Starways requiring two of their own red, liveried Viscount aircraft to be branded Starways. In September 1964 what had been the operating part of Starways became British Eagle (Liverpool) Ltd.

However, ownership of the fleet, aircraft hangars, parts inventory and other assets remained with the Starways directors who continued in business as Aviation Overhauls. This new company provided a variety of maintenance and support services until in 1969, all aircraft had been sold and the company closed.

== Aircraft operated ==
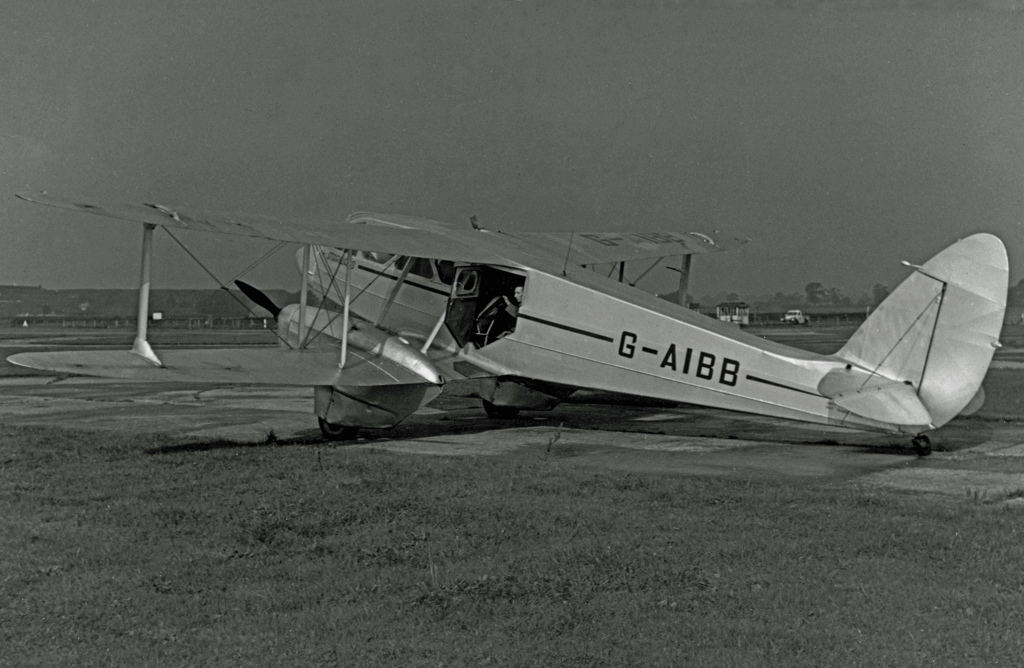
De Havilland Dragon Rapide in 1952

- 1 x Auster 5 - 1950–1950
- 2 x Avro Anson 652A 1 1949–1952
- 2 x Avro 19 series 2 - 1950–1951
- 1 x De Havilland Dragon Rapide - 1951–1953
- 7 x Douglas DC-3 - 1950-1955 1 leased in; 3 never entered service
- 7 x Douglas DC-4 - 1957-1964 1 leased in
- 1 x Miles M65 Gemini 1A - 1950-1952
- 1 x M.11A Whitney Straight 1951-1954
- 1 x Percival P16 Q6 Petrel 1949-1949
- 2 x Vickers Viscount 700 1961-1964

== Accidents and incidents ==
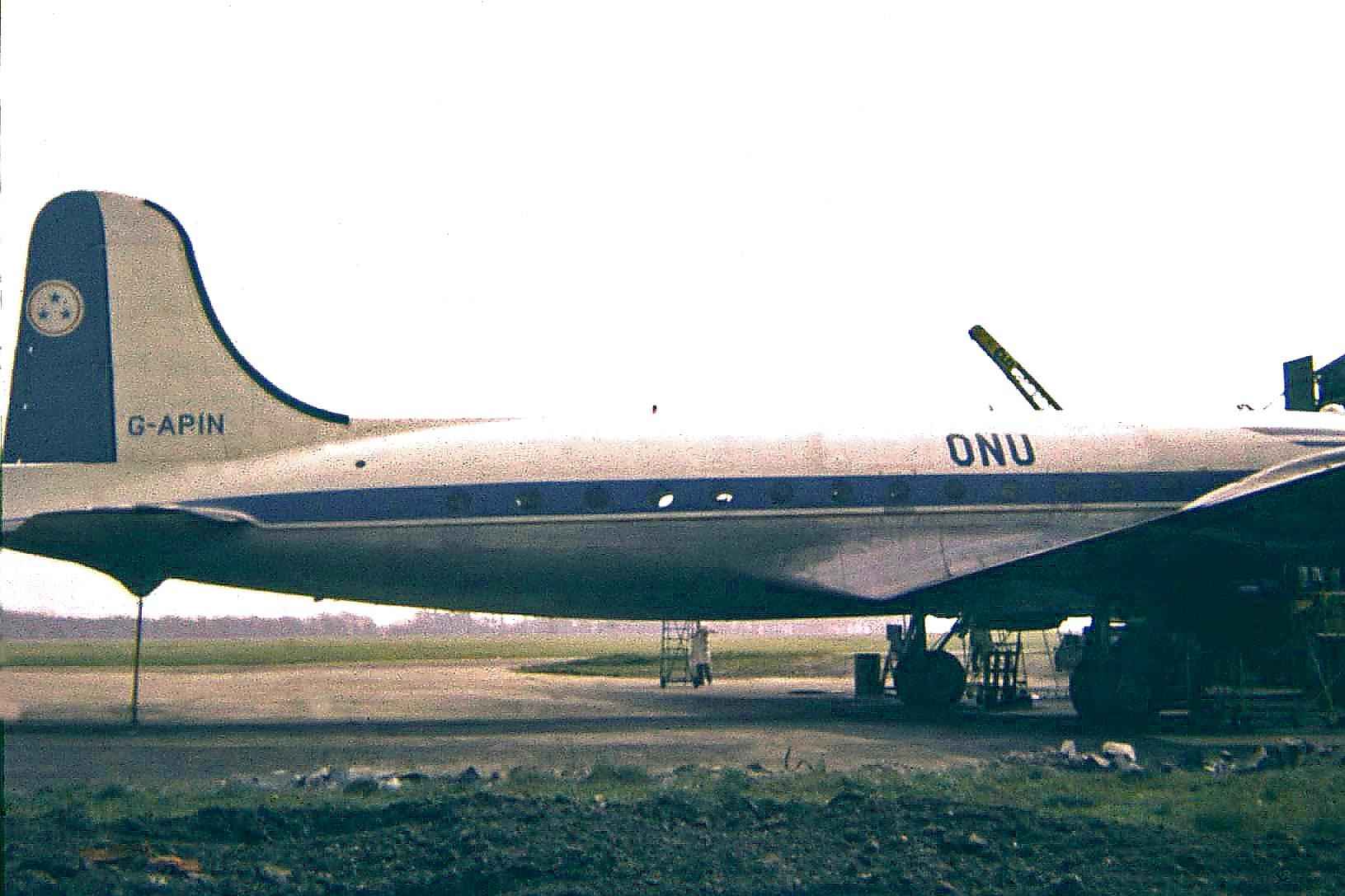
Douglas DC-4 G-APIN wearing ONU titles in Congo

1. 6 May 1949 - Starways first aircraft, a Percival P.16 Petrel, destroyed after crashing at BroomHall airfield, Pwllheli
2. 28 March 1956: Douglas DC-3 (registered G-AMRB) was on a positioning flight from Liverpool to Glasgow in readiness for a charter the next day to Lourdes. While on approach to Glasgow Renfrew Airport, the aircraft struck a hill at Largs (Ayrshire), cause reported as pilot error. No passengers were carried and one of the three crew died.
3. 19 June 1961 - Douglas DC-4 (registered G-ARJY), crashed after overshooting the runway at Dublin-Collingstown airport. On approach, the plane suddenly veered to the left, skidding along the ground to end up straddling the main road to Belfast. Heavy rain on the night was blamed for the accident. On board were 4 crew and 64 passengers travelling from Tarbes to Dublin. No one was hurt, but the aircraft was damaged beyond economical repair. The lack of casualties was attributed to the quantity of Holy Water being carried by pilgrims returning from Lourdes. Pathé News filmed the investigators attending the crash site.
4. 17 September 1961 - Douglas DC-4 (registered G-APIN) destroyed on the ground of Kamina airport by outlaw Katangan fighter-aircraft. The DC 4 was on loan to the United Nations (ONU) during the Congo Crisis as a troop carrier.
