= Valsts gaisa satiksme =

Latvian airline, 1937–1940

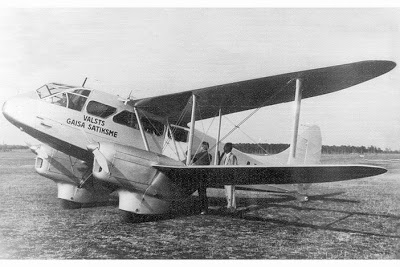
De Havilland 89 of Valsts Gaisa Satiksme

Valsts gaisa satiksme ("State Aerial Communication") was a state-owned national airline of Latvia, which operated between 1937 and 1940. Its hub was Spilve airport, in Riga, Latvia.

== Establishment ==
The first flight of Valsts Gaisa Satiksme took place on a route from Riga to Liepaja on June 15, 1937. One-way ticket price was set at 14.5 Ls. The route was served only in summer time, with the last flight scheduled on October 15. Initially this route was planned as a Riga-Ventspils-Liepaja service.

In 1938 and 1939 summer services on the Riga-Liepaja route were continued.

For 1939, the launch of a Riga-Krustpils-Daugavpils route was planned, but those plans were not implemented.

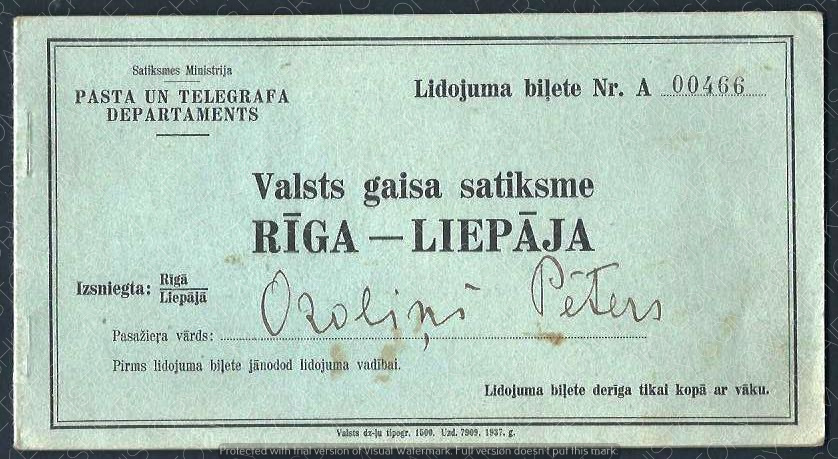
Ticket of Valsts gaisa satiksme

The airline used two seven-seat de Havilland DH.89 Dragon Rapide aircraft. The livery was silver with the company's name printed in black on the side of the pilots' cabin.

== Closure ==
The airline services were discontinued with the occupation of Latvia by the Soviet Union in June 1940 and the grounding of all Latvian aircraft by the order of the Soviet authorities on June 17, 1940.

The Soviet occupying authorities transferred the aircraft of Valsts Gaisa Satiksme to the Soviet airline Aeroflot.
