= Flight Around Latvia =

Former air racing event held in Latvia

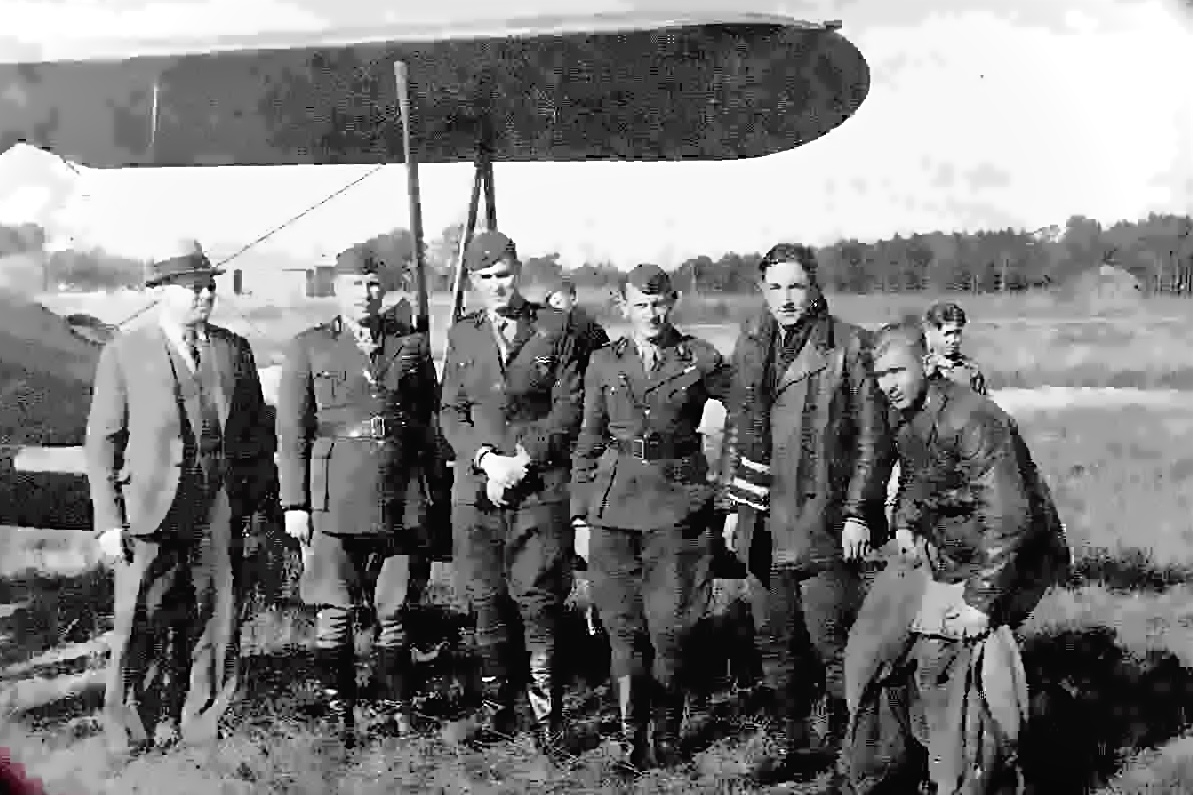
- Airmen posing for a photograph at the third Flight Around Latvia competition, 1–2 October 1938.

Tournament information
- Sport: Air racing
- Location: Latvia
- Dates: 26–28 September
- Established: 1936
- Defunct: 1938
- Number of tournaments: 3
- Format: Cross-country

Flight Around Latvia was a national air racing competition in Latvia. It was held yearly by the Civil Aviation Commission between 1936 and 1938, with participants graded on the accuracy and consistency of landing manoeuvres, aircraft speed, and marker dropping on bullseye targets.

== History ==
In 1930, Colonel Jānis Indāns, with Admiral Vltn. Putnins, carried out the first flight around Latvia. The total length of the route was 1,800 km, taking 9 hours and 35 minutes of flight time, landing at Liepāja and Daugavpils along the way.

The first Flight Around Latvia was held in 1934. The events demonstrated pilot skills in cross-country navigation and encouraged domestic aviation industry. Furthermore, the event was supported by Latvian aircraft manufacturers Valsts Elektrotehniskä Fabrika (VEF) and Kara Ostas Darbnīcas (KOD), as the event allowed them to test their aircraft. Airmen often prioritised steady fuel consumption and reliability rather than absolute speed. During every event, airmen would have to pass through a specified route, usually along existing airfields. Each airfields provided refuelling and telephone services to participating airmen. Along each routes, guards observed the competition to aid and report incidents, and also greeted airmen that arrived at an airfield.

In September 1936, the Flight Around Latvia competitions were officiated by the Civil Aviation Commission, and were organised by Civil Aviation Inspector Colonel J. Indāns. The commission composed of Civil Aviation Inspectorate Staff Viin. Grezis, Vltn. Graudiņš from the Latvian Aero Club, and Vltn. Timmermanis from the Aviation Regiment. Each competition flights started and ended at Spilve Airport in Riga, and were under civil aviation regulations, and was regarded as the first test for new young pilots. The rapid construction of aerodromes which included those in Liepāja, Tukums, Bauska, Kuldīga, and Ventspils helped facilitate the success of the event, as it required a large number of such. Winners were often awarded cups and valuable prizes by the Minister of War, General Inspector Colonel J. Indāns, the State Electrotechnical Factory, and the Liepāja Naval Port Workshops.

== Competitions ==
=== 1934 ===
In October 1934, the Aviation Promotion Society selected the route where airmen would have to participate. The route began at Riga, and passed through each aerodrome at Aizpute, Liepaja, Ventspil, paired with Cape Kolka lighthouse and Ru-no island to Rūjiene, Valmiera, Lejasciems, Jaun-latgale, Rēzekne, Daugavpils, Krustpils, Bauska, Jelgava, ending back at Riga.

=== 1936 ===
In 1936, the Civil Aviation Commission selected a route that began at Riga, passing through Tukums, Stende, Lake Usma to Ventspils, Kuldiga, and Liepaja. It then went along a course parallel to the Latvia-Lithuania border, flying south of Audi and Jelgava before the next stop at Basuka. The route continued to Daugava River and Krustpils, Daugavpils, Salaspils, Incukalns, Sigulda, Cesis, Valmiera, ending back at Riga. This would have served as the first official Flight Around Latvia competition. On 27 September 1936, the race was held with four participating aircraft. Beginning on a rainy day, the aircraft reached their first waypoint at Tukums where it had cleared up to fair-weather conditions and a couple hundred of spectators awaited their arrival. The participants arrived at Krustpils Airfield to stay for the night, and Colonel J. Indāns had flown from Riga to present the opening of the second day's flights. Aizargi pilot Toms Gailitis and his observer and squadron commander, Reinholds Celmins took first place after a rough landing at Spilve Airfield, scoring 235 points. They received 100 lats from the Monterey prize donated by Minister of War General J. Baložs, as well as the right to the silver cup donated to the Latvian Aero Club until the next competition. Aizsargi pilot K. Teichmanis and his observer K. Lešinski came second place after scoring 219.1 points, receiving 75 lats from the Minister of War's monetary prize. Third place was awarded to R. Dzeni and his observer J. Kukurs after scoring 159.3 points, receiving 50 lats from the monetary prize. Additionally, each participant received 25 lats from the 200-lat sum donated by the Riga Discount Bank. The participants of the event were N. Bulmanis, R. Celmins, R. Dzenis, T. Gailitis, N. Geizelis, A. Graudins, P. Greizis, R. Gulbis, J. Indans, R. Jenkevics, K. Lesinskis, J. Lindbergs, and K. Teikmanis.

=== 1937 ===
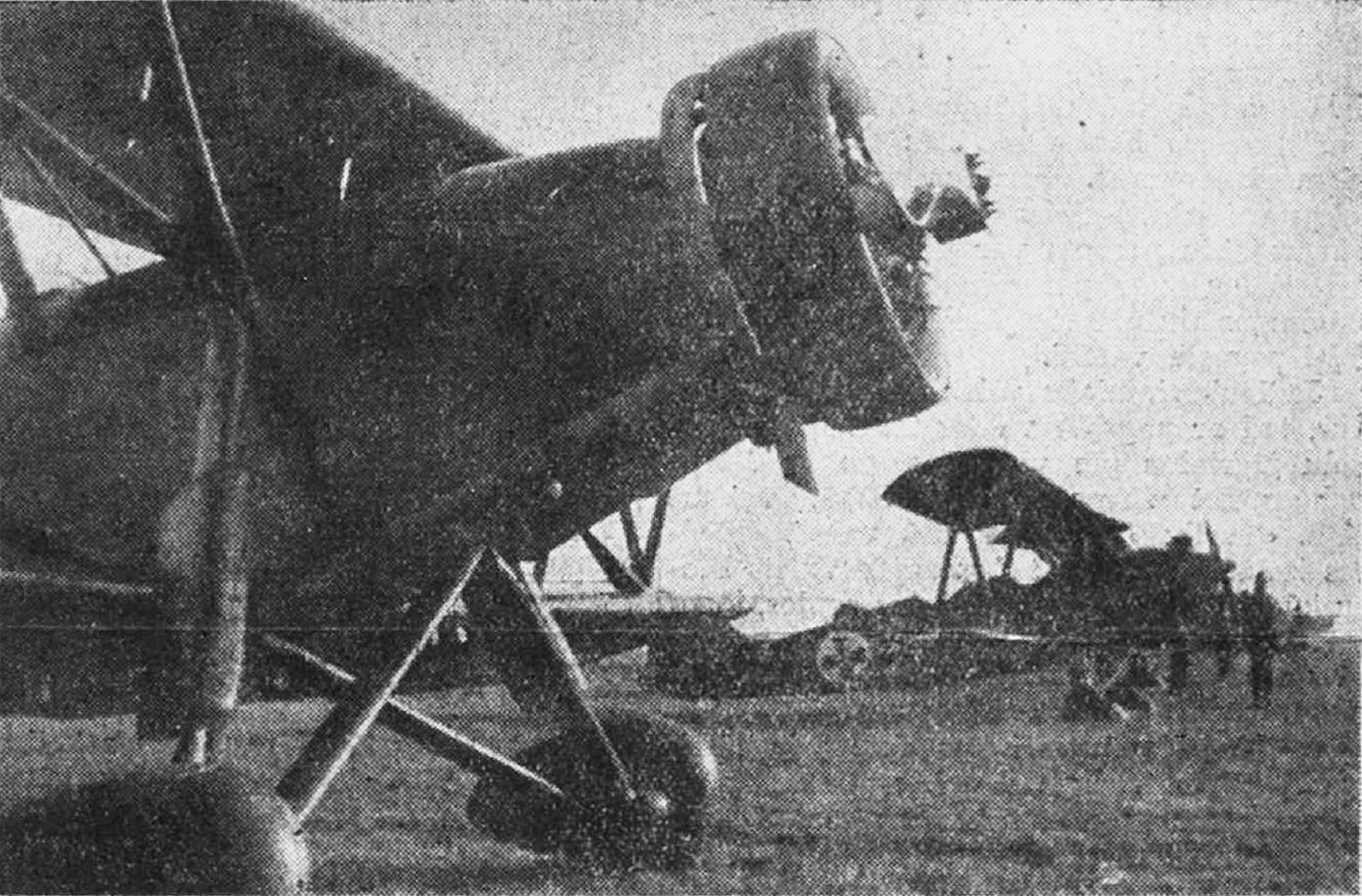
Aircraft lining up at Spilve in preparation for the Flight Around Latvia competition, 26 September 1937.

In 1937, the Civil Aviation Commission selected a route that began at Riga, passing through Spilve, Tukums, Kuldiga, Talsi, Ventspils, Liepaja, Ance, Bausa, Krustpils, Daugavpils, Koknese, Salaspils, Cesis, Valmiera, and ended at Spilve. The total length of the route measured 1,129 kilometres. On 26 September 1937, the race was held with eight participants, and the opening ceremony was held by civil aviation inspector Colonel J. Indāns. The participating aircraft were six KOD and two VEF aircraft, all of which were built in Latvia. The date also coincided with the last day of a large model plane contest held by the Latvian Aero Club at the airfield. All aviators reported to the airfield by 7:30 am, and aircraft departed in 10 minute intervals after 8:00. The flight lasted two days, and airmen stayed overnight in Krustpils and Daugavpils. The airfields at Tukums, Talsis, Koknese and Cesis required participants to drop markers on ground targets. General Balodis provided three monetary prizes and the Metropole theatre donated a cup to the victor, while Colonel J. Indāns provided a prize to a team which had dropped their markers on the targets the most accurately. The participants of the event were R. Celmins, R. Celms, R. Dzenis, T. Gailitis, R. Gulbis, A. Lasmanis, B. Leitans, K. Lesinskis, H. Pakulis, V. Priede, M. Ramonds, K. Reichmanis, P. Sotnieks, H. Strazdins, L. Svalbe, and A. Toms.

=== 1938 ===
The Latvian Aero Club organised the 1938 Flight Around Latvia, which rather aimed at challenging aviators at a variety of skills, including piloting and navigating, dropping of markers, and landing instead of setting records. A route was selected, which began at Riga, passing through Tukums, Talsi, Ventspils, Kuldiga, Liepaja, Auce, Jelgava, Bauska, Krustpils, Daugavpils, Varaklani, Gulbene, Valmiera, Rujiena, and Matisi. Finally, the route ended back at Riga. On 1 October 1938, the race began with 13 participants. The first aircraft, VEF I-12 #27 flown by K. Bandinieks took off at 8:49 am, with the rest of the participants following afterwards in 10 minute intervals. Most pilots stayed the night at Krustpils, and all aircraft left by next morning by order in which they had arrived from. At 12:08 pm, Bandinieks was the first to complete the course. For accuracy in landing, Gailitis in KOD-1 #22 took first place for not acclaiming any penalty points. In second place, P. Sotnieks in KOR-1 #10 while Gulbis, Ozolins, Rudzitis, and Sapratnieks were all tied for third place with 80 penalty points. For consistent speed, Sotnieks scored first place, Svalbe took second place, and Ansons came third. Finally, for accuracy in marker dropping, Sotnieks came first averaging only 5.4 metres from the targets. Ozolins in KOD-1 #41 scored second with an average distance of 5.8 metres, and Gailitis scored third with an average distance of 6.7 metres from the target. Following the event, the participants gathered for an awards banquet held at the Latvian Aero Club Hall on 11 October.
