= Spilve Airport =

Public use airport in Latvia

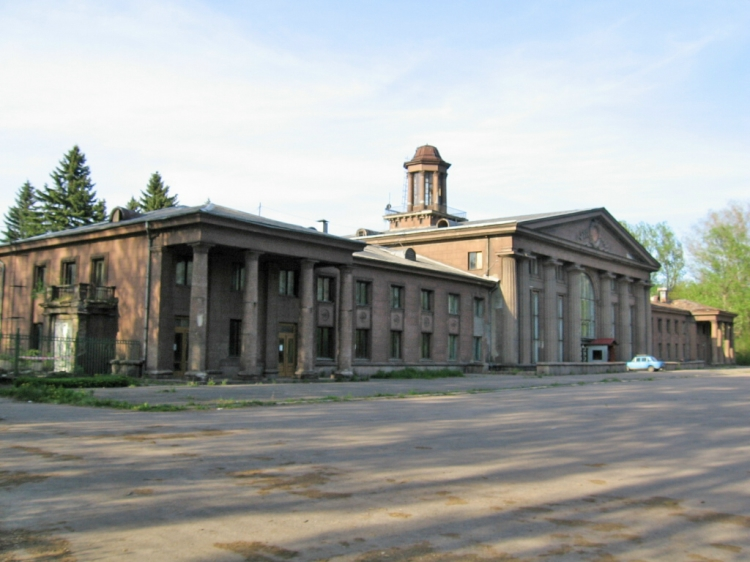
- IATA: QUS; ICAO: EVRS

Summary
- Airport type: Civil
- Location: Riga
- Elevation AMSL: 5 ft (1.5 m)
- Coordinates: 56°59′28″N 024°4′30″E
- Website: www.spilve.lv www.spilve.org?en

Maps
- Location of airport in Latvia
- Interactive map of Spilve Airport

Runways
| Direction | Length | | Surface |
| Direction | ft | m | Surface |
|---|---|---|---|
| 14/32 | 5,413 | 1,650 | Asphalt |

Spilve Airport (Latvian: Spilves lidosta, also given as Rīgas Centrālā lidosta – Riga Central Airport) is a former civilian and military airport in Latvia located 5 km north of Riga's city centre, from which aircraft took off as early as the First World War. It became the first international airport of Riga in the 1920s and fell into disuse in the 1980s after Riga International Airport was built.

== History ==
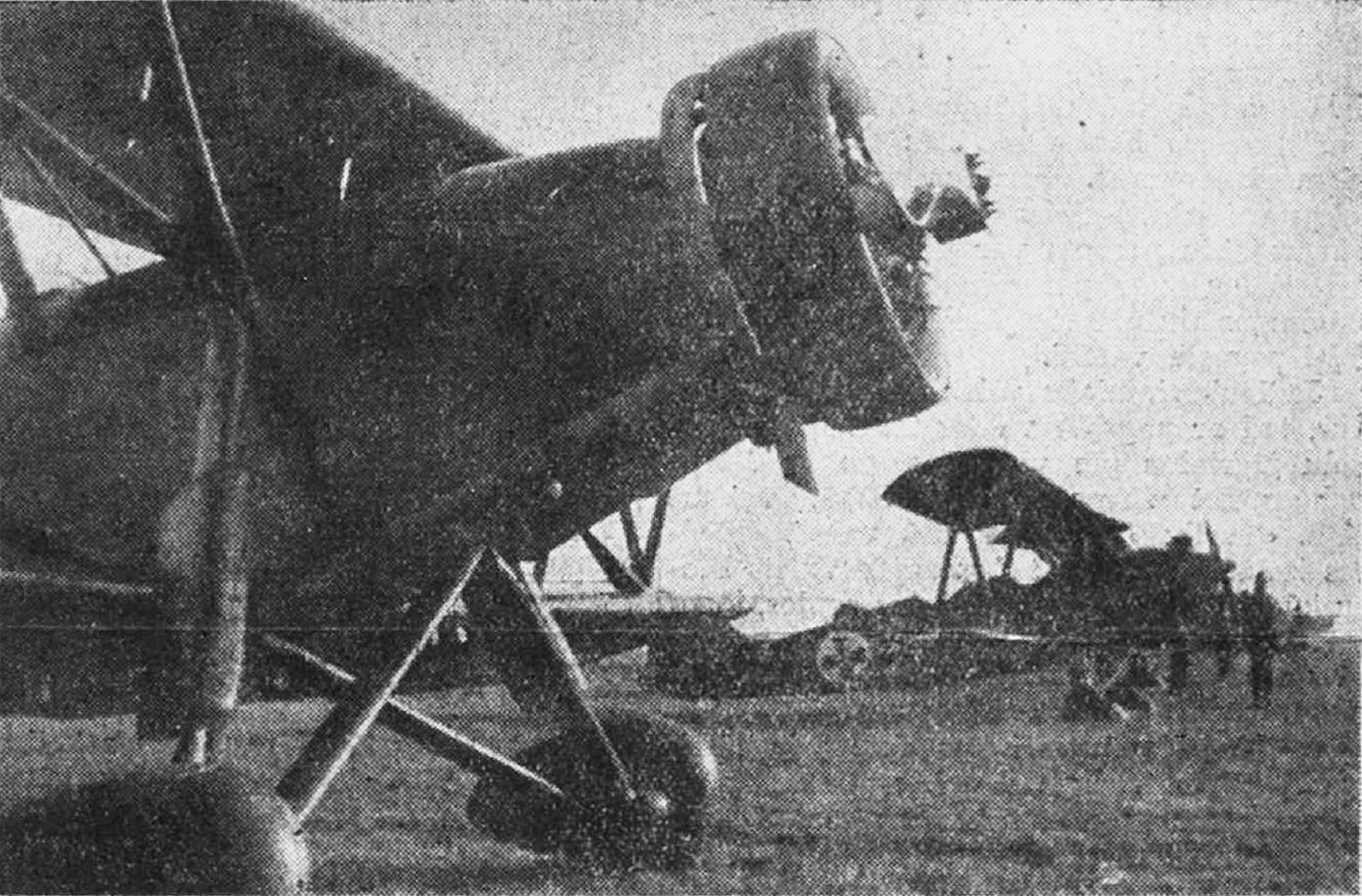
Aircraft lining up at Spilve in preparation for the Flight Around Latvia competition, 26 September 1937.

Spilve Airport was first established in 1916. On 15 April 1916, the 12th Fighter Squadron of the Imperial Russian Air Service was based there, flying Moranes, Sikorski and Nieuport aircraft.

In August 1916, newly acquired Nievport 24s arrived at Spilve Airport. Due to their poor condition, a repair base was established on the premises of a cement factory. Spare parts used to repair aircraft were collected from wartime airfields abandoned by the Germans in Ozolnieki, Pētersfelde near Dobele, Vecauce, and Vaiņode. During spring, the airfield became unserviceable when the Daugava flooded the field. In response, the Latvian Air Force organised the construction of drainage ditches, completed with pumps and sluices. During one particular spring, the airfield was completely flooded with large chunks of ice that came from the Daugava, and aircraft had to be hauled up onto the hangar roof to save them from damage. Following the Bermint-Avalon battles, on 29 November 1919, the airport became the principal base for the Latvian Air Force. Three hangars were designated for Air Force usage.

In 1922-1926 Latvijas Gaisa Satiksmes Akciju Sabiedriba operated flights on Berlin – Königsberg – Kaunas (or Klaipėda / Mėmel) – Riga line. From 1928, regular commercial flights of German-Soviet Deruluft linked Spilve with Berlin via Königsberg, Moscow via Smolensk and Leningrad via Tallinn. From 1932 Polish LOT connected Spilve to Warsaw via Vilnius and to Helsinki via Tallinn. In 1936 German Lufthansa started flights Berlin-Königsberg-Kaunas-Riga-Tallinn-Helsinki. In 1937 Swedish Aerotransport (A.B.A.) and Soviet Aeroflot started a route Stockholm-Riga-Velikiye Luki-Moscow. In 1937-1940 Latvian Valsts gaisa satiksme had regular flights from Spilve to Liepāja.

On 15 March 1936, construction of the Aizsargi (Guards Organization of Latvia) headquarters building had begun, and the cornerstone was laid next to the existing hangars. It was unofficially named "Alkazars," referencing the Siege of the Alcázar that took place during the Spanish Civil War. On 2 October 1937, the headquarters building was completed, costing 77,300 lats. The total sum was donated by individuals and various companies. It was three storeys, and had a deck and balcony on the roof. The ground floor was used for storage and workshops, and the second floor was used for a meeting room and office for the AA commander. On the third floor were other offices for a doctor, meteorologist, photo developing room, and supplies and armament officers. Beginning in 1936, Spilve Airport served as the beginning and ending point for the national-held 1936, 1937, and 1938 Flight Around Latvia competitions. On 24 January 1938, construction work for two new hangars began, and were reserved for the Aizsargi. Throughout September 1938, the Aizsargi conducted night flying exercises over Spilve Airport, and warning lights were affixed to the chimneys of buildings. When the formation would return, a large spotlight would light up the landing field. Construction of the hangars was completed on 30 September 1938.

=== World War II ===
On 17 June 1940, the Soviet Air Forces occupied Spilve Airport, becoming a major Soviet fighter base through 1940 and 1941. In January 1941, the 21st Istrebitelny Aviatsionny Polk (Fighter Aviation Regiment) arrived at Spilve Airport. On 1 March, plans were drawn for the construction of a concrete runway. Shortly afterwards, the plan was approved on 24 March and construction began in June. On 22 June, the 6th Smeshannaya Aviatsionnaya Diviziya (Mixed Aviation Division) arrived, and 66 fighters and 16 bombers were based at the airport. Through late June, Spilve Airport was heavily bombed by the Luftwaffe. On 26 June 1941, 11 bombers attacked the airfield, and anti-aircraft defense failed to deter the aircraft as they climbed to a much higher altitude. The fuel dump was bombed, leading to an uncontrolled fire that burnt down the administrative and control tower building.

On 1 July 1941, German troops captured Riga along with Spilve Airport. After it was captured, the airport underwent a large reconstruction project, and was carried by more than 1,000 prisoners. The landing ground was extended by 800 x 800 meters, and a second concrete runway was added. Spilve Airport began hosting several fighter, bomber, liaison, and reconnaissance squadrons. Maintenance units were also deployed, which maintained and repaired aircraft from the Eastern Front. On 11 October 1944, retreating German forces buried mines 20 metres apart along the taxiway and runway. Explosive charges were also planted on the hangars and other buildings. Afterwards, the airport was completely blown up, rendering it unusable by advancing Soviet forces. Two days later, Spilve Airport was captured.

=== Post-war ===
After World War II and the Soviet re-occupation of Latvia in 1944 the airport was rebuilt as the hub for Aeroflot. A new ring taxiway was added and the tarmac changed. The terminal building completed in 1954, still remains as a notable example of Stalin's neoclassical architecture. This building was completely renovated in 2012 and will host Latvian Aviation Museum. The airfield was closed for regular flights in the late 1980s. A large technical school existed here until the 1990s with one of each major Soviet aircraft type, including Ilyushin Il-18, Ilyushin Il-62 and Tupolev Tu-134, most broken up around 1996 or 1997.

== Current use ==
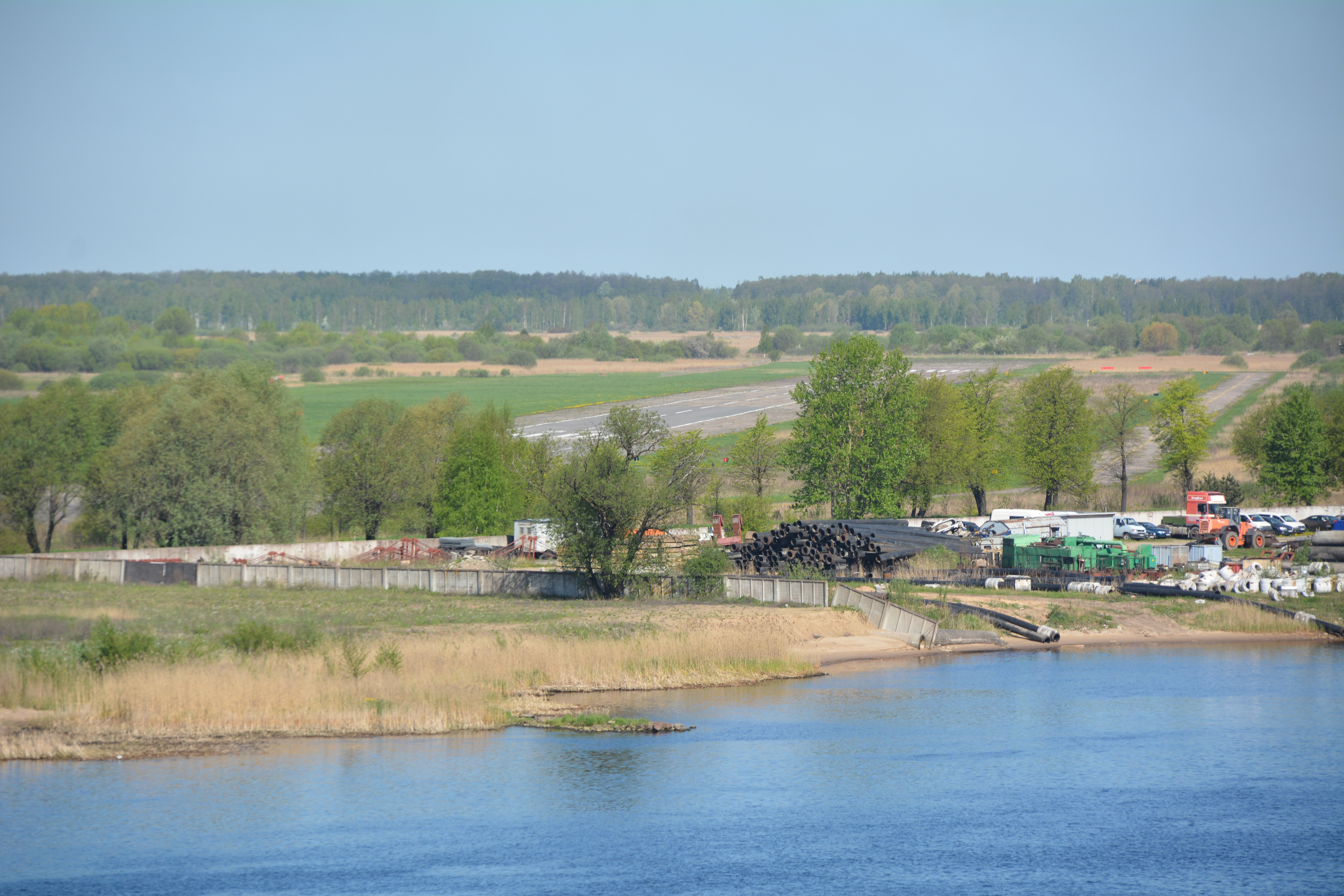
Spilve Airport, seen from River Daugava

The airfield at Spilve is now published in the Latvian pilot's guide "VFR Guide Latvia". A new (third) hangar has now been built housing up to 5 aircraft (ultralights and aerobatic aircraft) complementing the two existing hangar buildings. The larger hangar seen on satellite imagery is being used to house up to 12 aircraft ranging from ultralight to Cessna 210, while a second hangar to the north east is used for ultralights and flex-wing microlights. Spilve Airport Museum is currently closed.

Riga Spilve is being increasingly used as a base for training private pilots.

The terminal building is currently being turned into the Latvian Aviation Museum.

== Cultural heritage status ==
The airport's central building with its avenue is listed as a Latvian state-protected architectural monument of national significance under protection number 8809. The protected object is recorded as "Lidostas Spilve centrālā ēka ar aleju" at Daugavgrīvas iela 140 in Riga. The official preservation instructions identify its protected values as including the building's spatial setting, structural arrangement, layout, facades, roof form, decorative interior finishes and plantings.

== Transportation ==
Public transportation is available. From Stockmann take bus No.3 going in the direction of Bolderāja. Exit at Māju celtniecības kombināts stop.

== Units ==
The following units were based at Spilve Airport:

Operational units (Luftwaffe)

- 1st Squadron, Jagdgeschwader 54 (1./JG 54 – Fighter Wing 54), July 1941
- Geschwader Staff and II Group, Kampfgeschwader 1 (KG 1 – Bomber Wing 1), July 1941
- 1st Liaison Squadron (Verbindungsstaffel 1), July 1941
- Air Fleet 1 Flight Detachment (Flugbereitschaft Luftflotte 1), 1941–1944
- Special Squadron 1 (Sonderstaffel 1), July–November 1941
- Battle Group 806 (Kampfgruppe 806), August–October 1941
- I Group, Special Duties Bomber Wing 1 (I./KG z.b.V. 1), September–October 1941
- Part of Special Duties Battle Group 172 (KGr. z.b.V. 172), October 1941 – June 1942
- I Group, Bomber Wing 53 (I./KG 53), January–May 1942
- Special Duties Battle Group 211 (KGr. z.b.V. 211), February–April 1942
- Medical Flight Detachment 1 (Sanitätsflugbereitschaft 1), February/March 1942 – September 1944
- Special Duties Battle Group 6 (KGr. z.b.V. 6), March 1942
- Special Duties Battle Group 102 (KGr. z.b.V. 102), March–April 1942
- Staff and I & II Groups, Bomber Wing 4 (KG 4), March–May 1942
- Special Duties Battle Group 4 (KGr. z.b.V. 4), March–April 1942
- Special Duties Battle Group 5 (KGr. z.b.V. 5), March–April 1942
- II Group, Bomber Wing 27 (II./KG 27), April–May 1942 (uncertain)
- Staff, Liaison Command (Special) 1 (Verbindungskommando (S) 1), May 1942 – May 1943
- 1st DFS Glider Squadron, Liaison Command (Special) 1, June–October 1942 & December 1942 – May 1943
- 1st Gotha Squadron, Liaison Command (Special) 1, June–October 1942
- Elements of Bomber Wing 1 (KG 1), August–November 1942
- Special Duties Battle Group 500 (KGr. z.b.V. 500), August–November 1942
- Luftdienstkommando Ostland (Air Service Command Ostland), October 1942 – May 1944
- 2nd DFS Glider Squadron, Liaison Command (Special) 1, December 1942 – February 1943
- III Group, Luftlandegeschwader 1 (Air Landing Wing 1), January–March 1943
- 51st Liaison Squadron (Verbindungsstaffel 51), January–May 1943
- 2nd Squadron, Special Duties Transport Wing 7 (2./Fliegergeschwader z.b.V. 7), March 1943; June 1943; February 1944
- Flight Detachment, Field Air District Command XXVI (Flugbereitschaft Feldluftgaukdo. XXVI), April 1943 – September 1944
- IV Group, Transport Wing 1 (IV./TG 1), November 1943 – January 1944
- 3rd Reconnaissance Squadron, Reconnaissance Group 22 (3.(F)/Aufklärungsgruppe 22), January–October 1944
- Detachment of 4th Squadron, Night Fighter Wing 100 (4./NJG 100), 1944
- 3rd Night Reconnaissance Squadron (Aufklärungsstaffel 3.(F) Nacht), January–July 1944
- Staff, Long-Range Reconnaissance Group 1 (FAGr. 1), February–October 1944
- Weather Reconnaissance Squadron 1, Air Fleet 1 (Wekusta 1), April/May – July 1944
- Target Towing Squadron 10 (Fliegerzielstaffel 10), June–October 1944
- 5th Reconnaissance Squadron, Reconnaissance Group 122 (5.(F)/Aufklärungsgruppe 122), July–October 1944
- 4th Night Reconnaissance Squadron (Aufklärungsstaffel 4.(F) Nacht), April–October 1944
- Staff, Schlachtgeschwader 2 (Ground Attack Wing 2), August 1944
- 10th Anti-Tank Squadron, Schlachtgeschwader 2 (10.(Pz.)/SG 2), August 1944
- II Group, Schlachtgeschwader 3 (II./SG 3), August–October 1944
- II Group, Schlachtgeschwader 4 (II./SG 4), August–September 1944
- 14th Ice Reconnaissance Squadron, Bomber Wing 55 (14.(Eis)/KG 55), July–September 1944
- 10th Anti-Tank Squadron, Schlachtgeschwader 3 (10.(Pz.)/SG 3), September–October 1944
- Staff and I & II Groups, Jagdgeschwader 54 (Fighter Wing 54), September–October 1944
- Staff and I & II Groups, Bomber Wing 102 (KG 102 – School Units), June 1943 – August 1944
- 11th Squadron, Bomber Wing 100 (11./KG 100 – Training/Replacement), December 1941 – April 1942
- IV Group, Bomber Wing 1 (IV./KG 1 – Training/Replacement), August 1942

Non-flying units (Luftwaffe)

- Airfield Commandant A 201/I (Fliegerhorstkommandantur A 201/I), 1943–1944
- Airfield Commandant A(o) 101/I (Fliegerhorstkommandantur A(o) 101/I), April–October 1944
- Staff, 3rd Air Division (Stab/3. Fliegerdivision), September–October 1944
- Fighter Sector Commander Ostland (Jagdabschnittsführer Ostland), December 1943 – September 1944
- Field Maintenance Detachment 60, Luftwaffe (V/Feldwerftverband 60 d.Lw.), February–October 1944
- Maintenance Department 20/I (Werft-Abteilung 20/I), April & August 1944
- Maintenance Company 24 (Werft-Kompanie 24), February 1944 – ?
- Maintenance Company 25 (Werft-Kompanie 25), February 1944 – ?
- Maintenance Platoon 100 (Werftzug 100), March 1944
- Maintenance Platoon 705 (Werftzug 705), March 1944
- Winter Aircraft Equipment Special Detachment 62 (Flieger-Wintersondergerätetrupp 62), 1944
- Air Torpedo Operations Company 3 (Lufttorpedo-Betriebskompanie 3), September 1943
- Air Torpedo Operations Company 6 (Lufttorpedo-Betriebskompanie 6), June 1943
- Front Repair Facility GL 2771 (Frontreparaturbetrieb GL 2771), 1942–1944
- Front Repair Facility GL 2772 (Espenlaub Works), ? – September 1944

== Gallery ==
Present images of Spilve Airport
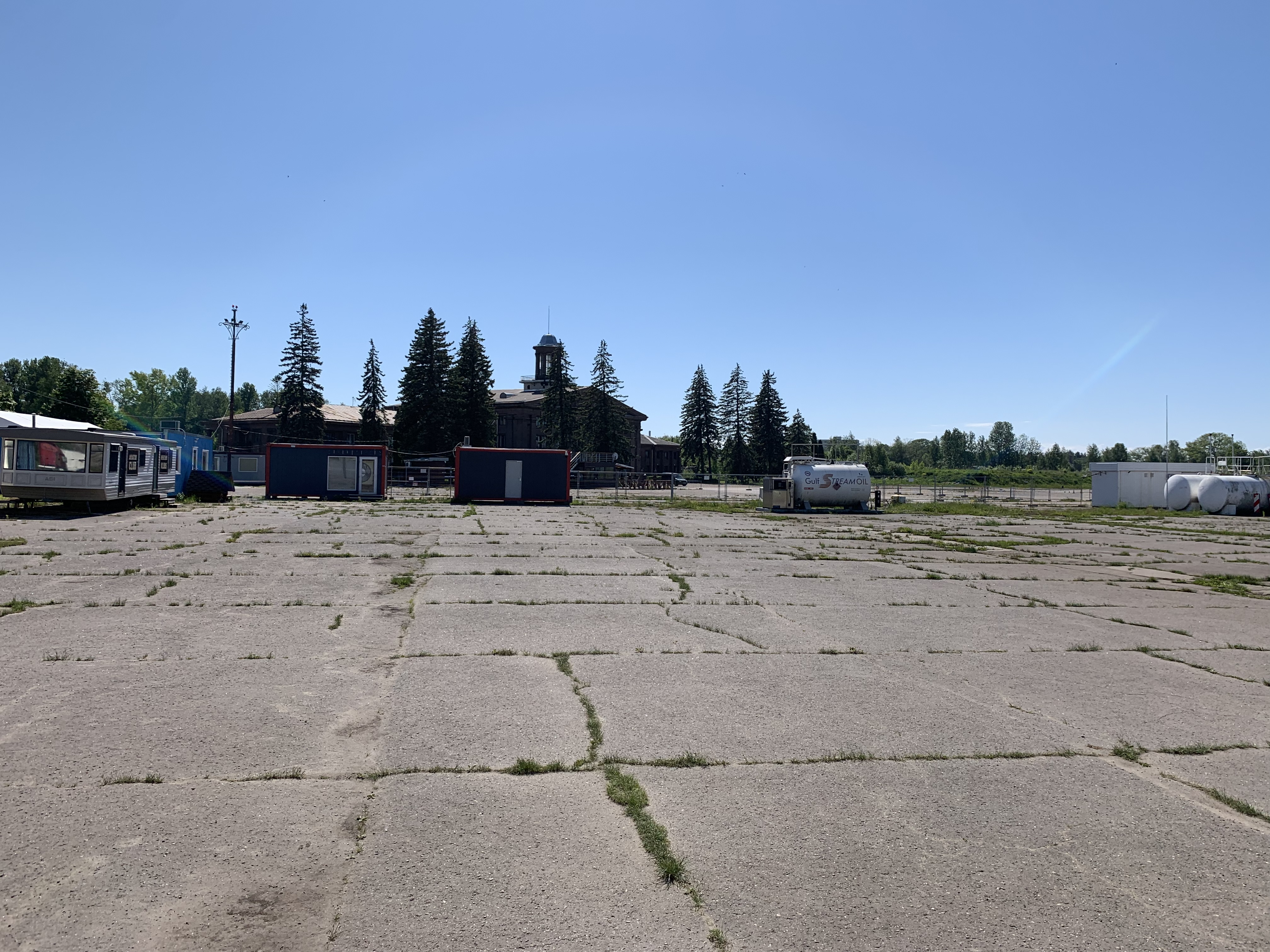
A view of the apron in 2021 with the terminal in the background

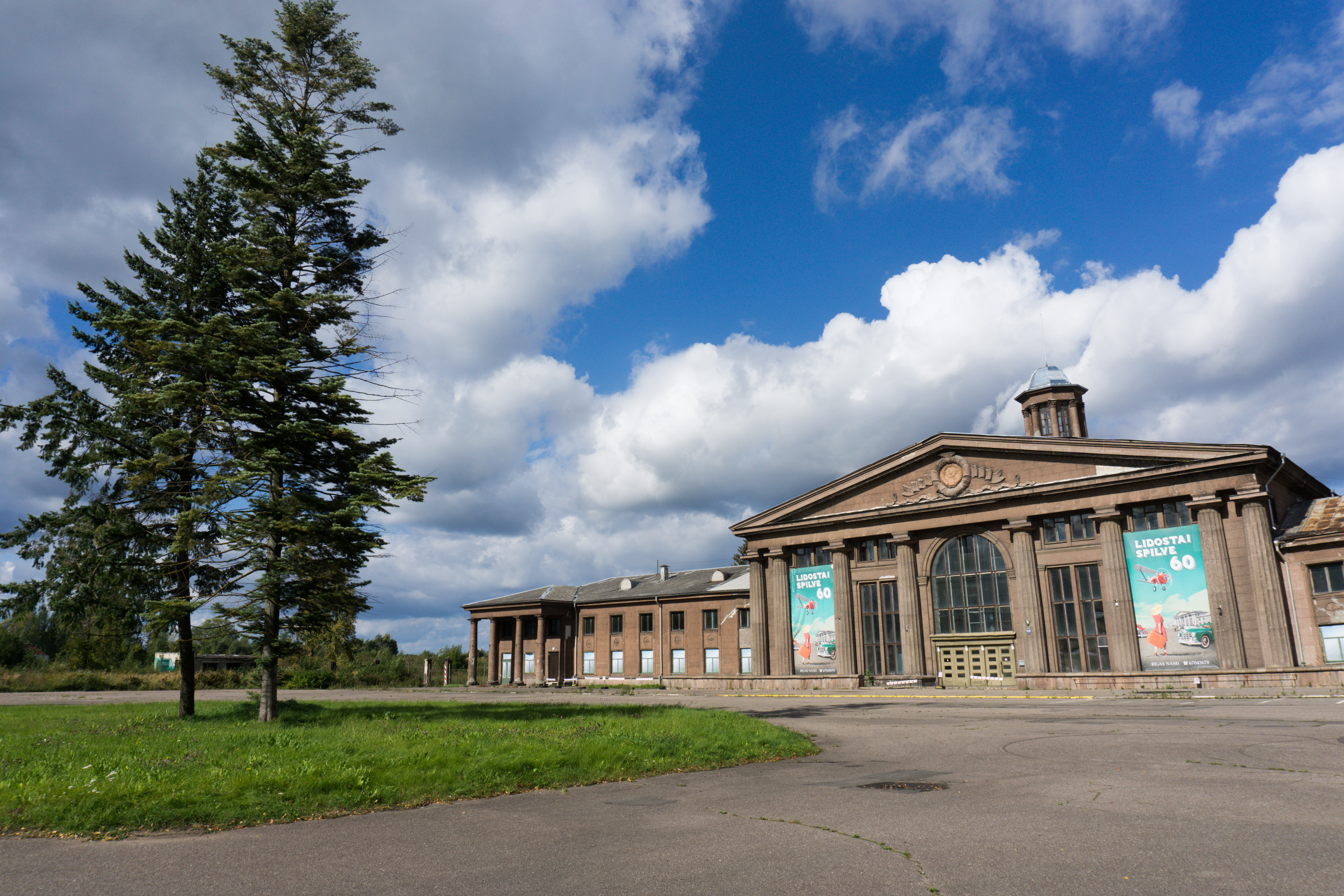
A view of the old airport terminal, taken from the carpark in 2015

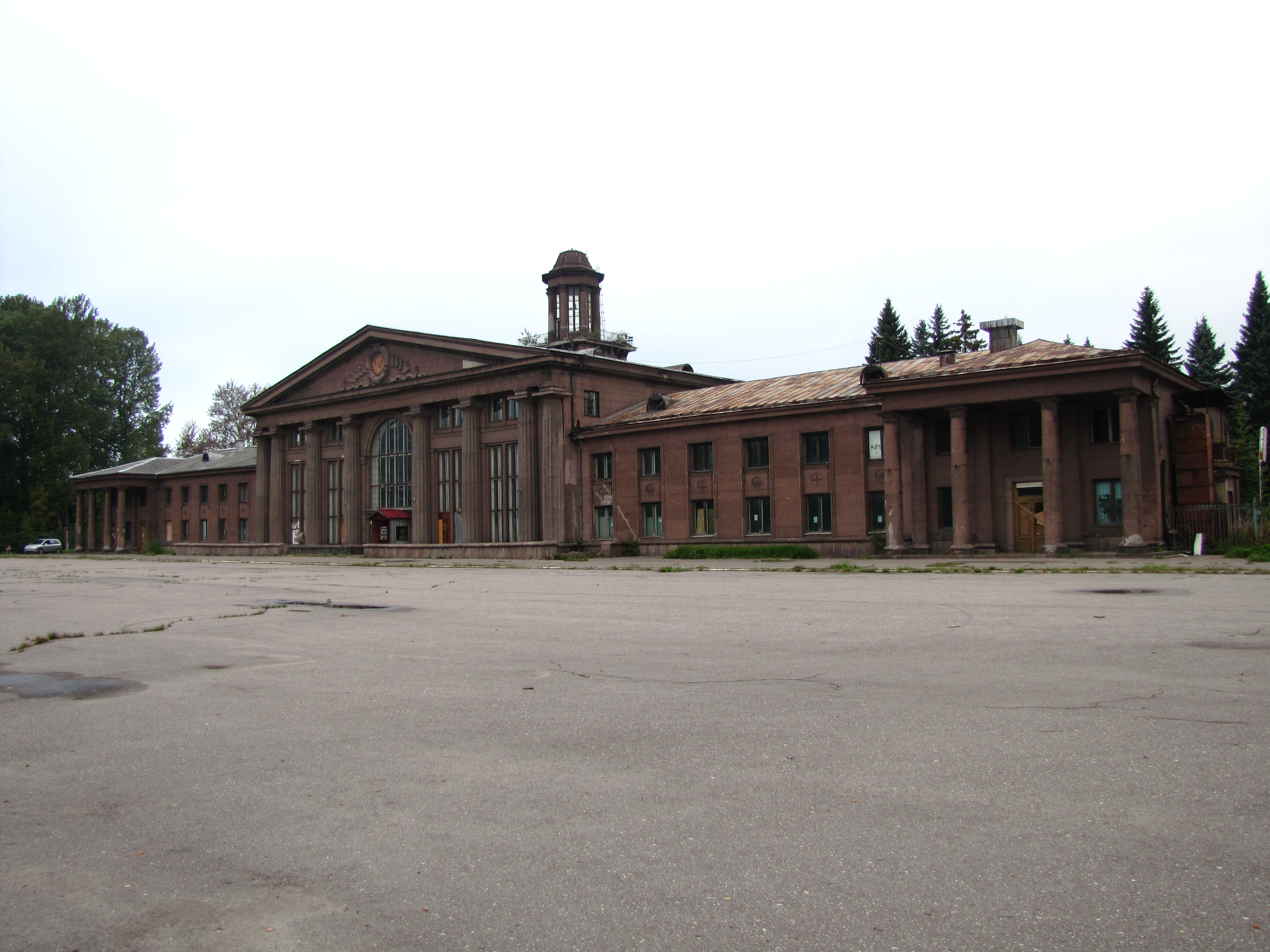
The old terminal two years before a major restoration was undertaken in 2012

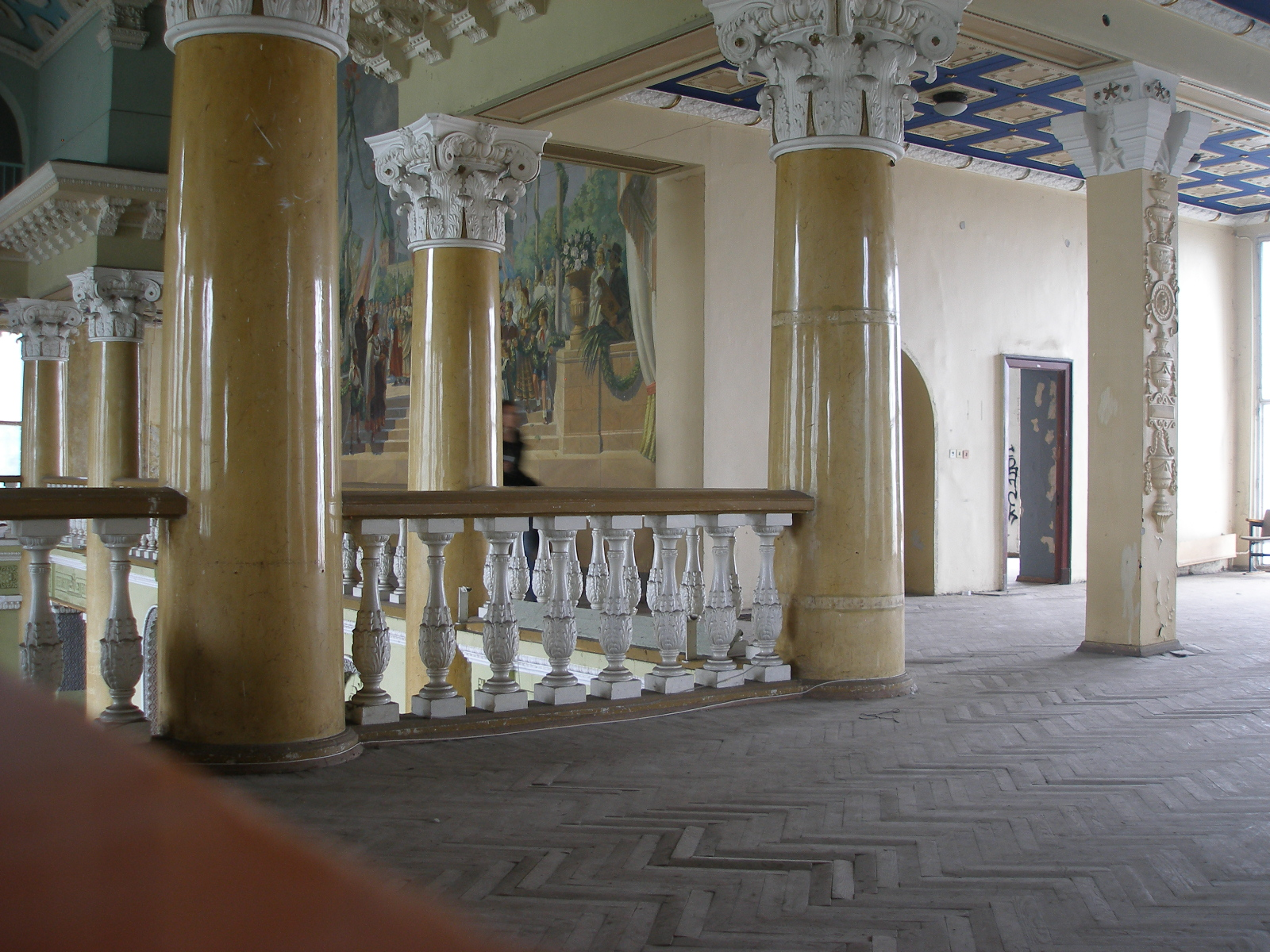
Interior of the terminal in 2011

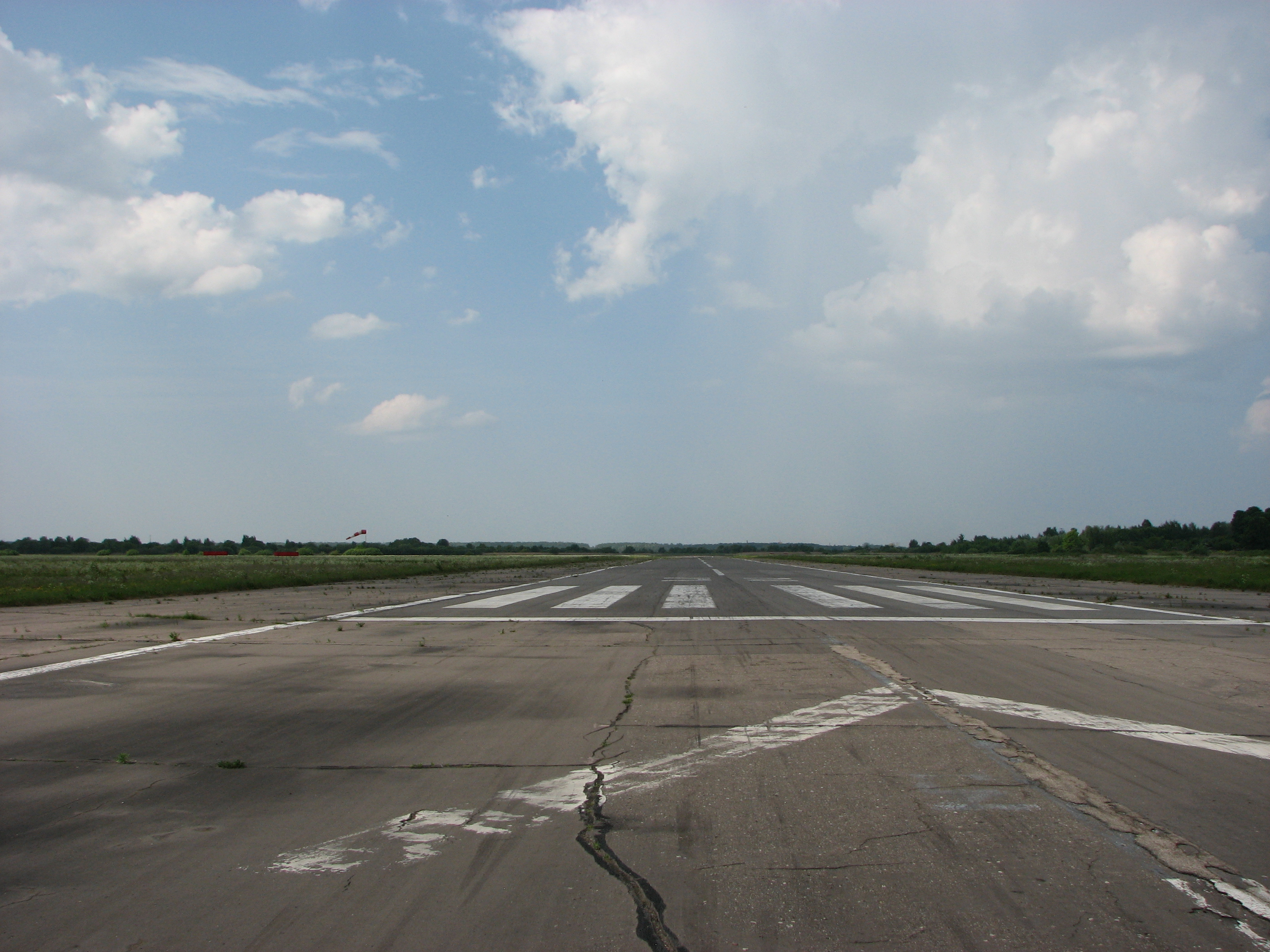
A photograph of the old runway taken in 2016.

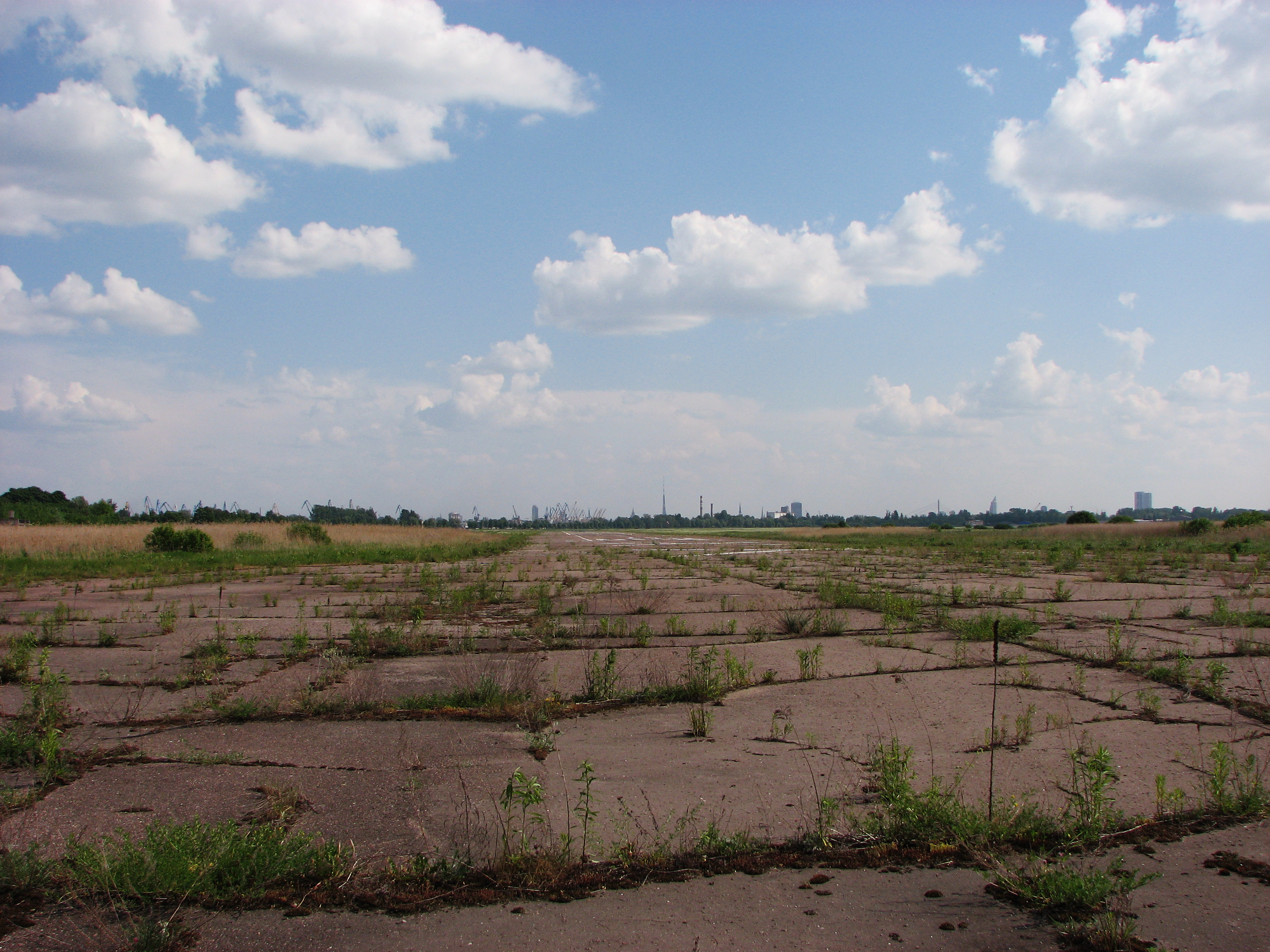
Another angle of the old runway taken in 2016.

Images of the flying clubs at Spilve Airport
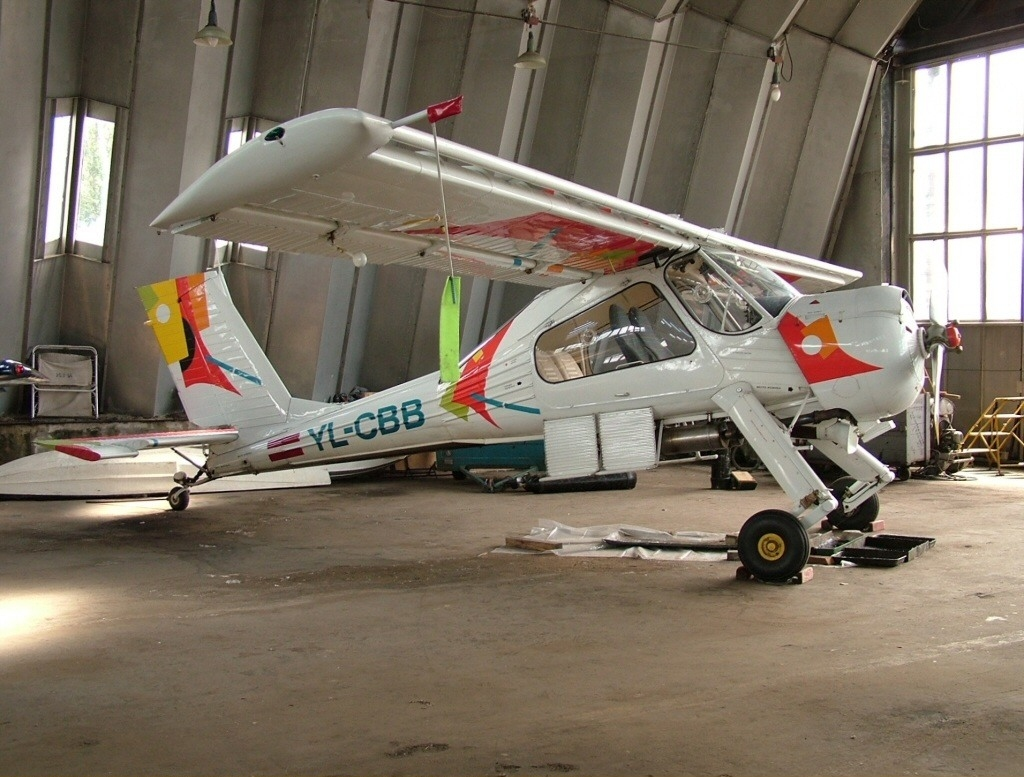

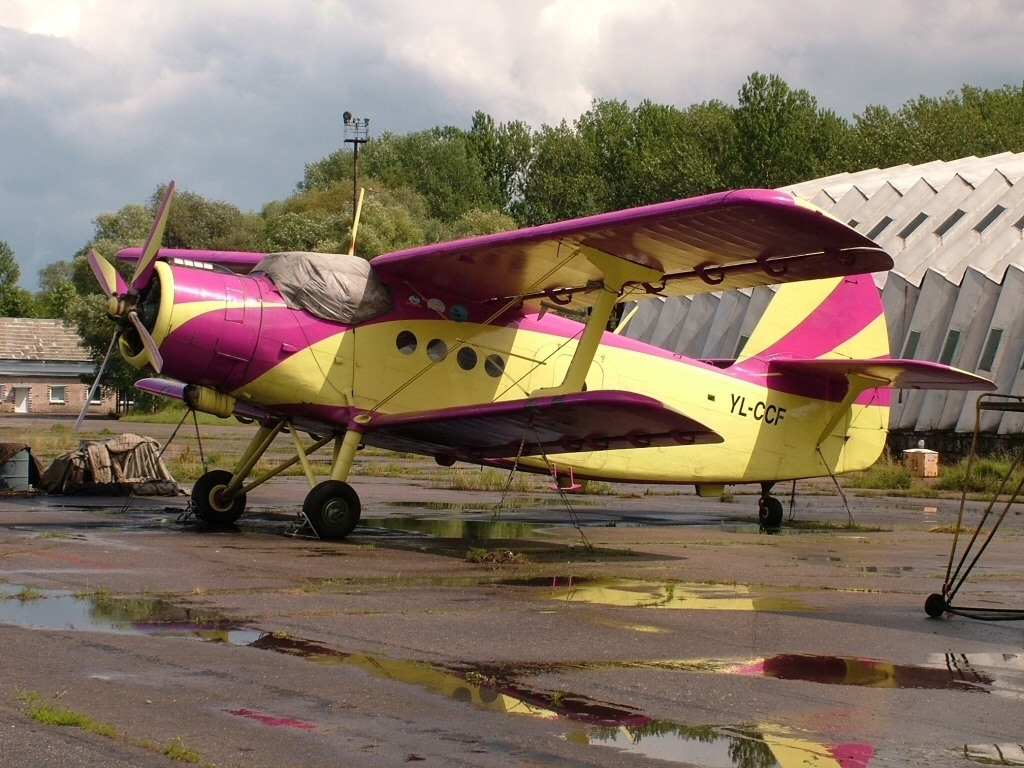
An Antonov AN-2 at the airport registered as YL-CCF

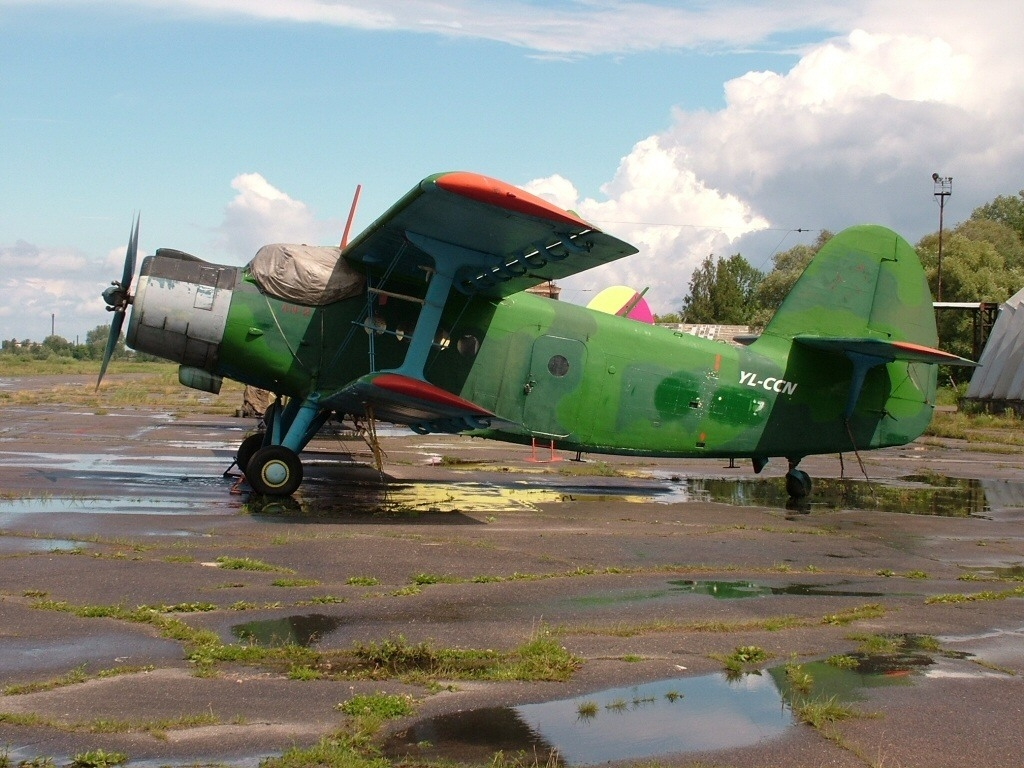
Another AN-2 at the airport registered as YL-CCN

Historic images of Spilve Airport
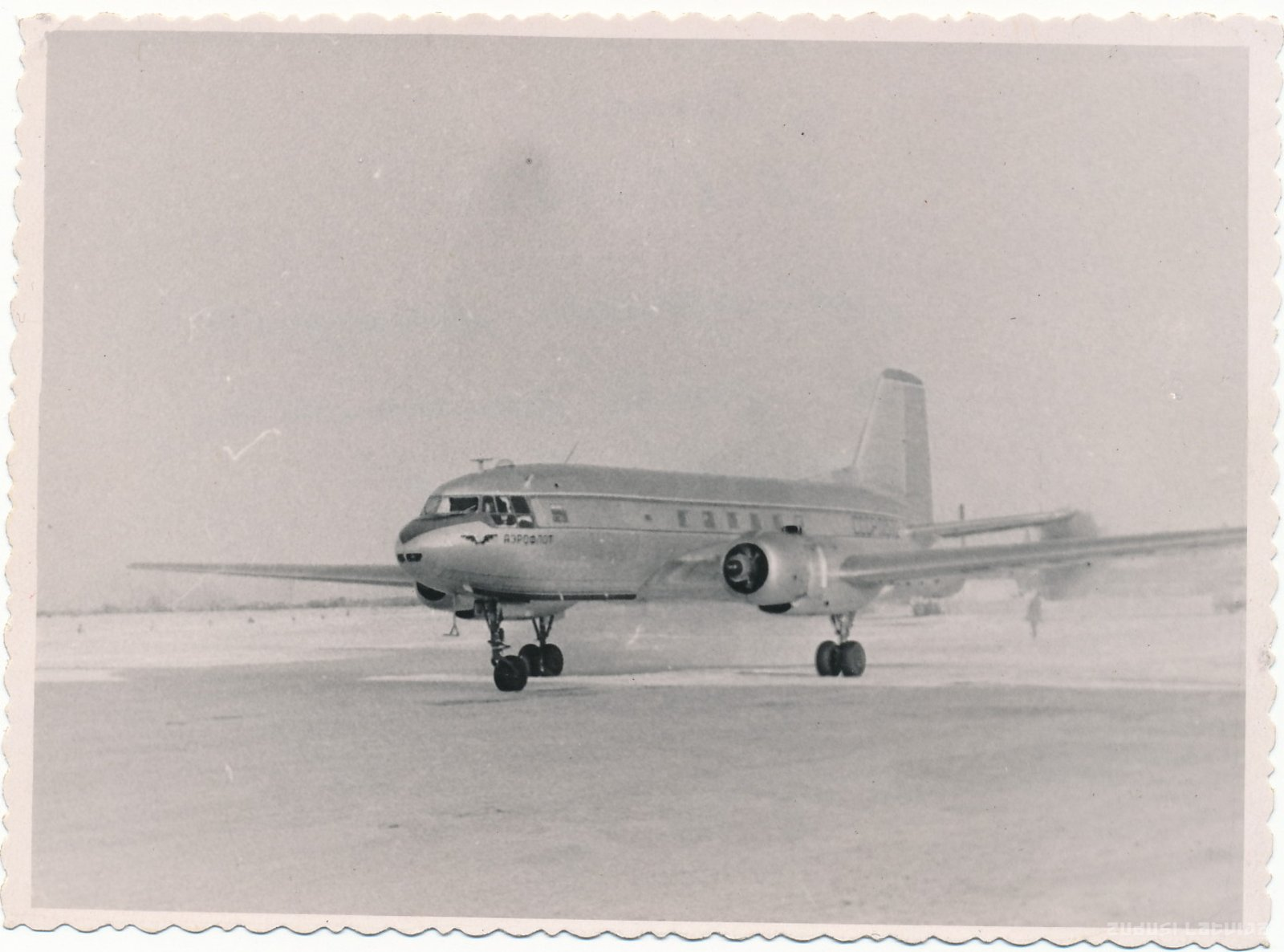
An Ilyushin Il-14 operated by Aeroflot landing at Spilve in 1957.

== See also ==
- Riga Aviation Museum
- List of aviation museums
