= Saab 35 Draken =

1955 Swedish fighter aircraft

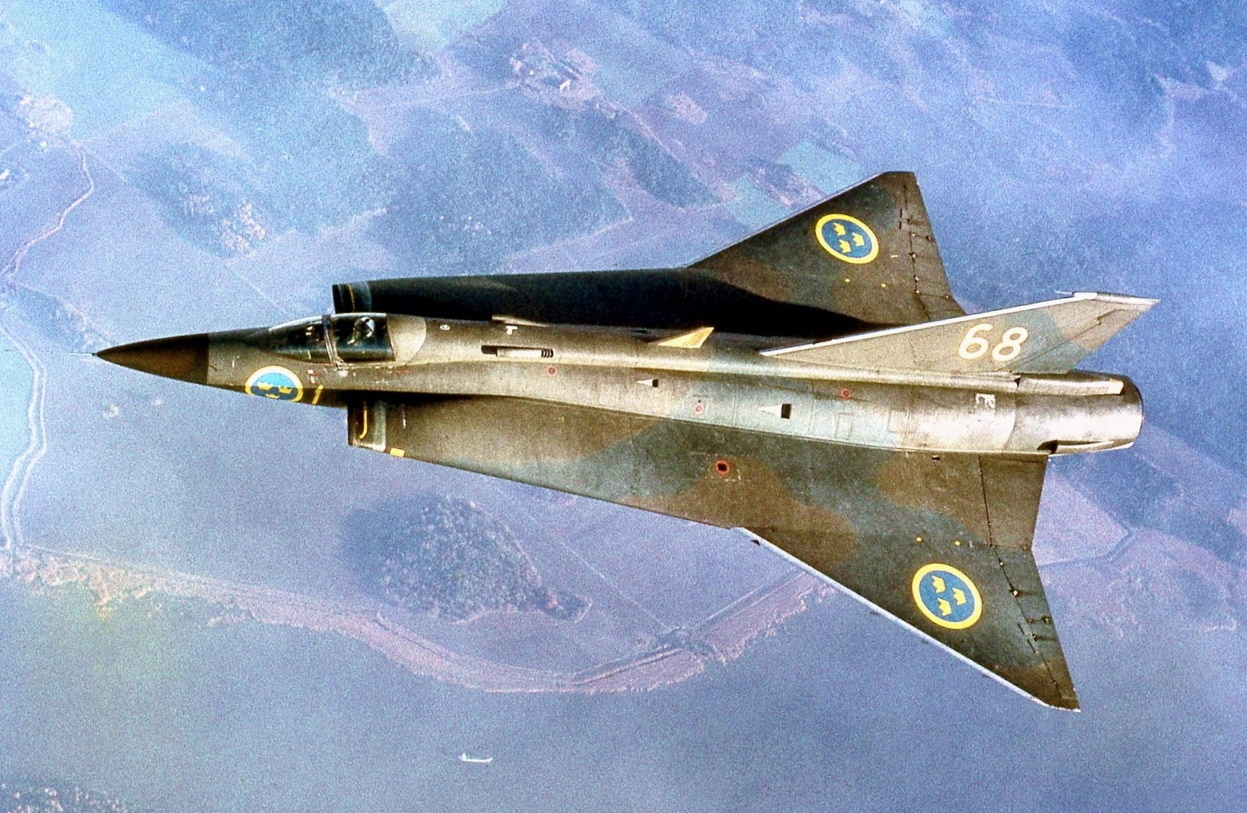
- Swedish Air Force Saab 35F Draken

General information
- Type: Fighter-interceptor
- National origin: Sweden
- Manufacturer: Svenska Aeroplan AB (SAAB)
- Status: Retired from military service
- Primary users: Swedish Air Force Austrian Air Force; Finnish Air Force; Royal Danish Air Force
- Number built: 651

History
- Manufactured: 1955–1974
- Introduction date: 6 March 1960 (frontline service)
- First flight: 25 October 1955
- Retired: 2005 (Austria)
- Developed from: Saab 210

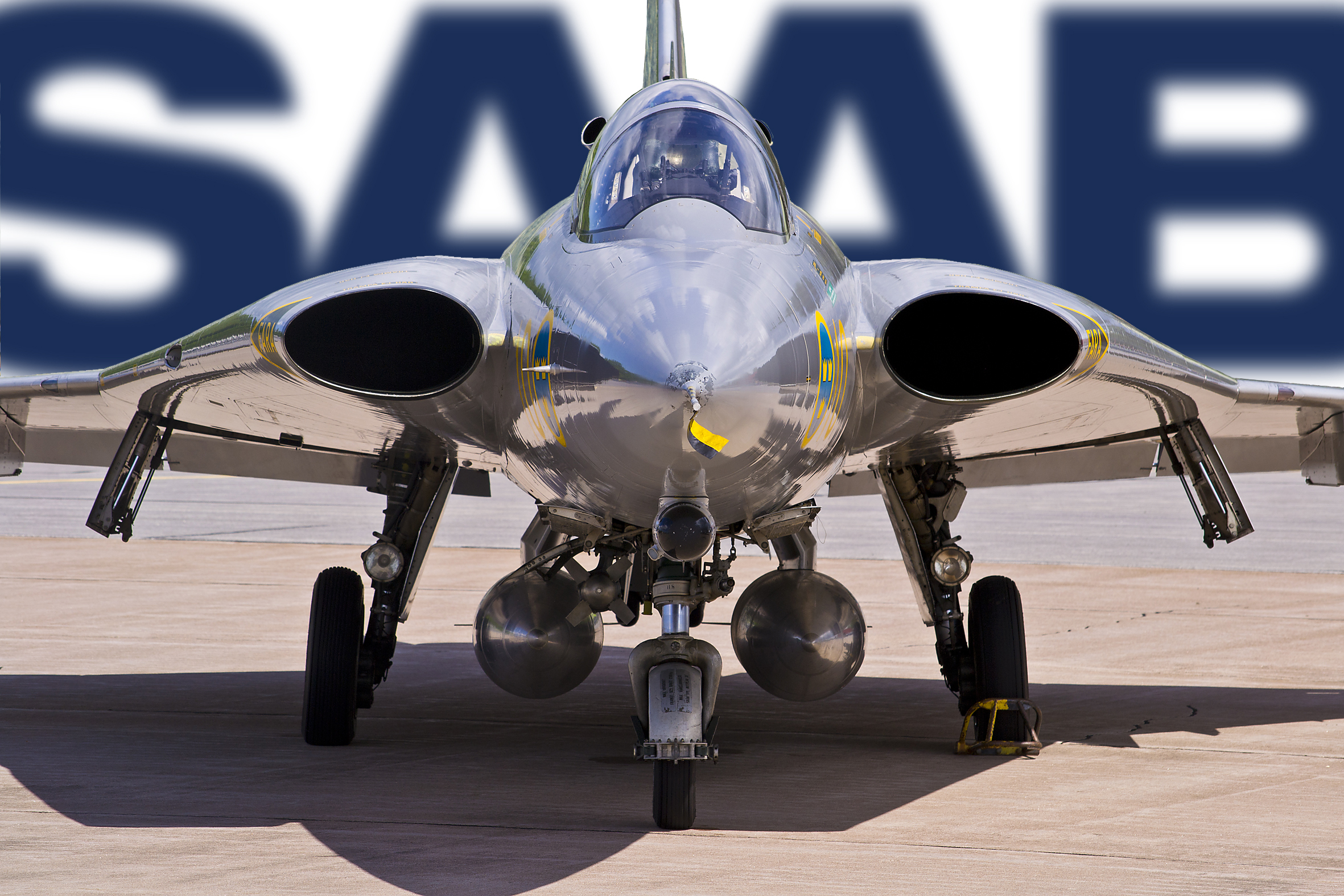
Saab 35J

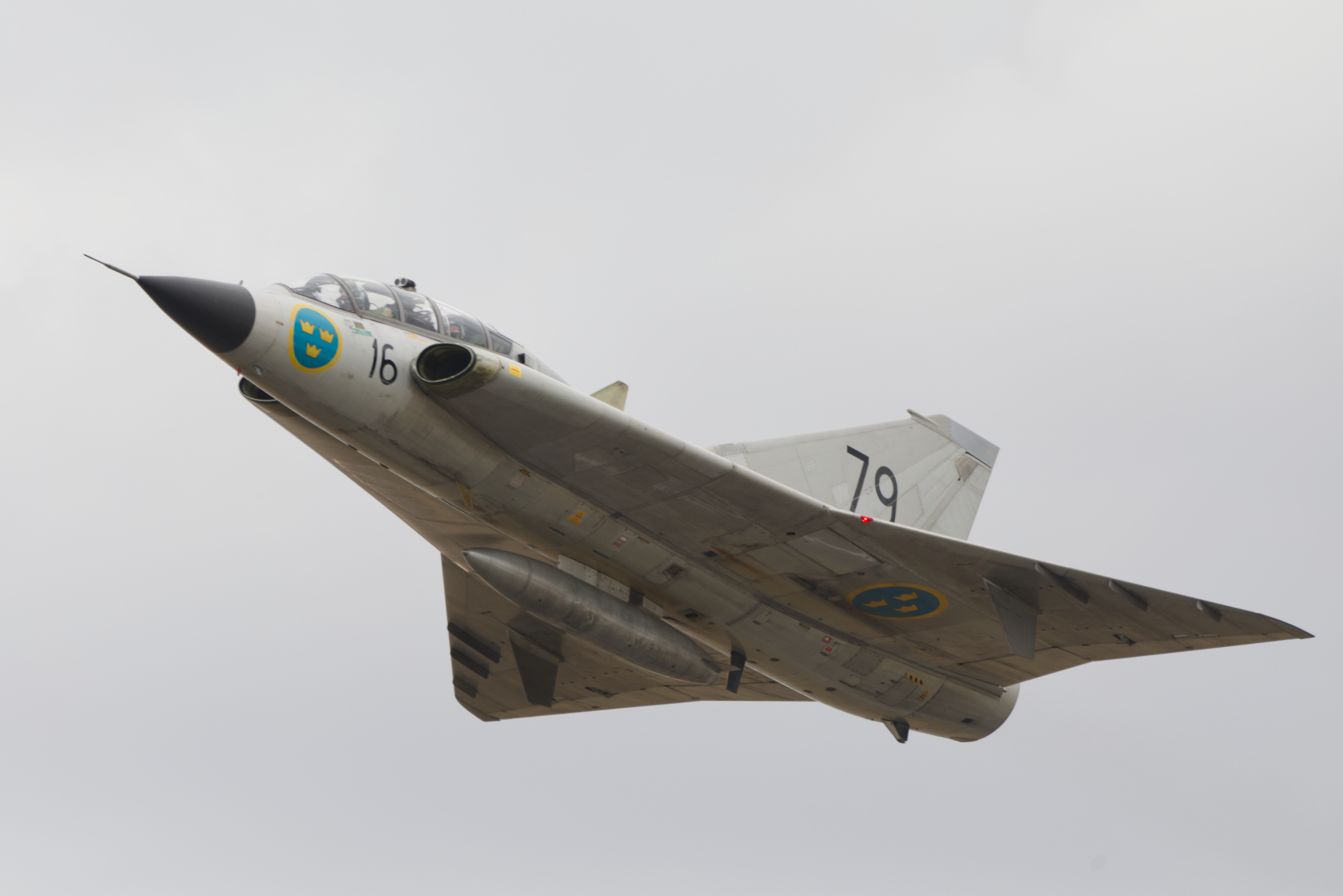
Saab 35C

The Saab 35 Draken (IPA: [²drɑːkɛn]; The Kite, ambiguous with The Dragon) (Note: The names of Swedish combat aircraft, like Viggen or Draken, are in the definite form, while non-combat aircraft like Saab Safir and Scandia are in indefinite form.) is a Swedish fighter-interceptor developed and manufactured by Svenska Aeroplan Aktiebolaget (SAAB) between 1955 and 1974. Development of the Saab 35 Draken started in 1948 as the Swedish Air Force future replacement for the then also in development Saab 29 Tunnan day fighter and Saab 32B Lansen all-weather fighter. It featured an innovative but unproven double delta wing, leading to the creation of a sub-scale test aircraft, the Saab 210, which was produced and flown to test this previously unexplored aerodynamic feature. The full-scale production version entered service with frontline squadrons of the Swedish Air Force on 8 March 1960. It was produced in several variants and types, most commonly as a fighter-interceptor.

The Draken functioned as an effective supersonic fighter aircraft of the Cold War period, although it was never used in conflict. Even though the type was designed and intended as an interceptor, it was considered to be a very capable dogfighter for the era. In Swedish service, it underwent several upgrades, the ultimate of these being the J 35J model. By the mid-1980s, the SAF's Drakens had largely been replaced by the more advanced JA 37 Viggen fighter, while the introduction of the more capable Saab JAS 39 Gripen fighter was expected in service within a decade, although delayed. As a consequence of cutbacks and high maintenance costs, the SAF opted to retire the Draken during December 1999. The type was also exported to the air forces of Austria, Denmark and Finland. Danish aircraft have been exported, post-service, to the United States where they have seen use as training aircraft for test pilots.

== Naming ==
The Swedish word "Draken" has a double meaning, translating either as "The Dragon" or "The Kite". It is said that the name was derived from the appearance of the prototype, like a paper kite, when seen from above.

The number "35" comes from the aircraft's Swedish Air Force-designation: "flygplan 35" (fpl 35), meaning "aeroplane 35". Depending on the given role, the aircraft received a prefix to indicate its type, the most common being "J 35" to indicate "jaktflygplan" (pursuit-aircraft), the Swedish term for fighter aircraft.

== Development ==
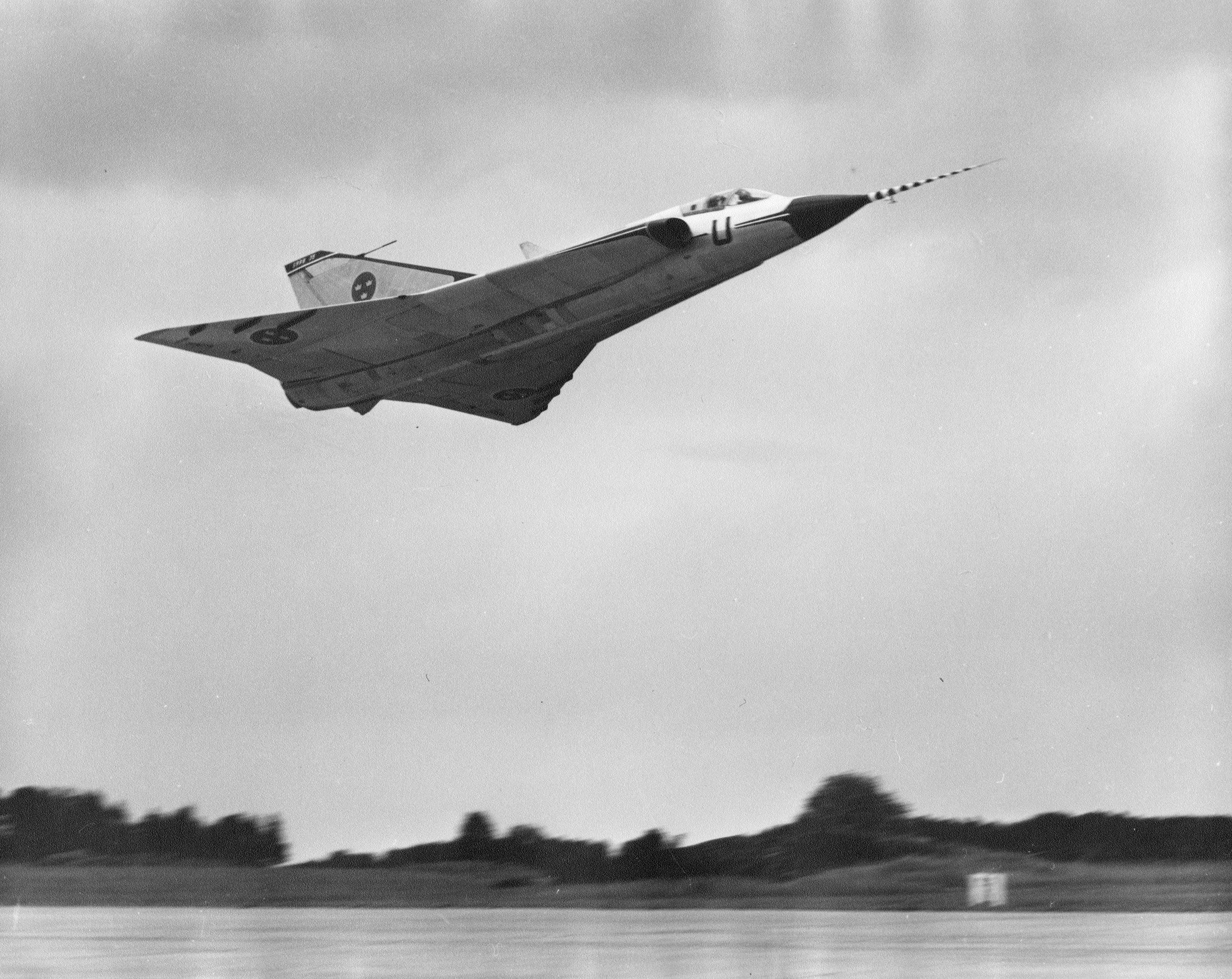
Saab 35 prototype (Fpl 35–1) flying. Commonly called Urban Röd (Urban Red), the "U" mark stood for "utveckling" (development).

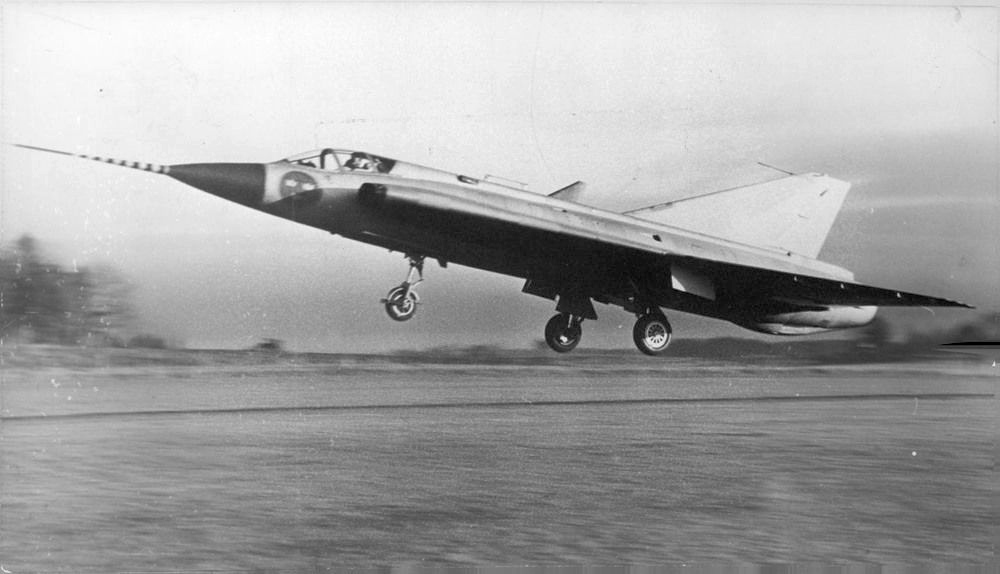
Saab 35B prototype landing after reaching Mach 2 for the first time on 14 January 1960.

As jet fighter technology developed after World War II, Sweden foresaw a need for a supersonic fighter that could intercept bombers at high altitude as well as engage other fighters. During September 1949, the Swedish Air Force, via the Swedish Defence Materiel Administration, released its recently formulated requirement for a cutting-edge interceptor aircraft that was envisioned to be capable of attacking hostile bomber aircraft in the transonic speed range. The original requirement specified a top speed of Mach 1.4 to 1.5, but this was revised upwards in 1956 to Mach 1.7 to 1.8 and then again in 1959 to Mach 2.0.

It had to be flown by a single pilot, yet be capable of conducting combat operations under all weather conditions, night or day, while operating from relatively austere airstrips, carrying all equipment needed to neutralize modern jet bombers. Although other interceptors like the US Air Force's F-104 Starfighter were being conceived at the time, this fighter would have to undertake a role unique to Sweden; the ability to operate from reinforced public roads, which were to be used as part of wartime airbases. The aircraft also needed to be refueled and rearmed in no more than ten minutes by conscripts with minimal training.

SAAB commenced work on producing an aircraft to meet these requirements. Preliminary studies found that the majority of critical issues posed by these requirements could be met with a delta wing configuration. However, to obtain an aerodynamically desirable location, the forward fuselage needed to be extended, making the aircraft too heavy. The optimum solution was thought to be a double delta wing. However, this wing configuration was new and untested, so SAAB's design staff, headed by aircraft engineer Erik Bratt, and a team of more than 500 technicians, constructed a small test aircraft to explore the behaviour of the new wing.

A sub-scale test aircraft constructed in Sweden, the Saab 210 (formally flygplan 210, "aircraft 210"), unofficially nicknamed "Lilldraken" (the little dragon), comprised a test of the double delta wing, and performed its first flight on 21 January 1952. Results produced by these test flights led to an order for three full-size Draken prototypes. On 25 October 1955, the first of these prototypes, not fitted with an afterburner, conducted its maiden flight. According to aircraft publication Flight International, an atypically intensive flight test program was conducted to define and test the type's exceptional speed, range, and complicated systems. The second prototype, equipped with an afterburner, unintentionally broke the sound barrier during its first flight while climbing.

During 1956, the first operational version of the Draken, designated as the J 35A, was ordered into quantity production and the first production aircraft flew for the first time on 15 February 1958. Mach 2 was reached on 14 January 1960 with test pilot Erik Dahlström at the controls of the J 35B prototype. The engine used was a slightly modified British made Rolls-Royce Avon Mk.48A (Swedish designation RM6BE), engine number 3459.

== Design ==
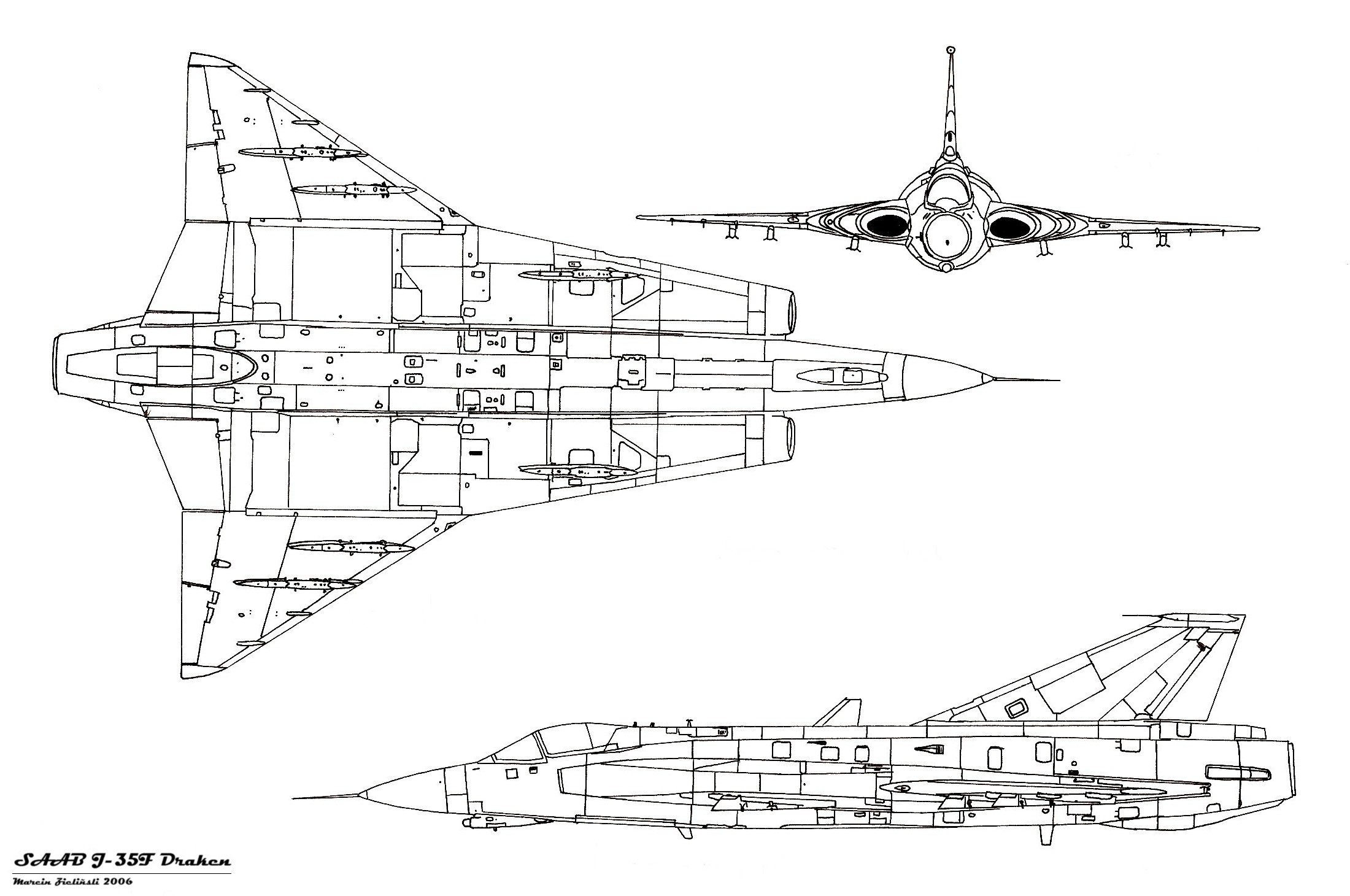

The Saab 35 Draken is a fighter aircraft, equipped with a distinctive double delta wing. According to Flight International, it is difficult to differentiate between the fuselage and the wing. The design anticipates what would later be known as a ‘blended wing-body’. The fuselage has a circular section, and the inboard portion of the wing is a large-chord surface which extended almost to the engine intakes. It was possible to dispense with a tailplane, resulting in a clean, simple overall design. The leading edge of the inner wing was swept back 80° for high-speed performance, and the outer wing 60° for good performance at low speeds.

The cockpit of the Draken featured mostly Swedish-sourced instrumentation. Successive models introduced various improvements to the cockpit fittings, such as the revised canopy and new avionics. For export customers, the Draken was outfitted with a Ferranti-built Airpass II fire-control radar, which was effective for acquiring various air-to-air or air-to-surface targets, along with a ground-mapping mode working in conjunction with the aircraft's navigation systems. Typically, two separate radio units would be installed, along with a high-speed data link and two navigation systems. As there is no natural feedback placed upon the stick, artificial forces were generated by a q-feel system. The Draken was also fitted with a three-axis autopilot. The fuselage of the Draken consisted of two sections, front and rear, joined by bolts. The forward section, which was integral with the intake ducts and neighbouring wing structure, accommodates the fire-control radar, cockpit, nose undercarriage, integral fuel tanks and various systems. The rear portion, which was manufactured as a single piece alongside the rest of the inner wing, contained the engine and afterburner, bag-type fuel tanks, armament, main landing gear, and other systems. The flight control surfaces consisted of a rudder, along with inboard and outboard elevons, the outer sections being fitted with mass-balance weights. Each surface was operated by a tandem hydraulic jack, which was connected to separate circuits. As a weight-saving measure, the hydraulic systems would operate at a line pressure of 210 kp/cm^{2} (20.6 MPa), which would be greater than double the pressure used in the earlier Saab 29 Tunnan.

Propulsion was provided by a single Svenska Flygmotor RM6B/C turbojet engine, a licence-built model of the Rolls-Royce Avon 200/300 engine (also known as Avon Mk.48A and Mk.60). A ram turbine, positioned under the aircraft's nose, provided emergency power, while the engine also featured a built-in emergency starter unit. To reduce its landing distance when required, the Draken was equipped with a drogue parachute. The principal armament was carried externally, up to four AIM-9 Sidewinder air-to-air missiles were carried on hard points beneath the wings and fuselage; alternative payloads include a variety of bombs and rockets, along with provisions for the installation of a pair of 30 mm cannons, located within each of the inboard wing panels. In place of the cannons, additional fuel tanks could be fitted in the same space. For aerial reconnaissance missions, a variety of camera pods could be carried underneath the fuselage.

=== Instability ===
Draken performing a kort parad

Due to a lack of knowledge regarding the then historically unproven design of the J 35's tailless double delta wing configuration, the plane encountered problems at the start of its service life. The unstable design of the double delta wing made it difficult to land early versions of the J 35 as they had to be manually stabilized during landing. The design also allowed the plane to enter a "super stall"; which can be described as an uncontrollable stall affecting aircraft with specific wing configurations when experiencing high alpha numbers. Due to this, J 35 pilots were trained to prevent super stalls, and this training led to the development of the cobra maneuver. The cobra is performed by entering into a controlled super stall state, gaining high alpha and then quickly negating the angle of attack to counter the stall. This forces the airframe to act as an air brake for a few seconds, which rapidly reduces the speed.

The Swedish Air Force is the first air force to have discovered and developed the cobra maneuver. The Swedish named it kort parad (short parry) after the fencing maneuver of the same name, in English known as ‘beat parry’. Initially it was used during training to teach pilots how to counter super stalls, however it also saw secondary use as a combat maneuver which would cause a pursuing enemy fighter overshoot, allowing the pilot to riposte.

== Operational history ==
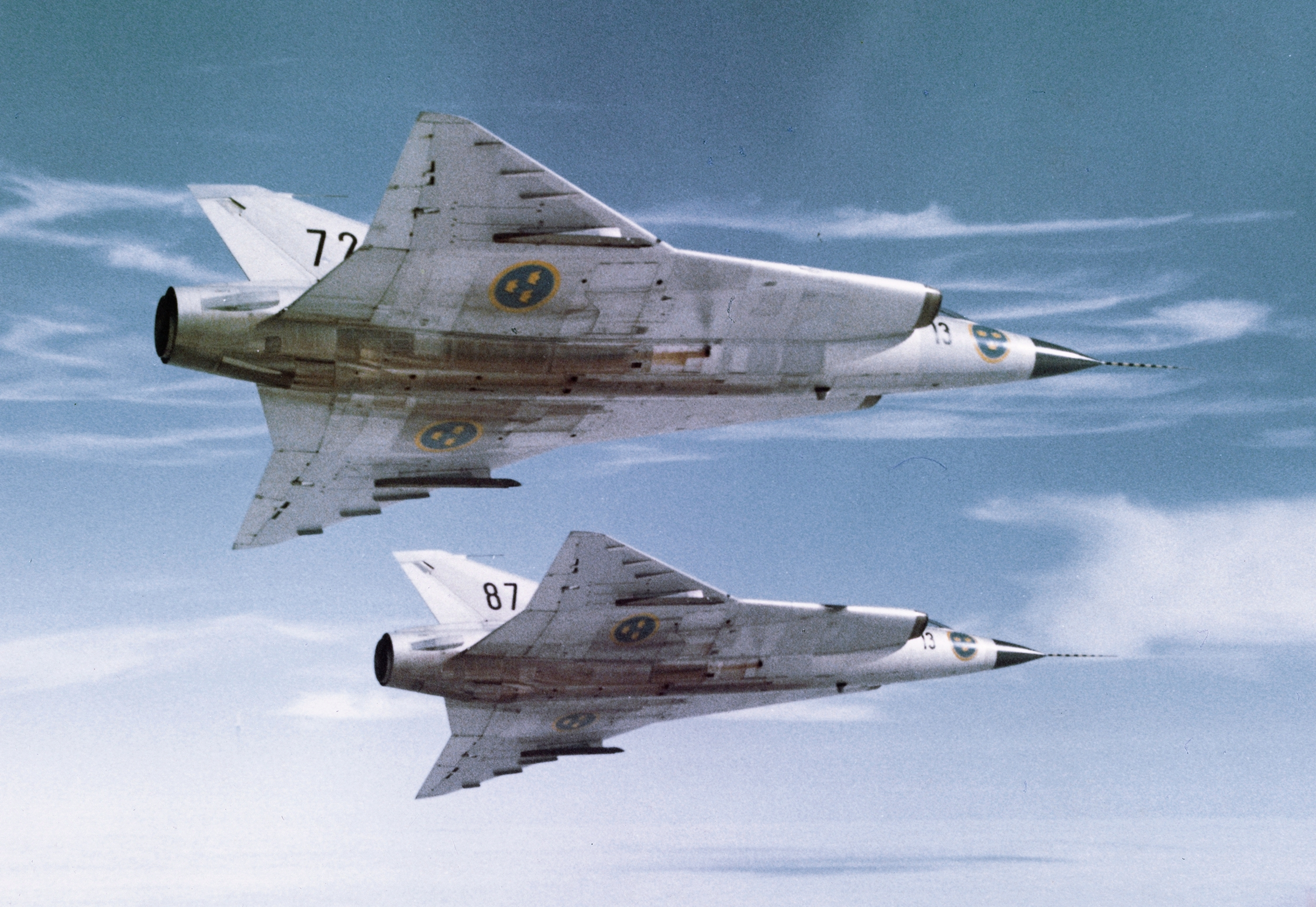
Two J 35A2 Drakens flying over Sweden in the early 1960s

At the end of 1959, deliveries of the J 35A Draken commenced to the SAF, the first unit to receive the type being fighter wing F13, stationed at Norrköping. During March 1960, the Drakens of unit F13 participated in a three-day long exercise, flying by night and day while operating under a state of "highest readiness" throughout. According to Flight International, the introduction to service of the J 35A was "very smooth", and that the scramble and turn-round times had been found to be "most satisfactory". By the end of 1960, multiple wings had been equipped with the Draken and had attained operational status.

Although the J 35 Draken was designed as a high altitude interceptor and not as a dog fighter, it proved to have a good quick-turn capability and high speed at all altitudes, making it a very capable fighter plane. The early models were intended purely to perform the air defense mission. However, to assist pilots in converting to the type, Saab produced a small number of twin-seat J 35C trainer aircraft, the first of which having been completed during December 1959. During 1959, an improved air defence fighter model, designated as the J 35B, was developed, which featured improved performance and equipment over the J 35A. Among other things, it was powered by an improved engine fitted with an enlarged afterburner, a redesigned rear fuselage, a new Saab-built S-7 collision-course gunsight and fire-control radar, and integration with Sweden's STRIL 60 air defence control network.

A total of 651 Drakens were manufactured by Saab. Sweden's fleet of Drakens comprised a total of six different versions, while two additional models of the Draken were offered to prospective export customers. The final model of the Draken to be produced was the J 35F, which was also the final version to remain in Swedish service, then modified to J 35J standard. Its export customers included Denmark and Finland. In May 1985, the Austrian Air Force purchased 24 J 35Ds, which had been refurbished by Saab.

The J 35 Draken design underwent several upgrades. The last of these was the J 35J version, which was produced during the late 1980s; by this point, the Draken had been almost entirely replaced by the Saab 37 Viggen in SAF service. The Draken J 35J was effectively a service life extension programme, which had been initiated as a result of the impending delivery of the new Saab JAS 39 Gripen having suffered several delays. The extension program was intended to keep the Draken flying into the 2000s but, as a consequence of budgetary cutbacks and high maintenance costs being incurred with the type, the Draken was phased out of Swedish service in December 1999, although the aircraft has since remained operational in limited numbers within both military and civilian roles.

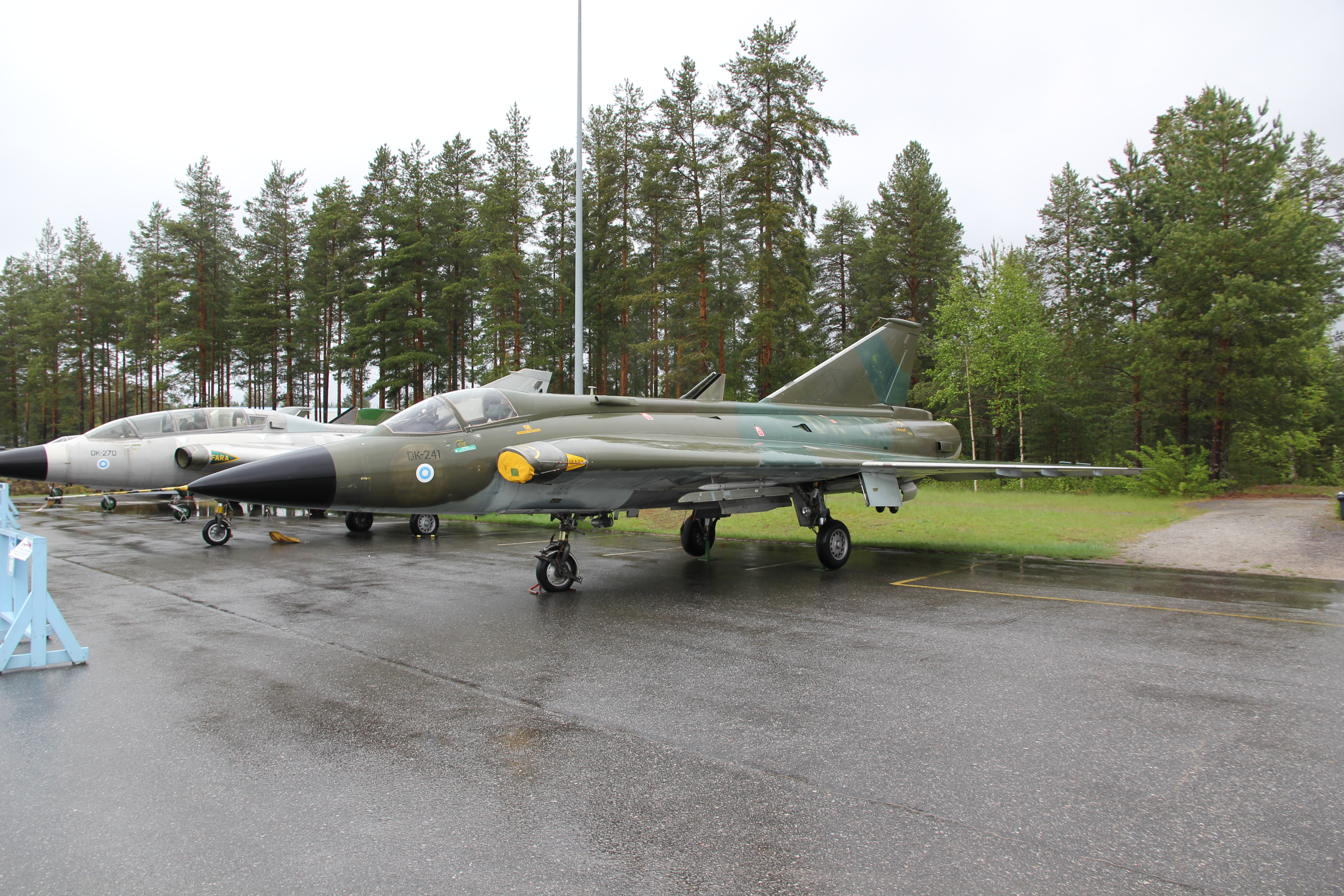
Saab 35F Draken (DK-241), formerly in Finnish service (35FS), at the Aviation Museum of Central Finland. In the background a Finnish Saab 35C two-seat trainer (DK-270) can be seen.

All Drakens functioned as interceptors with limited air-to-ground capability; the sole exception to this rule was the Danish Drakens, which functioned as strike aircraft and were capable of carrying a mixture of AGM-12 Bullpup air-to-ground missiles, electronic countermeasures, and increased internal and external fuel storage. The Danish Drakens were the heaviest of the series to have flown. During 1993, the last of the Danish J 35 fleet were retired.

During the 1990s, Finland updated its 35XS fleet with new avionics, cockpit displays, navigational/attack systems, and electronic countermeasures; these were finally retired in 2000 to be replaced by F/A-18 Hornets.

Austria was the last country to have the Draken in active military service. The first refurbished Draken J-35Ö's was handed over to the Austrian Air Force by 1987. These Drakens were initially armed solely with two 30mm air-to-air cannons, which have proved to be inadequate. This was due to a "missile ban" which stemmed from the Austrian State Treaty of 1955. By 1991, with the start of the Yugoslav Wars along Austria's southern border, there were numerous airspace violations along the southern border caused by the Yugoslav Federal Army; after the fall of the Iron Curtain, Austria declared the relevant article of the treaty to be obsolete. Thus in 1993, a contract for the purchase of AIM-9 Sidewinder was signed with the Swedish Air Force. They were followed from 1998 by a number of improved AIM-9P-5's from Loral Corporation In 2005, these Drakens were retired, having been replaced by former Swiss Air Force F-5 Tiger IIs, while waiting for new Eurofighter Typhoons to take their place in the long term.

In the United States, the National Test Pilot School (NTPS) operated six Drakens that were formerly in Danish service. They were retired in 2009.

== List of prototypes and test aircraft ==
Several prototypes and test aircraft of the Saab 35 have existed over the years. Some have been prototypes for new variants while others have been test platforms for other aircraft.

Fpl 210 "Lilldraken"
Flygplan 210 (fpl 210; "aircraft 210"), (Note: 'Fpl' is the abbreviation for 'flygplan' (aeroplane).) also known as Lilldraken (Little Kite), was a scaled-down proof of concept experimental aircraft to evaluate the double delta wing configuration; though not strictly a Draken variant, it is included here as the first in a series of prototypes.

Existed in two stages:
- Fpl 210A – air intakes on the nose
- Fpl 210B – air intakes moved to the sides of the fuselage

Fpl 35-1 "Stordraken"
Fpl 35–1, also known as Stordraken (Big Kite), was the first original full-scale prototype. It featured an original Rolls-Royce Avon Mk.21 (RM5A) engine with no afterburner and was unarmed.

Fpl 35-2
Fpl 35-2 was the second full-scale prototype. It was similar to the 35-1 and was unarmed. It was used for testing ejection seats among other things. Tests with a tailhook were also performed at some point.

Fpl 35-3
Fpl 35-3 was the third prototype and was the first prototype with cannon armament.

Fpl 35-4
Fpl 35-4 was the series prototype for the Saab 35A.

Fpl 35-5
Fpl 35-5 was the first aircraft built to Saab 35A-series specifications. It featured an original Rolls-Royce Avon Mk.48A (RM6BE) engine and had the same afterburner and tail as the J 35A1 (Adam short) variant. Later it was modified to Saab 35D standard and acted as the Saab 35H demonstrator during the Swiss trials.

Fpl 35-6
Fpl 35-6 was the series prototype for the Saab 35D. It later also served as the prototype for the Saab 35F.

Fpl 35-7
Fpl 35-7 was a test aircraft for the Saab 35F-series. It was outfitted with special recording equipment.

Fpl 35-8
Fpl 35-8 was a test aircraft for the Saab 35F-series but with the earlier non-bird-proof cabin. It was used for rb 28 missile tests and later for testing different radios.

Fpl 35-9
Fpl 35-9 was a test aircraft for the Saab 35F-series but with the earlier non-bird-proof cabin. It was used for among other things ground tests.

Fpl 35-10
Fpl 35-10 was a test aircraft based on the Saab 35B-series but it was originally a J 35A series aircraft. The aircraft was modified with the outer wings of the Saab 37 Viggen strike fighter later in its service life for trials with the Rb 05 (then RB 305) air-to-ground missile.

Fpl 35-11
Fpl 35-11 was a test aircraft based on the Saab 35B-series. It was used for several Saab 35F trials featuring rb 27 and rb 28 missile mockups. Some electronics for the Saab 35D version were also tested. Its final purpose was to trial electronic countermeasures for the Saab 37 Viggen strike fighter.

Fpl 35-12
Fpl 35-12 was similar to the 35-11 and was used to trial different components for the Saab 35D and Saab 35F series.

Fpl 35-13
Fpl 35-13 was a test aircraft for the Saab 35D-series. From 1967 it was used for testing several types of countermeasures for the Saab 37 Viggen strike fighter.

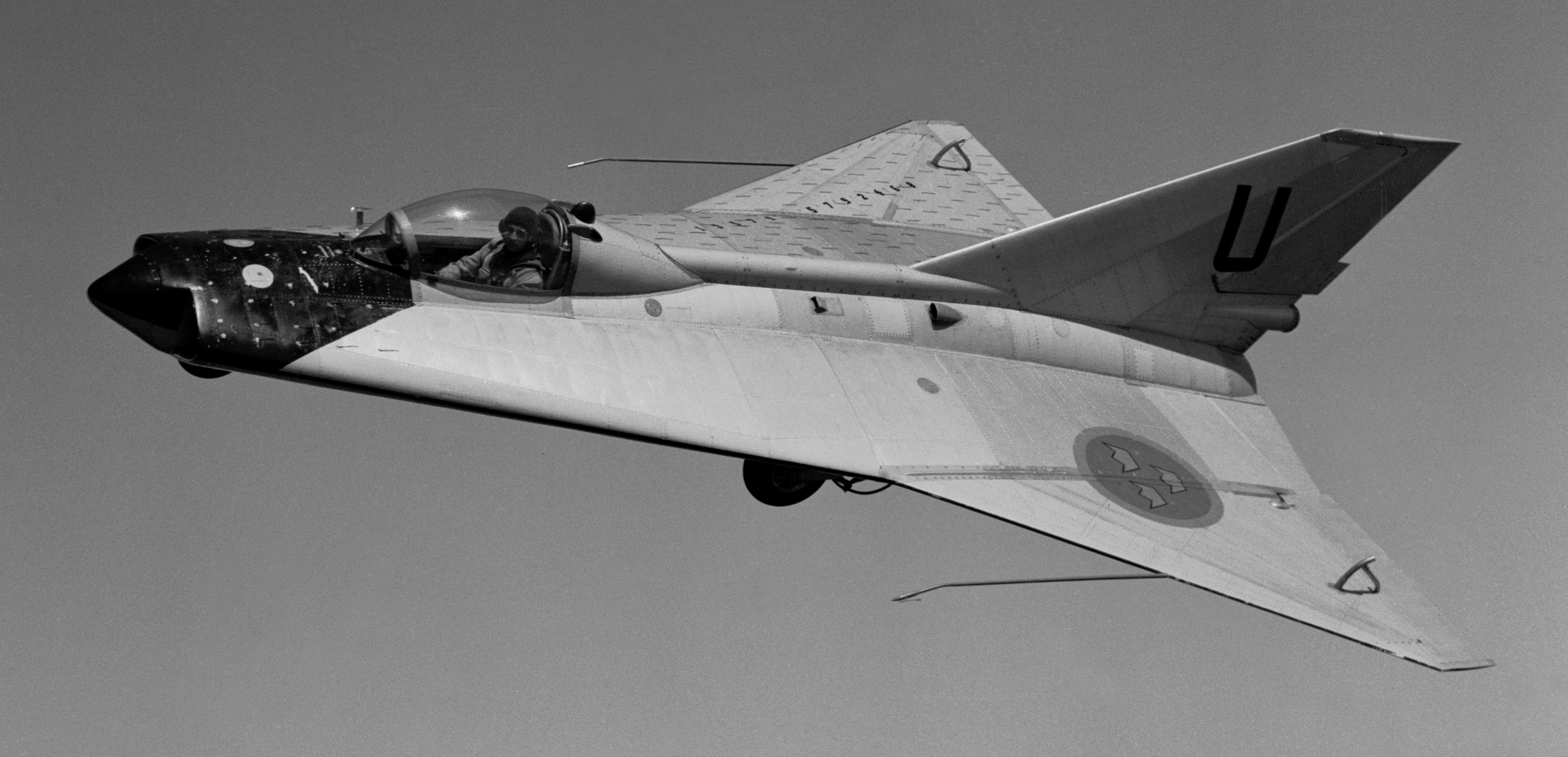
Fpl 210A

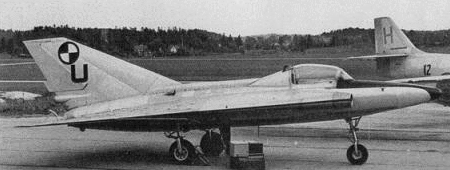
Fpl 210B

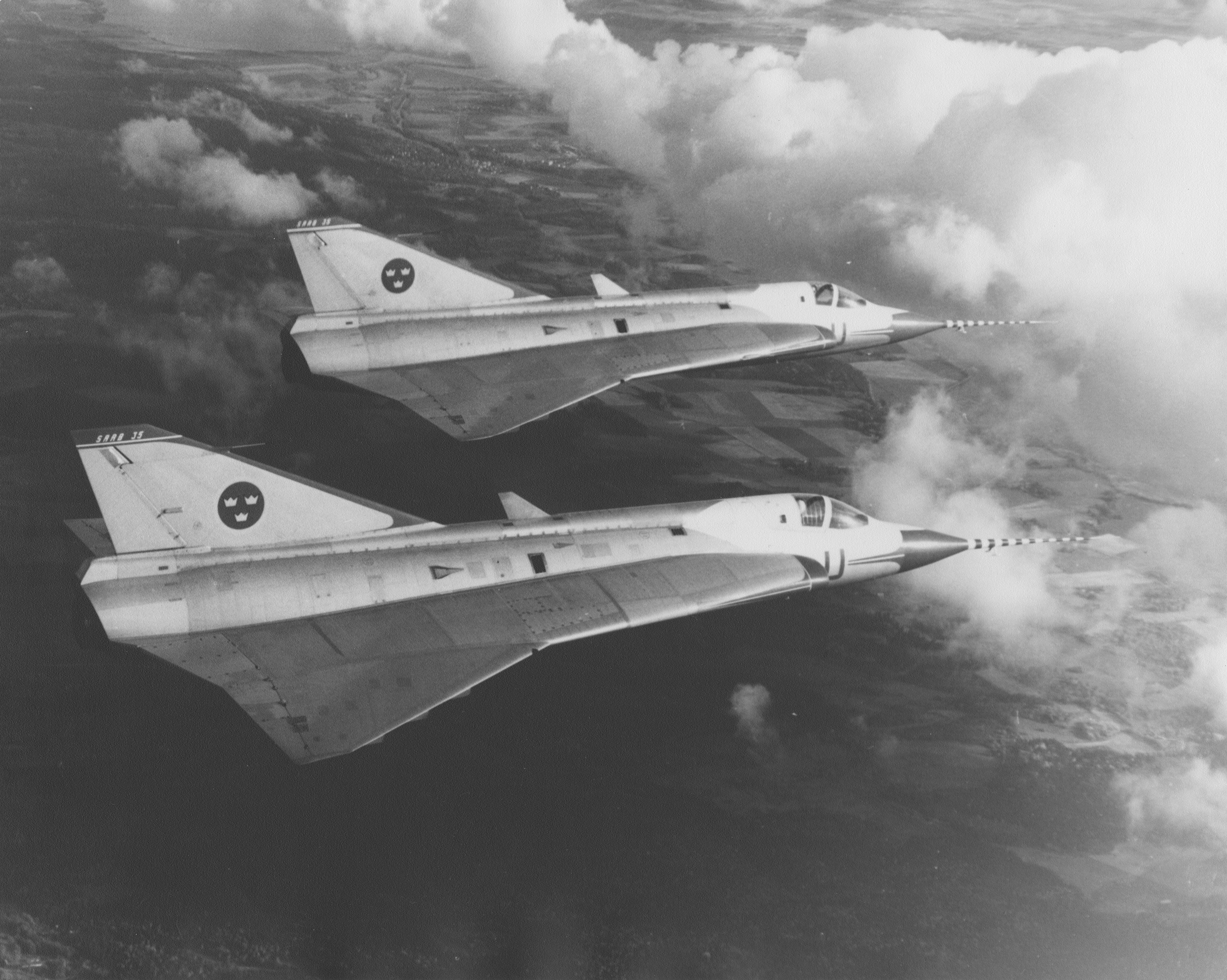
Fpl 35-1 and 35-2

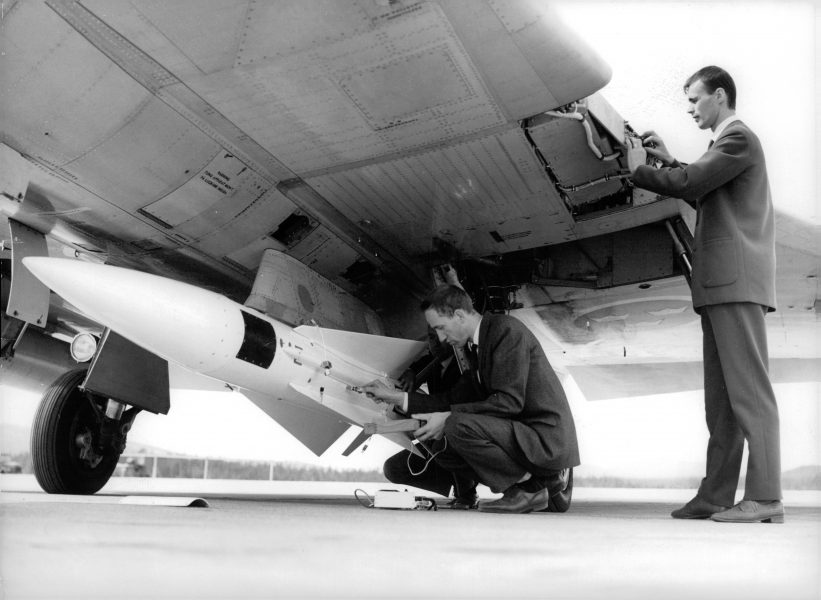
Fpl 35-10 fitted with Rb 05 air-to-ground missile for trials.

== Swedish air force variants ==
=== Saab 35A (Adam) ===
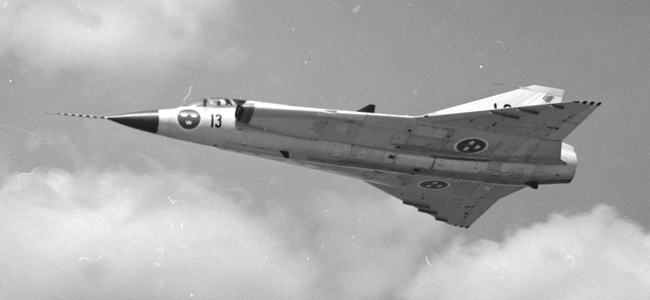
Saab 35A (J 35A1)

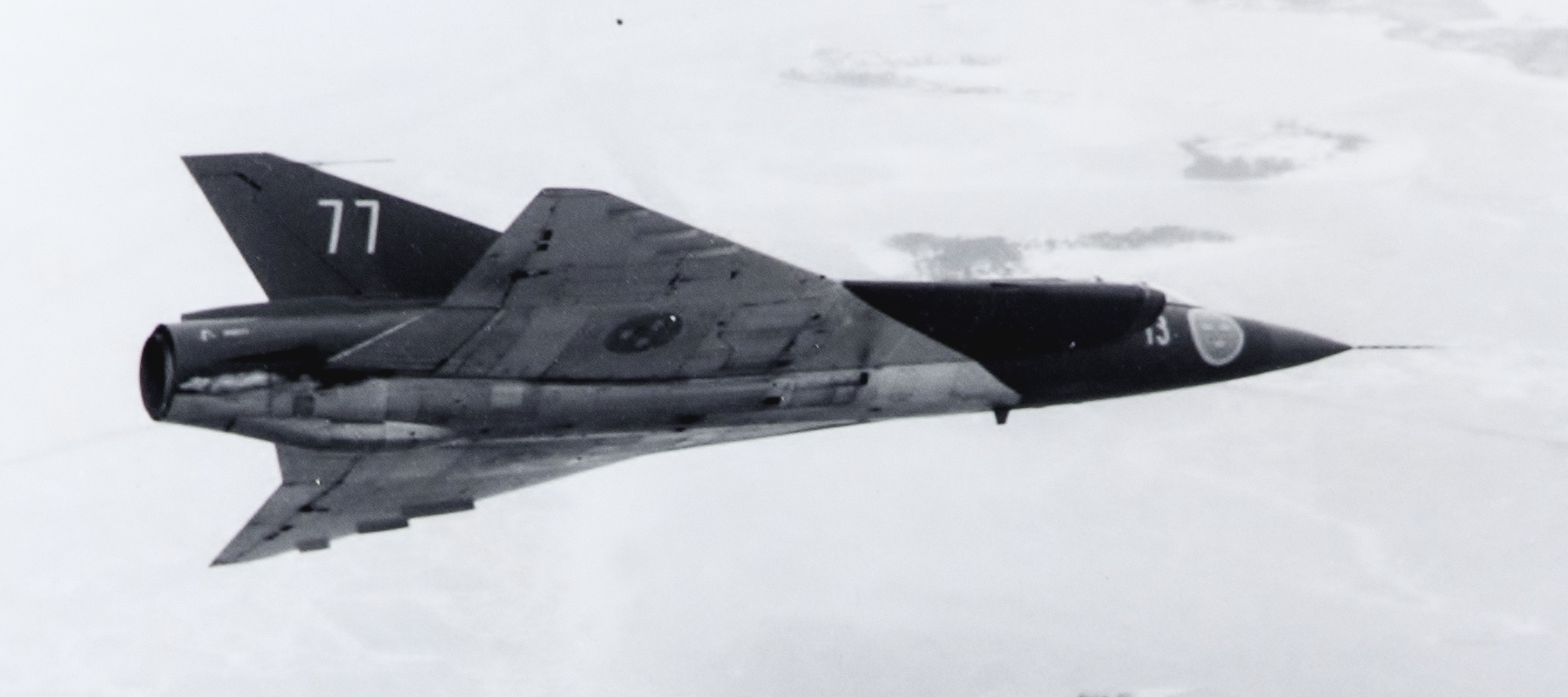
Saab 35A (J 35A2)

Fighter version designated J 35A (Adam). 90 aircraft (35001–35090), including test aircraft, delivered between March 1960 and December 1961. 29 J 35A were ordered on 24 August 1956, with a further 60 J 35A being ordered on 7 February 1958. The initial 40 aircraft delivered in 1960 were delivered without a radar and gunsight. This was corrected in 1961 and 65 Adam were equipped with radar and gunsight in the end. 25 Adam were converted to Saab 35C unarmed two-seat trainers between April 1961 to August 1962.

The Saab 35A was fitted with a license produced Rolls-Royce Avon Mk.48A (Avon 200 series) engine (Swedish designation RM6BS (Note: 'Rm' is the abbreviation for 'reaktionsmotor' (jet engine).)) from SFA (today Volvo Aero) fitted with a Swedish developed afterburner. Two types of afterburners came to be used on the J 35A, resulting in two primary variants:

- J 35A1 (J 35 A:1) / J 35A kort (short) – initial version with a short afterburner (EBK65) (Note: 'Ebk' is the abbreviation for 'efterbrännkammare' (afterburner).) and short tail. Nicknamed Adam kort (Adam short). 65 built.
- J 35A2 (J 35 A:2) / J 35A lång (long) – later version with lengthened tail section to house a new afterburner (EBK66) for additional thrust. Nicknamed Adam lång (Adam long). The longer tail cone unexpectedly reduced drag, but did force the installation of a retractable tail-wheel. 25 built.

The radar on the J 35As was a French Cyrano RA 423 (Note: RA 423 was also fitted to the similar French Dassault Mirage III.) radar from Thompson-CSF (Swedish designation PS-02/A) as the originally planned Swedish radar (PS-03) from LME hadn't been developed in time. The gunsight was an advanced gyro gunsight developed by Saab for both the Saab 32B and Saab 35A called S-6 (Note: 'S' is the abbreviation for 'sikte' (sight).) (later named S-6B). (Note: Sikte 6 as used on the Saab 32B was named Sikte 6A.) It used data from the aircraft's yaw and pitch axis, as well as other sources to give accurate aim for the weaponry. Range data could be taken from the radar or set manually by the pilot.

Weaponry on the J 35A consisted of two fixed 30 mm ADEN cannons (Swedish designation 30 mm akan m/55 (Note: 'Akan' is the abbreviation for 'automatkanon' (autocannon).)) in the wings with 90 rounds per gun. For external ordnance the J 35A had nine hardpoints, eight under the wings and one on the belly. Six of the wing hardpoints were for mounting 13.5 cm srak m/56 (Note: 'Srak' is the abbreviation for 'sprängraket' (high-explosive rocket).) high-explosive air-to-ground rockets. The other two wing hardpoints were for mounting AIM-9B Sidewinder air-to-air missiles (Swedish designation rb 24 (Note: 'Rb' is the abbreviation for 'robot' (missile).)). Rockets and missiles could not be mounted simultaneously on the wings. The belly hardpoint could mount either two rb 24 Sidewinders or a 530-liter drop tank.

=== Saab 35B (Bertil) ===
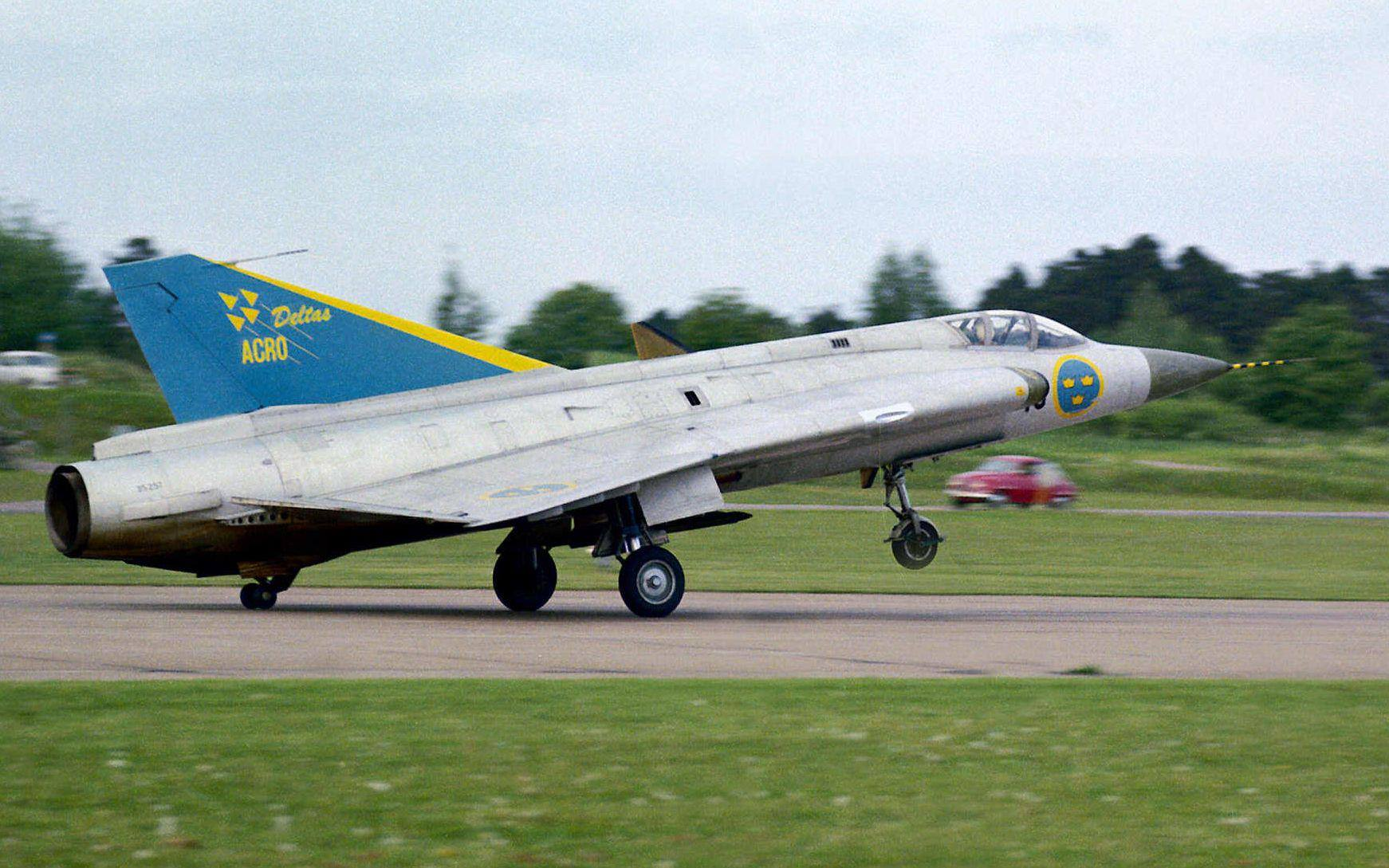
Saab 35B (J 35B´(prim)) in aerobatics team Acro Deltas (1963–1966), 1964.

Fighter version designated J 35B (Bertil). 73 aircraft (35201–35273), including test aircraft, were built and delivered between February 1962 and March 1963. The J 35B was initially planned to be designated J 35B1, before being renamed to just J 35B in January 1960. 72 J 35B1 were ordered on 28 February 1958. 25 of these were to receive the 25 Saab 35A front sections left over from the Saab 35C conversion, but modified to Saab 35B standard.

Due to manufacturing issues, delivery delays occurred for some J 35B subsystems, resulting in that the J 35B initially being delivered with only parts of the planned avionics installed. This resulted in there being two primary sub-variants of the J 35B historically:

- J 35B′ – initial day fighter version of the J 35B. It lacked a radar and featured old Ferranti gyro gunsights taken from scrapped Saab J 29A and B fighters called Reflexsikte 4E/35. These aircraft were designated J 35B′ (i.e. prime, Swedish: prim) to indicate that they were not completed vehicles. However some sources calls these aircraft J 35B1 instead of J 35B′. Even though it lacked a radar it was fully armed with cannons, rockets and missiles. It was also compatible with STRIL 60. 72 built between February 1962 and March 1963.
- J 35B – later all-weather fighter version of the J 35B. Featured a PS-03/A radar and S-7A-2 radar gunsight, as well as the rest of the initially planned equipment and avionics. 69 aircraft converted from the remaining J 35B´(prim) between 1964 and 1966. Aircraft were sent to Saab for conversion between 1964 and 1965 and re-delivered between January 1965 to June 1966.

The base aircraft of the Saab 35B was identical to the J 35A2 and featured the same engine and afterburner, the RM6BS and EBK66. Distinctive from the J 35A, however, was that the J 35B was fully integrated into the Swedish STRIL 60 system; a combat guidance and air surveillance system. As part of STRIL 60 it was also the first Swedish aircraft fitted with a 'control data system' (Swedish: styrdatasystem) which allowed ground-control to send digital orders to the aircraft. These orders were then stored in the aircraft's computers so the pilot could read the order several times and didn't have to memorize the content.

The radar on the J 35B was a Swedish developed radar from LME designated PS-03/A. It was superior and more advanced compared to the French PS-02 used on the J 35A. The gunsight was an advanced radar gunsight developed by Saab for both the J 35B and J 35D called S-7A-2. It used data from, among others, the aircraft's yaw and pitch axis, as well as the PS-03/A radar. It was specifically designed for head-on attacks with air-to-air rockets, something the J 35A did not have access too. Weaponry on the J 35B was for the most part equivalent to the J 35A, but the fixed 30 mm akan m/55 ADEN cannons in the wings had 100 rounds per gun and the aircraft had gained the ability to use 75 mm srak m/57 air-to-air rockets. The rockets were fired from Rakkaps m/57 (Note: 'Rakkaps' is the abbreviation for 'raketkapsel' (rocket pod).) rocket pods mounted in pairs on the Sidewinder belly pylon, each holding 19 rockets.

=== Saab 35C (Cesar) ===
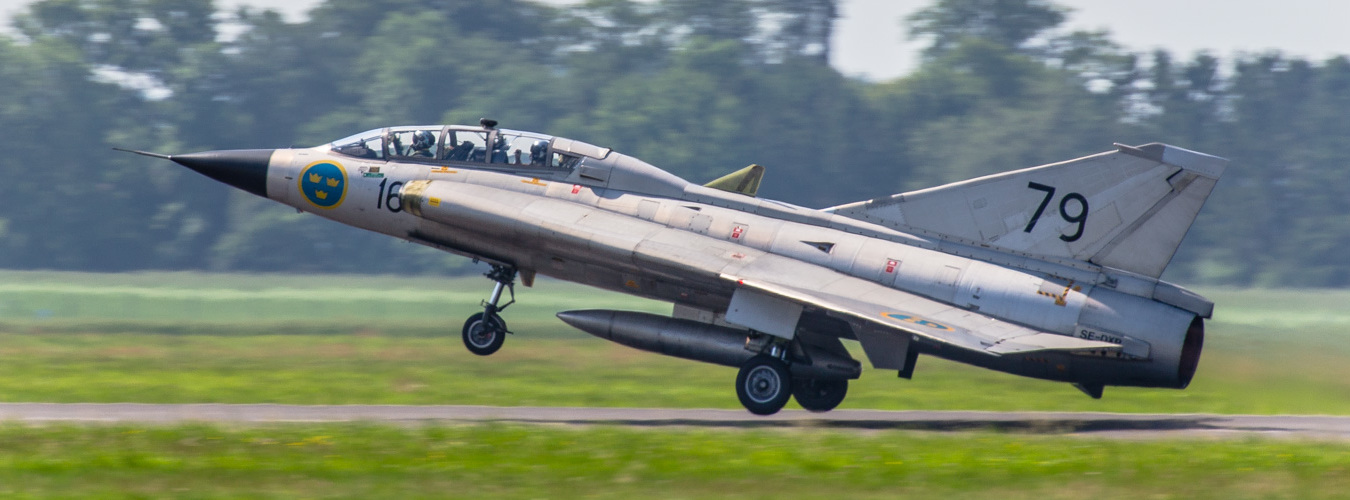
Saab 35C

Twin-seat trainer version designated SK 35C (Cesar). (Note: 'Sk' is the aircraft-prefix for 'skolflygplan' (trainer aircraft).) 25 aircraft (35801–35825), converted from J 35A1s (Adam kort) between April 1961 to August 1962 by rebuilding the front section of the aircraft, not including the prototype (35800), which flew on 30 December 1959, and was privately owned by Saab. The SK 35C was initially planned to be designated J 35C, before being renamed to "SK 35C" in January 1960. The twenty five SK 35C (J 35C) front sections were ordered on 24 August 1956.

The Cesar-version lacked armament but the minor modification meant that the aircraft could easily be converted back to J 35A standard if necessary. However, the prototype (35800) was used by Saab to trial the Rb 05 air-to-ground missile.

=== Saab 35D (David) ===
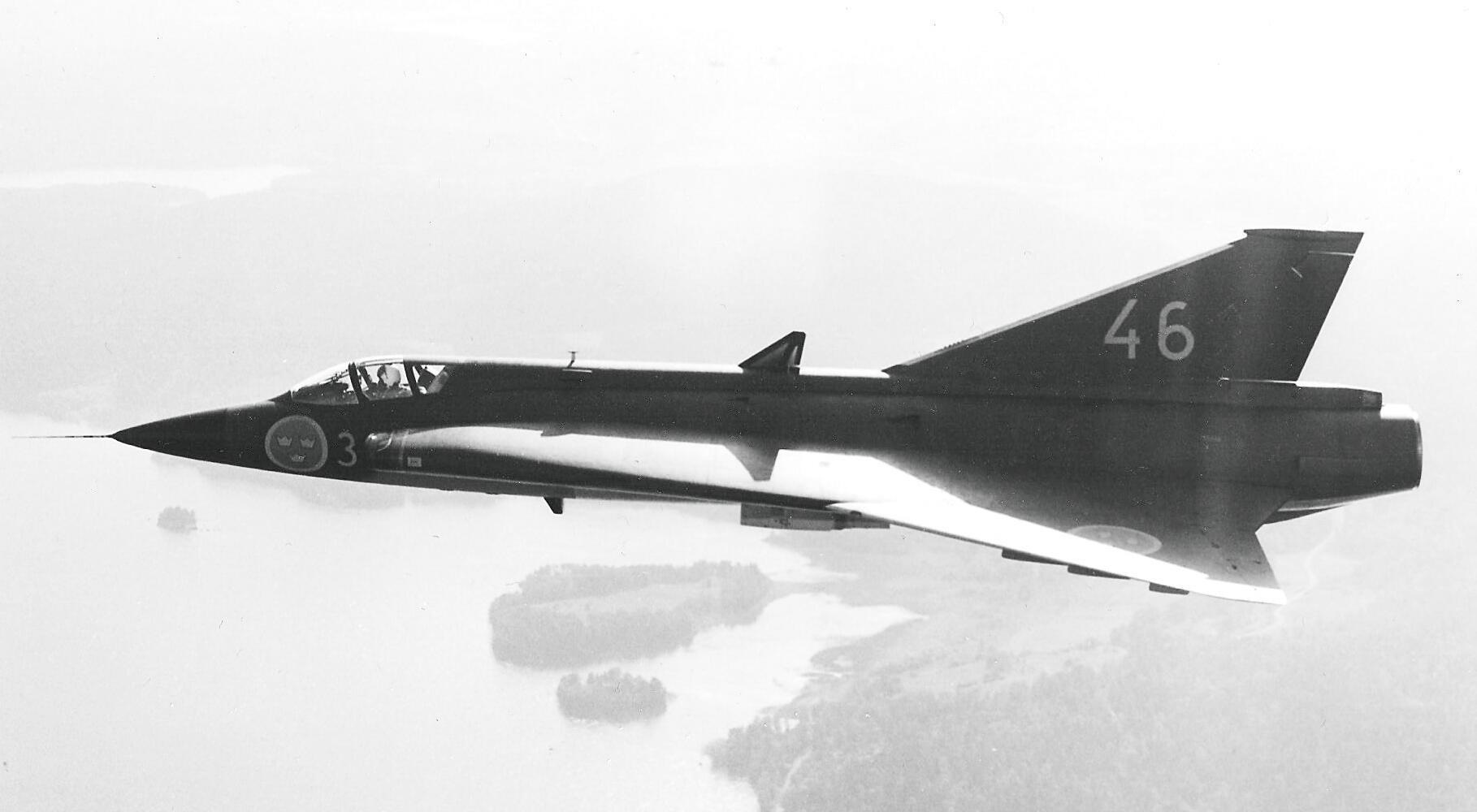
Saab 35D

Fighter version designated J 35D (David). 120 aircraft (35274–35393) delivered between May 1963 and April 1965 in 3 series. The J 35D was initially planned to be designated J 35B2, before being renamed to J 35D in January 1960. 62 J 35B2 were ordered on 15 November 1958, with a further 60 aircraft, meant to be converted to S 35B2 (S 35E) reconnaissance aircraft, being planned to be ordered in November 1960. In the end, only 30 Davids (all of series 1) was converted to S 35E standard, having first served as a fighter aircraft between May 1963 and January 1964.

Due to manufacturing issues, delivery delays occurred for some J 35D subsystems, resulting in that the two initial J 35D series being delivered with only parts of the planned avionics installed. Series 3, however, was delivered with complete avionics, resulting in there being two primary sub-variants of the J 35D initially:

- J 35D1 – initial day fighter version of the J 35D. It lacked a radar and featured old Ferranti gyro gunsights taken from scrapped Saab J 29A and B fighters called Reflexsikte 4E/35. Even though it lacked a radar it was fully armed with cannons, rockets and missiles. It was also compatible with STRIL 60. 30 aircraft delivered as series 1 between May 1963 to January 1964, but quickly put aside for S 35E conversion and 24 aircraft delivered as series 2 between January 1964 to May 1964.
- J 35D2 – later all-weather fighter version of the J 35D. Featured a PS-03/A radar and S-7A-2 radar gunsight, as well as the rest of the initially planned equipment and avionics. 66 aircraft delivered as series 3 between June 1964 to May 1965. Remaining J 35D1 from series 2 were modified to J 35D2 standard throughout 1967 to 1968 by CVV Hässlö (Centrala Flygverkstaden Västerås) and respective air units, after which, the D1 and D2 suffixes were dropped in favour of just D.

The Saab 35D base aircraft differed quite a lot compared to previous variants. For one, it was fitted with the much stronger Rolls-Royce Avon Mk.60 (Avon 300 series) engine (Swedish designation RM6CS), which was license produced by SFA (today Volvo Aero) and fitted with a Swedish developed afterburner (EBK67), which could deliver 77.3 kN of thrust when using its afterburner. Secondly, the David featured increased internal fuel capacity for longer range. It also featured two hardpoints on the belly to be able to mount two 500-liter external drop tanks for even longer range missions (compared to one 530-liter drop tank for the 35A, B and C). Despite having more fuel than its predecessors, the David was the fastest Draken version, capable of accelerating until out of fuel.

In terms of armament and avionics, the J 35D was almost identical to the J 35B. It was fully integrated into the Swedish STRIL 60 system and was also fitted with a 'control data system', allowing the aircraft to receive digital orders from ground control. It also featured the same PS-03/A radar and S-7A-2 radar gunsight as the J 35B. Weaponry on the J 35D was at least initially equivalent to the J 35B. It had two 30 mm akan m/55 ADEN cannons in the wings with 100 rounds per gun, 4 inward hardpoints, 1 under each wing and 2 on the belly, for external air-to-air ordnance, as well as 6 outer hardpoints for air-to-ground rockets. In 1977, however, a new type of air-to-ground rocket became available to the J 35D, the 14.5 cm psrak m49/56 (Note: 'Psrak' is the abbreviation for 'pansarsprängraket' (high-explosive anti-tank rocket).) high-explosive anti-tank rocket (Note: 13.5 cm m/56 rocket retrofitted with 14.5 cm m/49 warhead.) and in 1978, a new type of air-to-air missile, the AIM-9J Sidewinder (Swedish designation rb 24J), later modified with an Ericsson laser proximity fuze, making it equivalent to the AIM-9P-3. Something noteworthy is that the J 35D was the last Swedish Draken variant fitted with 2 guns.

=== Saab 35E (Erik) ===
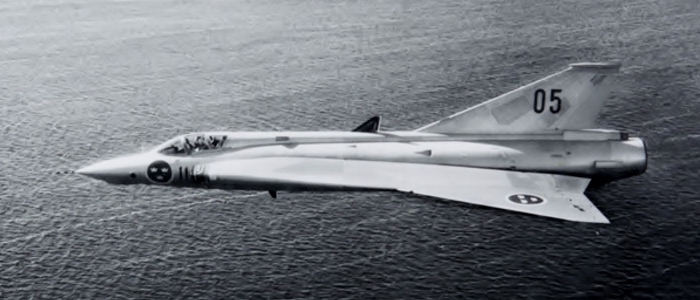
Saab 35E

Reconnaissance version of the Saab 35D designated S 35E (Erik). (Note: 'S' is the aircraft-prefix for 'spaningsflygplan' (reconnaissance aircraft).) 60 aircraft (35901–35960), including test aircraft, built between 1963 and 1968 in 2 series. The S 35E was initially planned to be designated S 35B2, before being renamed to S 35E in January 1960. In 1958 the SAF planned to order 60 J 35B2 (J 35D) fighters in November 1960, which were intended to be converted to S 35B2 (S 35E) reconnaissance aircraft at a later date. In the end, 30 S 35E were produced as new aircraft (35902–35931) and delivered between July 1965 to May 1966 as series 1, while 28 S 35E were converted from J 35D (35932–35959) and delivered between October 1966 to January 1968 as series 2. Two more aircraft, S 35E (35901) and S 35E (35960) were also converted from Davids but never delivered to the SAF.

The base aircraft of the Saab 35E was almost identical to the J 35D and featured the same engine and afterburner, the RM6CS and EBK67. It differed however in that it had no armament or radar, as to make space for 9 Vinten cameras, five in the nose and four in the fuselage, some mounted upright, others mounted obliquely. The aircraft was however fitted with a radar warning receiver and could mount a countermeasure pod named Kapsel KB with chaff and flare dispensers under the wings to increase its survivability. The aircraft had 4 primary hardpoints in total for external ordnance, 1 under each wing and 2 on the belly. For long range missions it was possible to mount up to 4 drop tanks on these hardpoints. For night missions it could carry an active infrared reconnaissance pod designed by EG&G and fitted to a belly hardpoint.

=== Saab 35F (Filip) ===
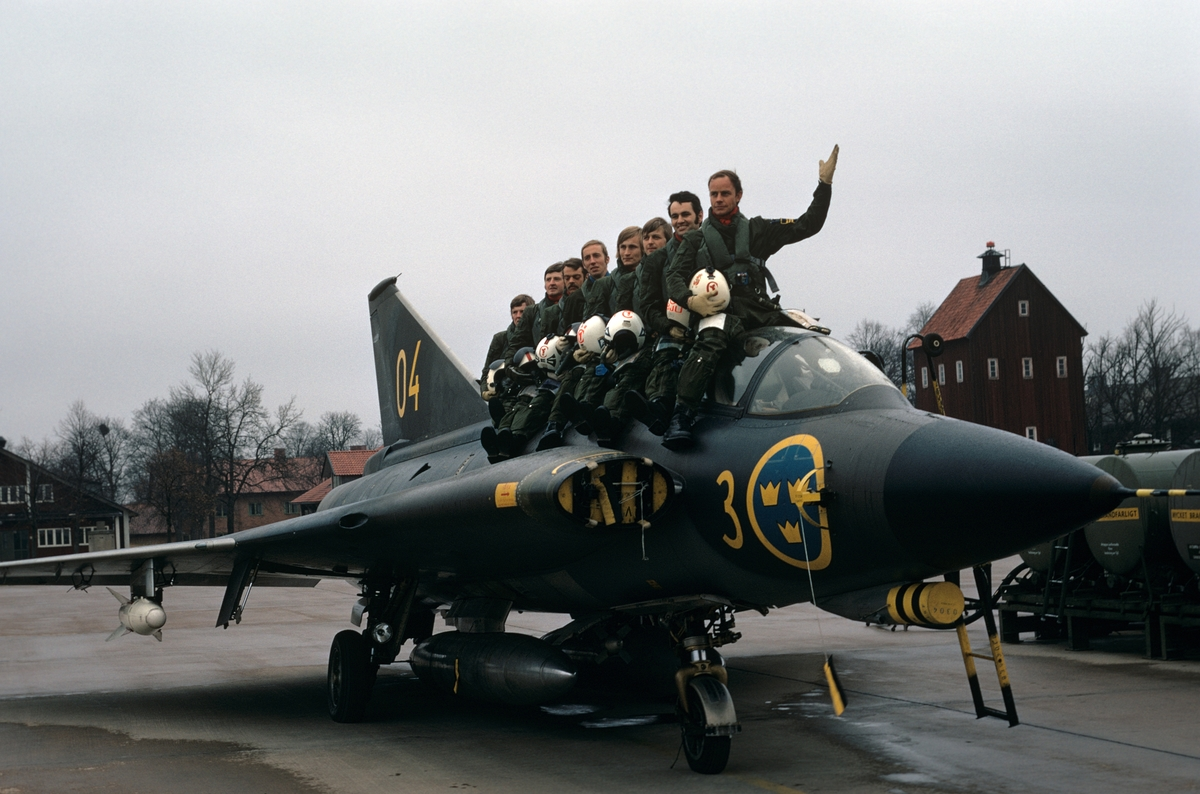
Saab 35F (J 35F2)

Fighter version designated J 35F (Filip). Delivered between 1965 and 1972, total production: 230. This variant had improved electronics and avionics, e.g. integrated radar, aim and missile systems, introducing the capability to use semi-active radar homing (SARH) and infrared homing (IR) versions of the Hughes Falcon missile, rb 27 (HM-55 / AIM-26B export) and rb 28 (HM-58 / AIM-4C export) respectively, originally intended for the J 35D. To make space for more avionics, the left cannon was removed, with ammunition increased to 120 rounds for the right cannon as compensation.

The J 35F existed in two primary variants:

- J 35F1 – initial version without an infrared search and track sensor under the nose.
- J 35F2 – later version with a Hughes N71 infrared search and track sensor under the nose (IR-spanare 71N). This was a change in the production line from the no. 35501 airframe. The Hawé mods I & II were carried out on the P/S-01/011 radar sets in the early 1980s to improve resistance to ECM.

=== Saab 35G (Gustav) ===
Attacker version designated J 35G (Gustav). 70 aircraft suggested to be converted from J 35Ds but the project was cancelled early on.

The Gustaf version was specifically going to be able to carry the Saab Rb 05 air-to-ground missile.

=== Saab 35J (Johan) ===
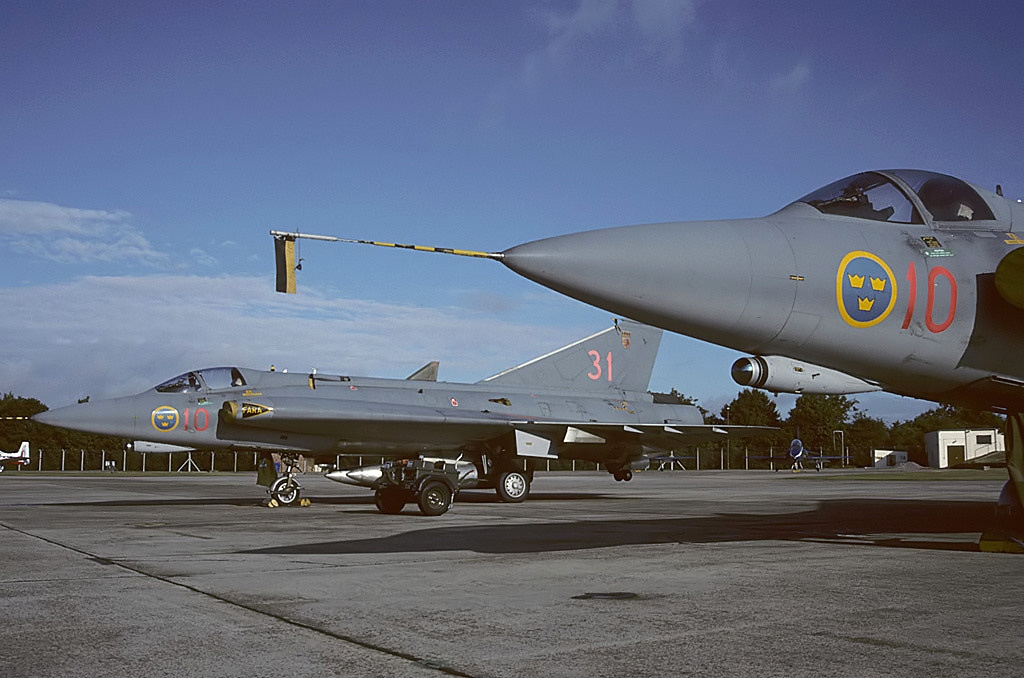
Saab 35J (without G-pylons)

Fighter version designated J 35J (Johan). In 1985 the Swedish government decided to modify 67 J 35F2s to the J 35J standard. The aircraft received a longer lifespan, modernized electronics, a modernized cannon, two additional hardpoints under the intakes for extra AIM-9 Sidewinder pylons (balk G, "pylon G") and increased external fuel capacity. The modification took place between 1987 and 1991. The final operational J 35J flew for the last time in 1999.

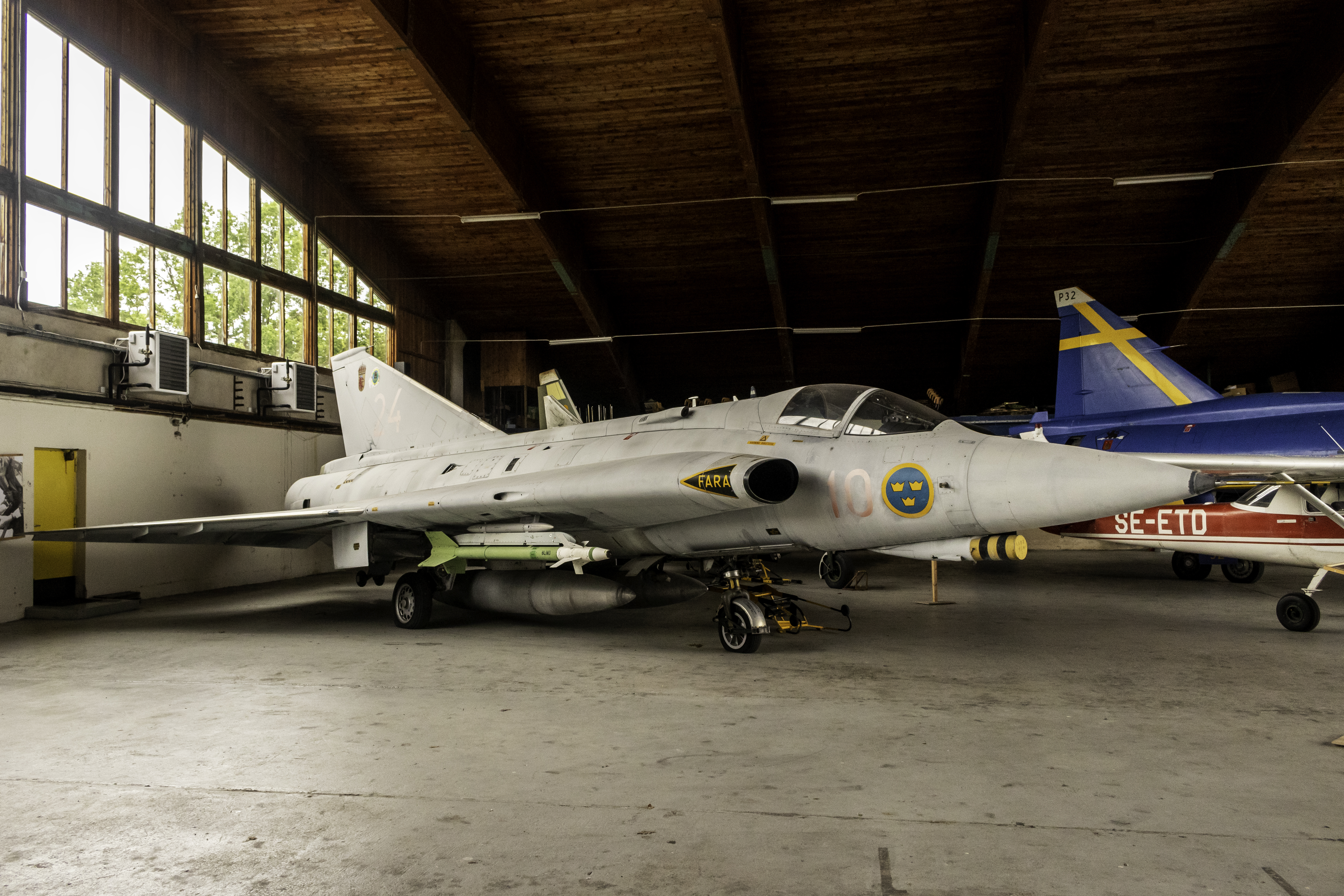
J 35J with G-pylons under the intakes.

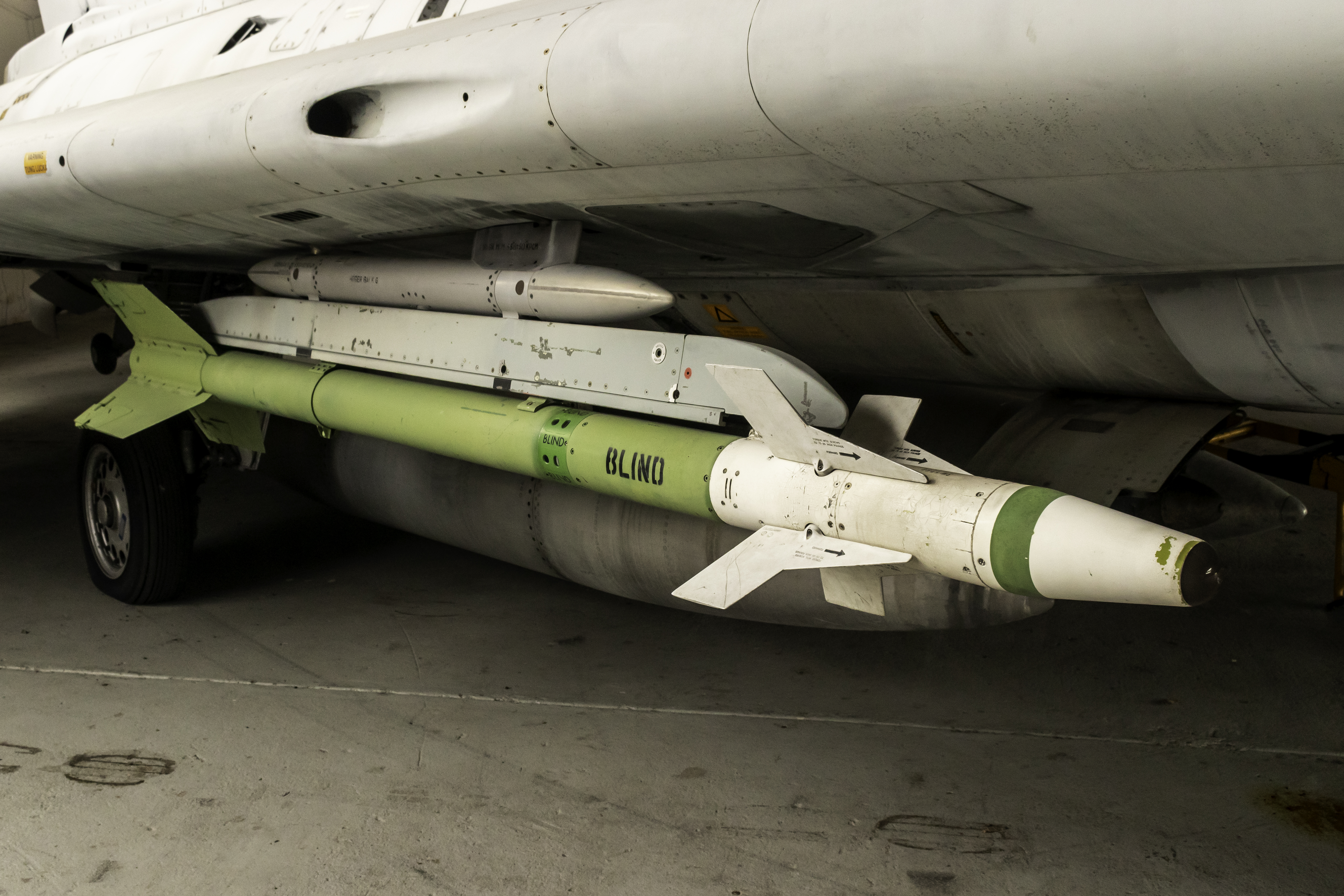
Pylon G (balk G) with an inert rb 24J (AIM-9J/P-3).

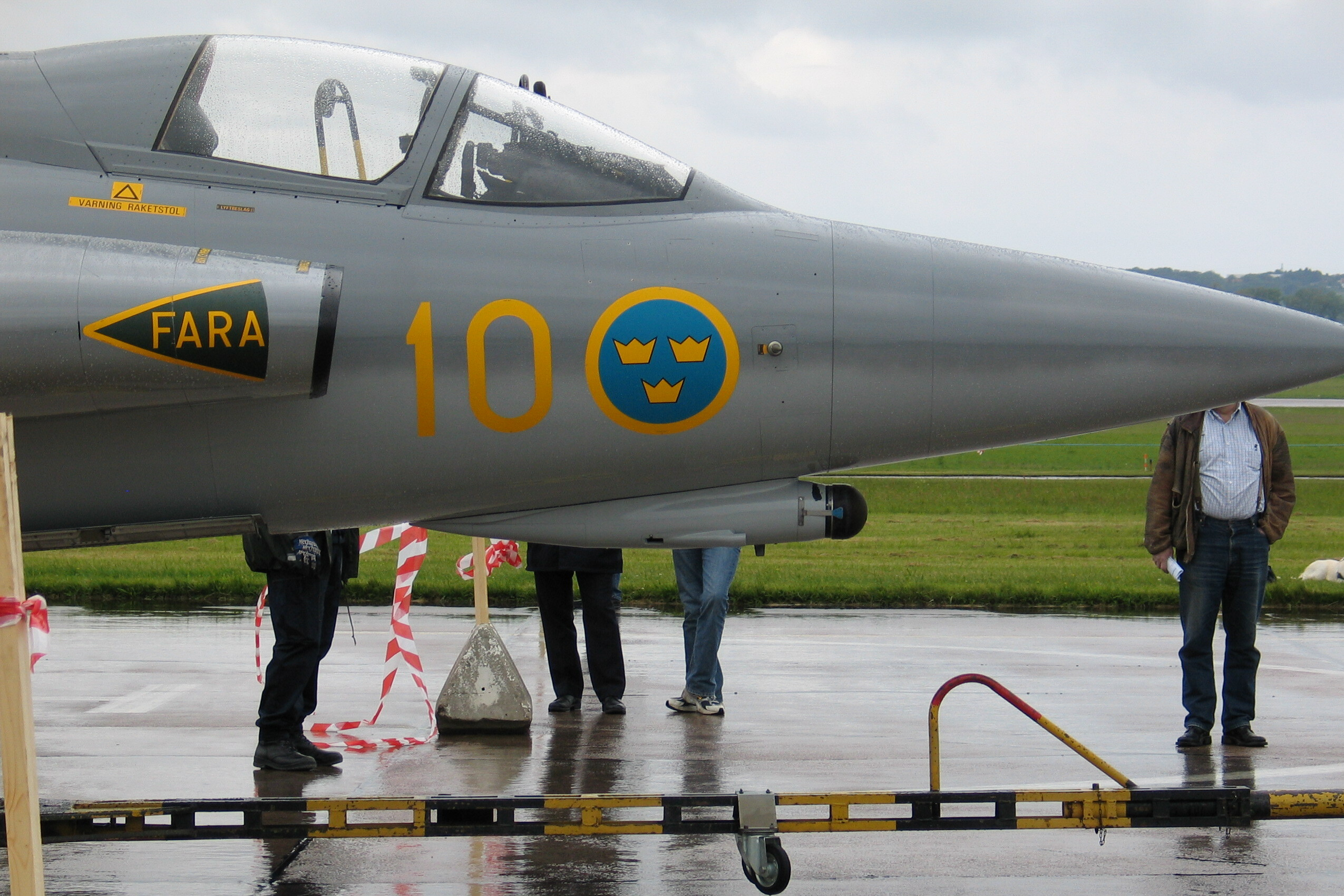
Hughes N71 IRST tracker (IR-spanare 71N) on the J 35J.

=== Proposed modifications ===
Before it was decided to develop the JAS 39 Gripen in the 1970s, studies were undertaken on modification for low flight hour J 35F airframes.

- 35 MOD Level 1b – Essentially the aircraft that became the J 35J.
- 35 MOD Level 4 – The most ambitious modification in the program. The proposed modifications were new outer wing, additional weapon stations, RBS 15 capability, the addition of canards by the air intakes for increased maneuverability and maximum take-off weight increased to 15 000 kg.

== Export variants ==
Export attempts of the Saab 35 started even before the aircraft had finished development in Sweden. During the late 1950s, Saab would offer the aircraft to, among others, the West German Air Force, the Austrian Air Force and the Swiss Air Force.

=== Saab 35H (Helvetia) ===
Saab 35H (Helge) was a proposed export version of the J 35D for the Swiss Air Force in 1958. H stands for Helvetia, Switzerland in Latin. One demonstrator built from the Fpl 35-5 prototype. Competed and lost out against the Dassault Mirage IIIS. None sold or delivered. The trial and procurement of the Mirage III was however faulty, leading to a scandal after severe budget overruns. The Swiss Air Force commander, the chief of the general staff and the minister of defence were forced to resign as a result. During trials the Saab 35H demonstrated a climb rate 20–40% superior to the Mirage III and had a 35% shorter take-off run.

=== Saab 35X (Export) ===
Saab 35X (Xerxes) was a series of export variants of the J 35D and J 35F that Saab offered throughout the 1960s, 1970s and 1980s. X stands for export. The Saab 35X was offered to Belgium in 1967, Argentina in 1968, Venezuela in 1969, Chile in 1971, Singapore in 1975, Tunisia in 1976 and Malaysia in 1980. However, none of the aforementioned countries purchased the Saab 35 in the end.

=== Saab 35XD (Export Danmark) ===
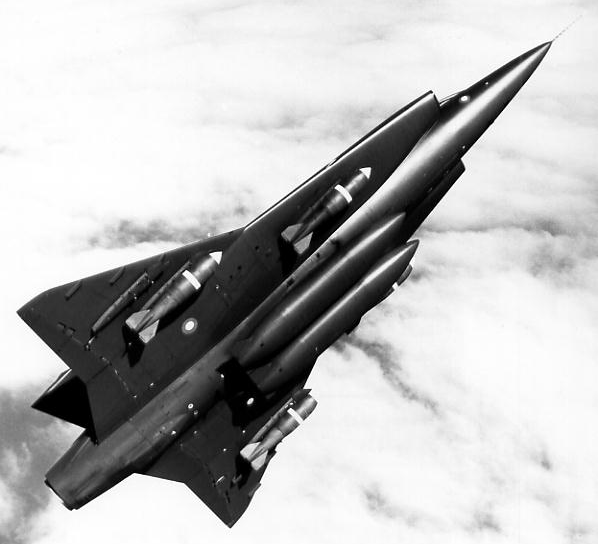
Saab 35XD (F-35 Draken), fitted with 4 × 1,000 lb (453.59 kg) bombs.

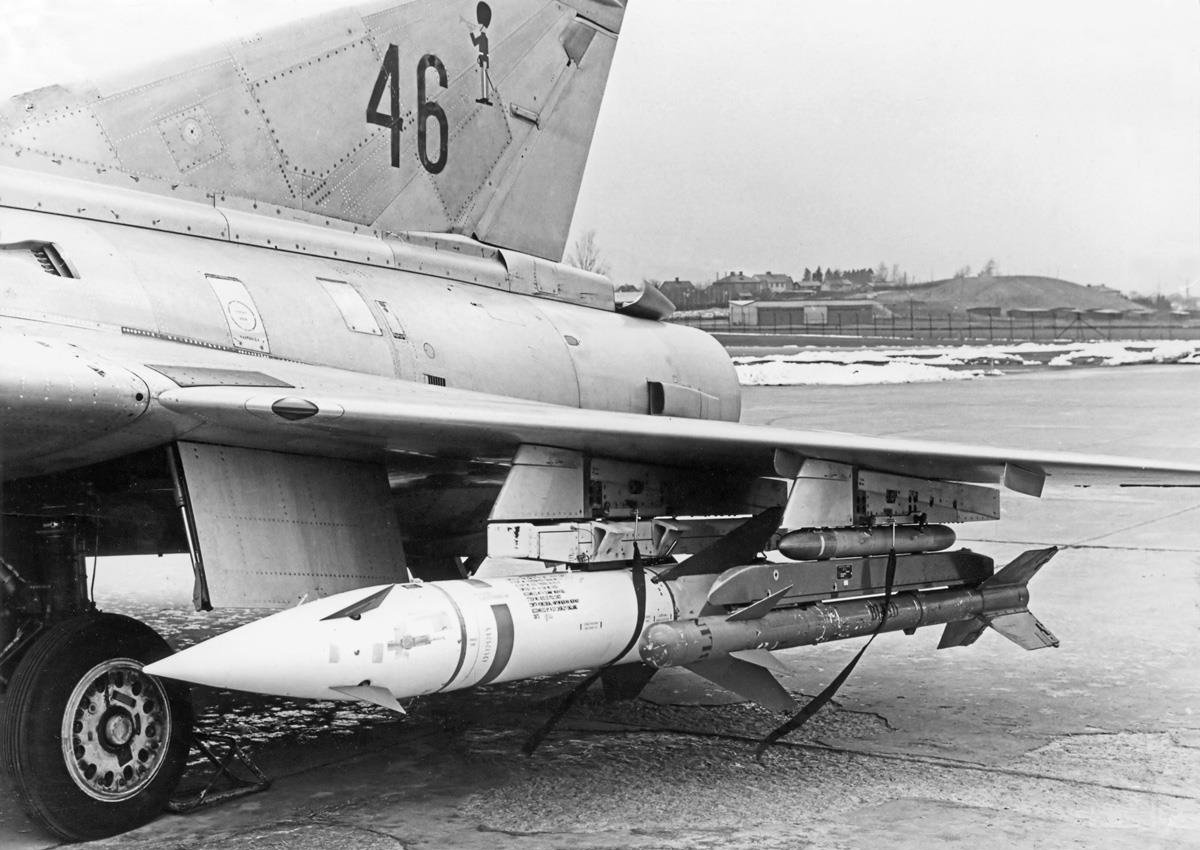
Saab 35XD prototype fitted with one AGM-12B Bullpup air-to-ground missile and AIM-9B Sidewinder air-to-air missile under each wing.

Saab 35XD (Xerxes David) was an export fighter bomber version of the Saab 35F for the Royal Danish Air Force. X stands for export and D for Denmark. It competed and won against the Mirage III and the Northrop F-5 in 1968.

Three variants of the Saab 35XD were produced, all with similar ordnance capabilities:

- F-35 (Saab A 35XD) – single-seat attack version. 20 built
- RF-35 (Saab S 35XD) – single-seat reconnaissance version with a camera nose similar to the Saab 35E. Could not equip the AGM-12B Bullpup. 20 built
- TF-35 (Saab SK 35XD) – two-seat trainer aircraft with only one cannon. 11 built (6 initially, 5 later)
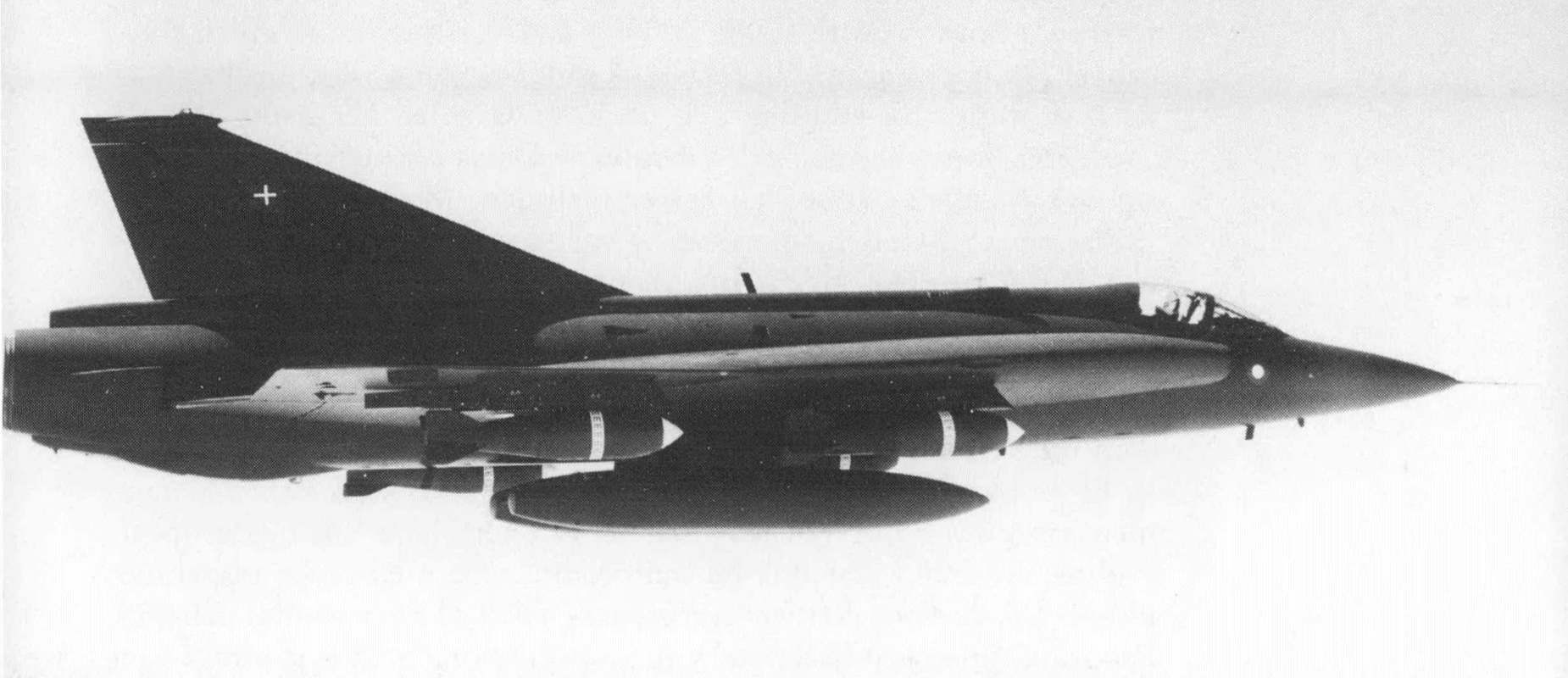
F-35 Draken (pre-WDNS)

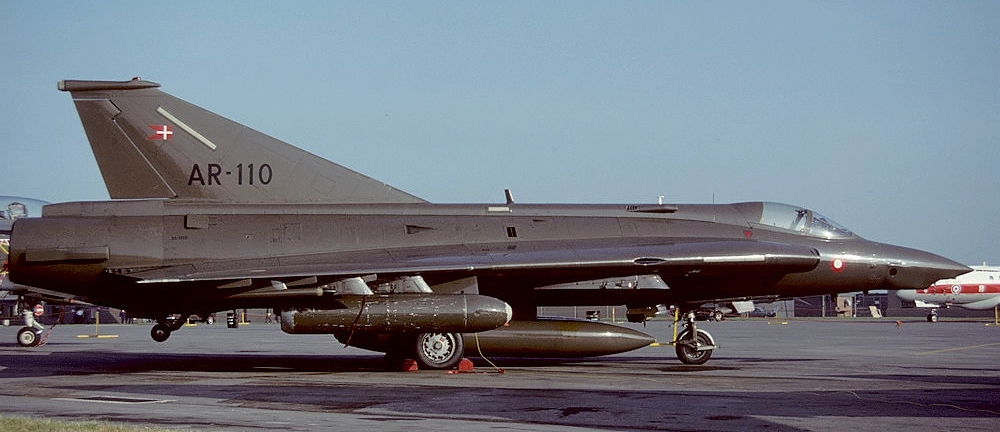
RF-35 Draken (pre-WDNS)

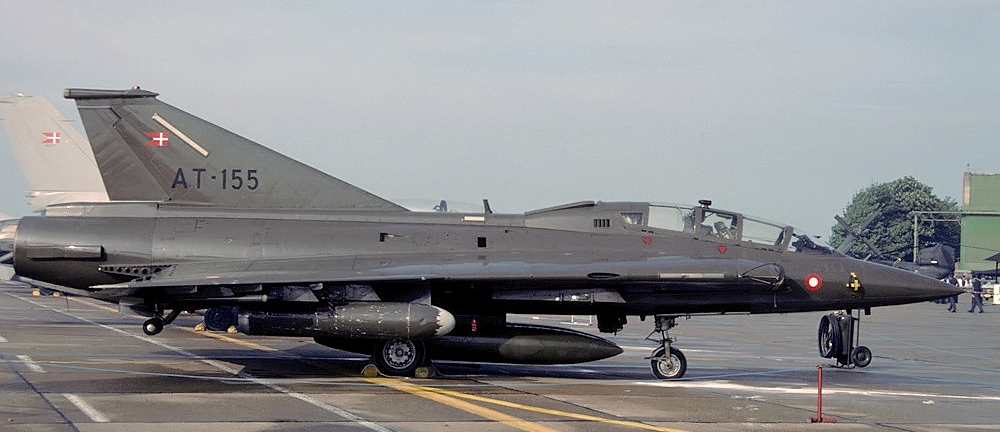
TF-35 Draken (pre-WDNS)
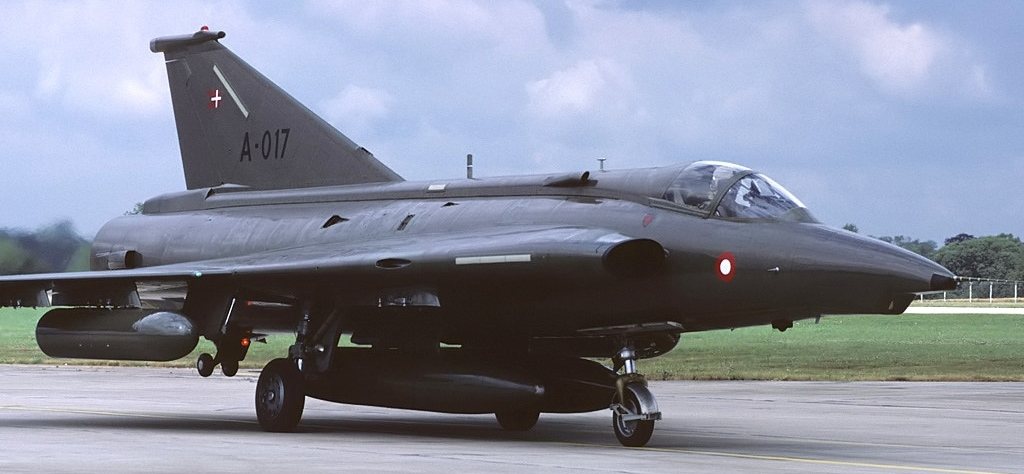
F-35 Draken (post-WDNS)

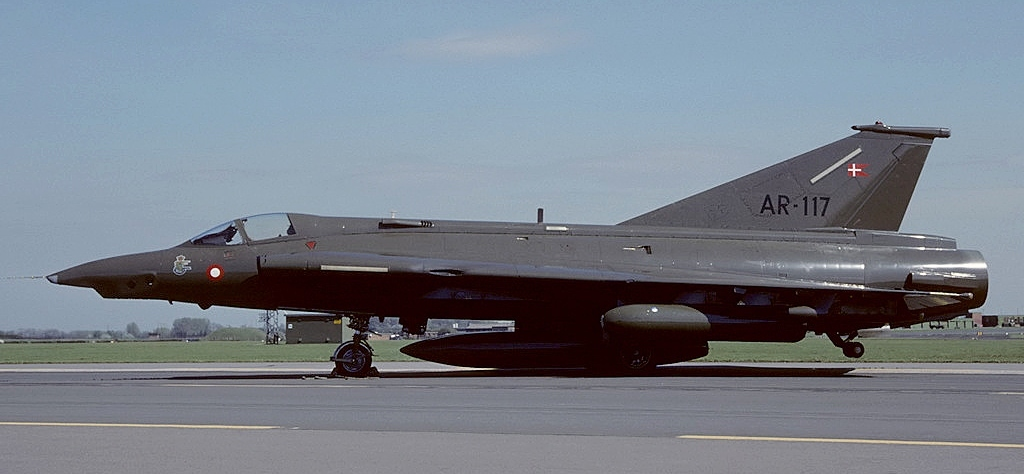
RF-35 Draken (post-WDNS)

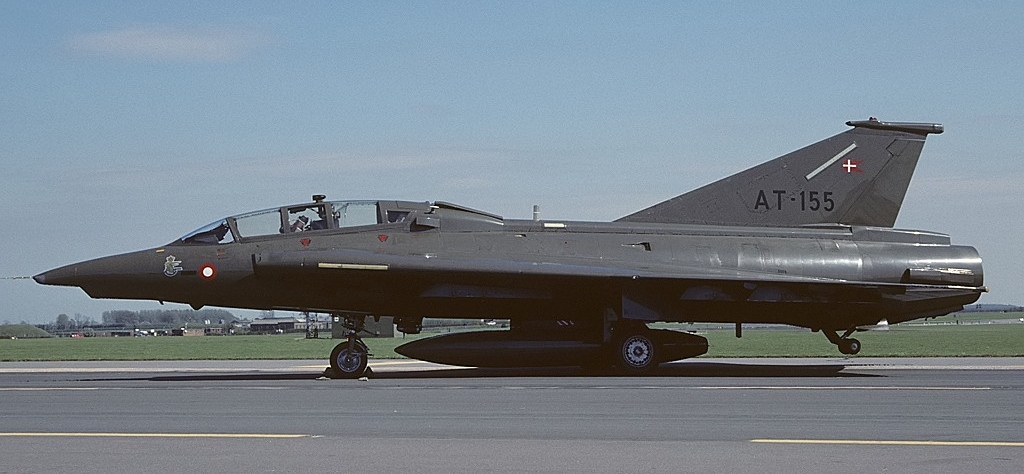
TF-35 Draken (post-WDNS)

Denmark wanted to acquire a third and fourth Saab 35XD squadron (23–46 aircraft) following the initial purchase and prices were handed over 14 August 1970. Negotiations continued during the spring of 1971 and an offer was made on 1 May 1971. The Danish interest focused on a radar by LME called SAX 500, a new navigation system and an effective ordnance amining system, such as the Saab BT-9. However, due to cutbacks of the Danish Air Force made during he winter 1970/1971 (from 7 squadrons to 4) it was not possible to acquire these aircraft.

The Saab 35XD was heavily modified to make it into a fighter bomber aircraft; compared to the Swedish versions the outer wings where completely redesigned and the aircraft featured 9 hardpoints in total. It could carry a wide array of NATO ordnance, such as 10,000 lb (4,535.92 kg) of NATO bombs, but also Mighty Mouse rockets and AGM-12B Bullpup missiles. For air defence it featured two 30 mm ADEN cannons and could also mount two AIM-9B Sidewinders (later AIM-9N-2s) on the utmost hardpoints. It lacked a radar and had a counterweight in the nose instead. The Saab 35XD was however fitted with a ballistic computer from Saab called BT-9R. It worked with both bombs and rockets and even allowed for toss bombing.

During the 1970s the Danish Drakens received new altimeters, US ALR-45 radar warning receivers (later upgraded to ALR-65) and chaff and flare dispensers in their tail cones. During the 1980s the Danish Drakens got an upgrade called WDNS (Weapon Delivery and Navigation System). This upgrade most notably included a Marconi 900 Series HUD and a Ferranti LRMTS (laser rangefinder and marked target seeker) which required a new nose to be installed on the F-35 and TF-35. This nose was the same as the one used on the RF-35 but lacked camera windows on the side. Electronic warfare capability was also improved as the Danish Drakens were fitted with ALR-69 radar warning receivers (with six antennas on the vertical fin, two on each wingtip and two under the nose) and the ability to carry ALQ-162 jammer pods under the wingtips. The last upgrade was completed in 1986 and updated the systems for weapon aiming and navigation accuracy to a similar capacity to those of the Danish Air Force's General Dynamics F-16 Fighting Falcons. Somewhere during its service life the Danish Drakens also lost their ability to mount AGM-12B Bullpups.

==== Saab 35FD (Filip Danmark) ====
Following the cancellation of more Danish 35XD aircraft in 1971, Saab offered the Danish Air Force two low-price Draken ground attack variants based on the Saab 35F, called FD (for Filip Denmark), modified approximately to 35XD standard, but with only 6 pylons (position 1, 3, and 6).

- Saab 35FD LÅG ("low") – single-seat attack version for Denmark based on the Saab 35F, with similar capabilities to the early F-35.
- Saab 35FD HÖG ("high") – single-seat attack version for Denmark based on the Saab 35F, with a Weapon Delivery and Navigation System (WDNS) like the later F-35.

For both types, a radar of the type Ericsson PS-01 could be added as in the Swedish J 35F. Action radius for the two versions were 238 nautical miles with 2 x AIM-9 and 2 x 500 liter droptanks (Swedish model) with 10% fuel reserves. In fighter-bomber configuration it was 221 nautical miles with four Mark 82 Snake Eye bombs and two 1275 liter droptanks (Danish model) with 10% fuel reserves.

The Saab 35FD project was cancelled in October 1971 and no aircraft were acquired, however, on 10 April 1979, Saab presented the Danish Defence Command a new deal for a delivery of 35FD planes. These were based on used J 35F airframes. At this point the F-16 deal had been signed, so there was no interest from the Danish side.

=== Saab 35XS (Export Suomi) ===
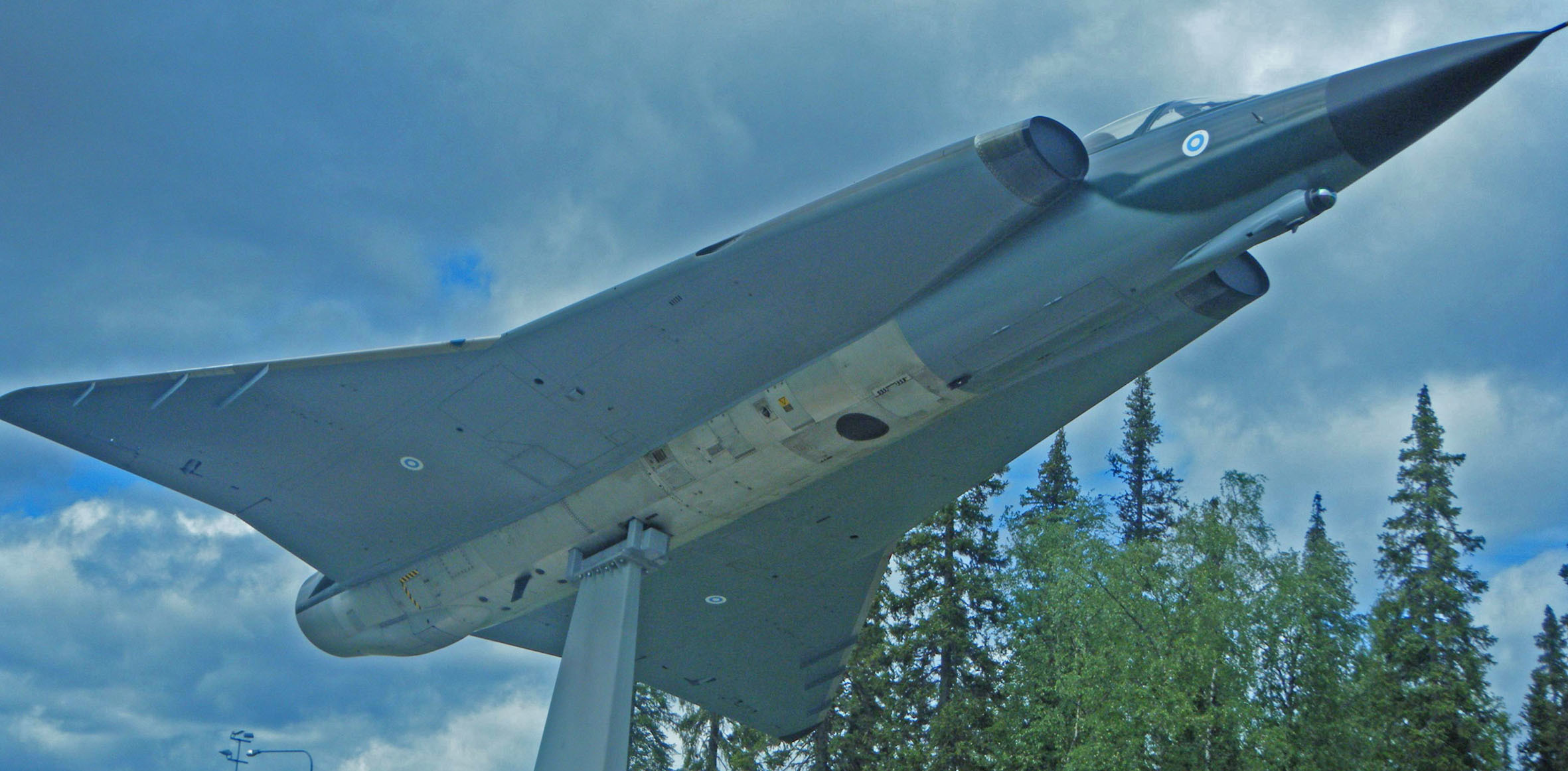
Finnish 35S (DK-203)

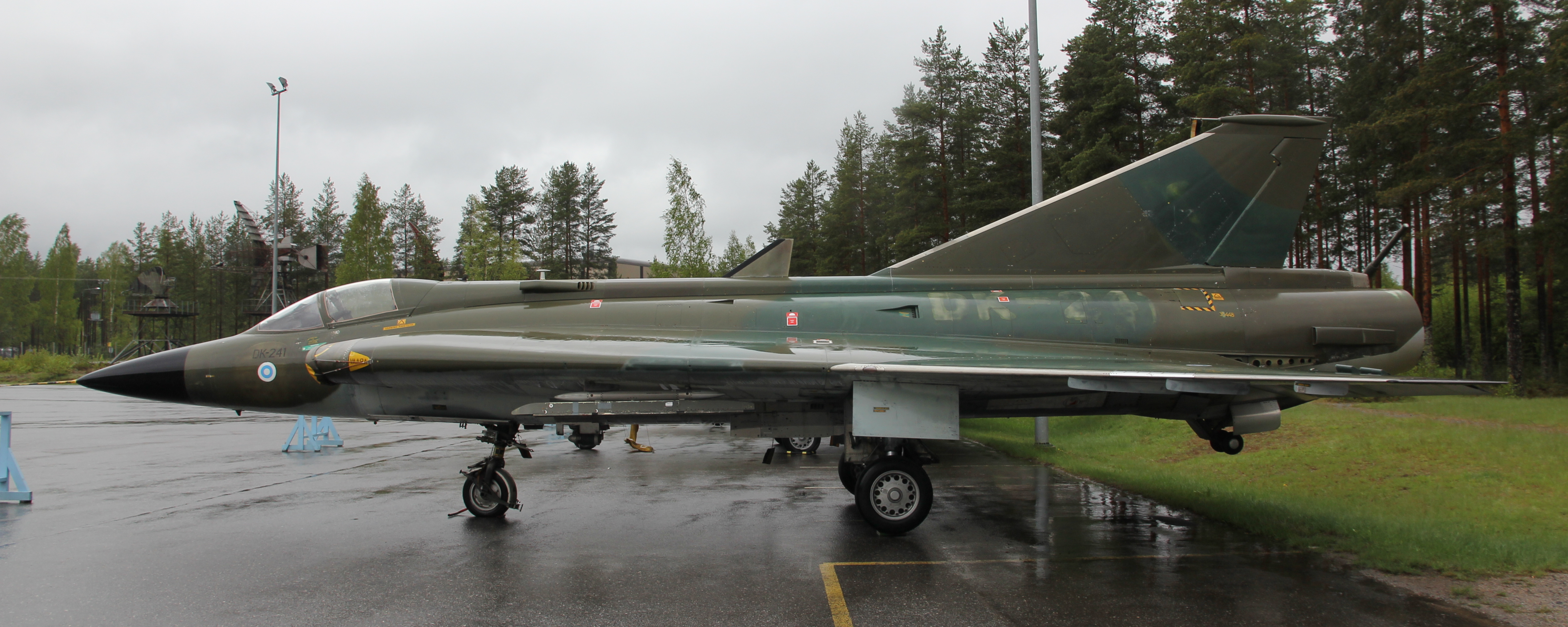
Finnish 35FS (DK-241)

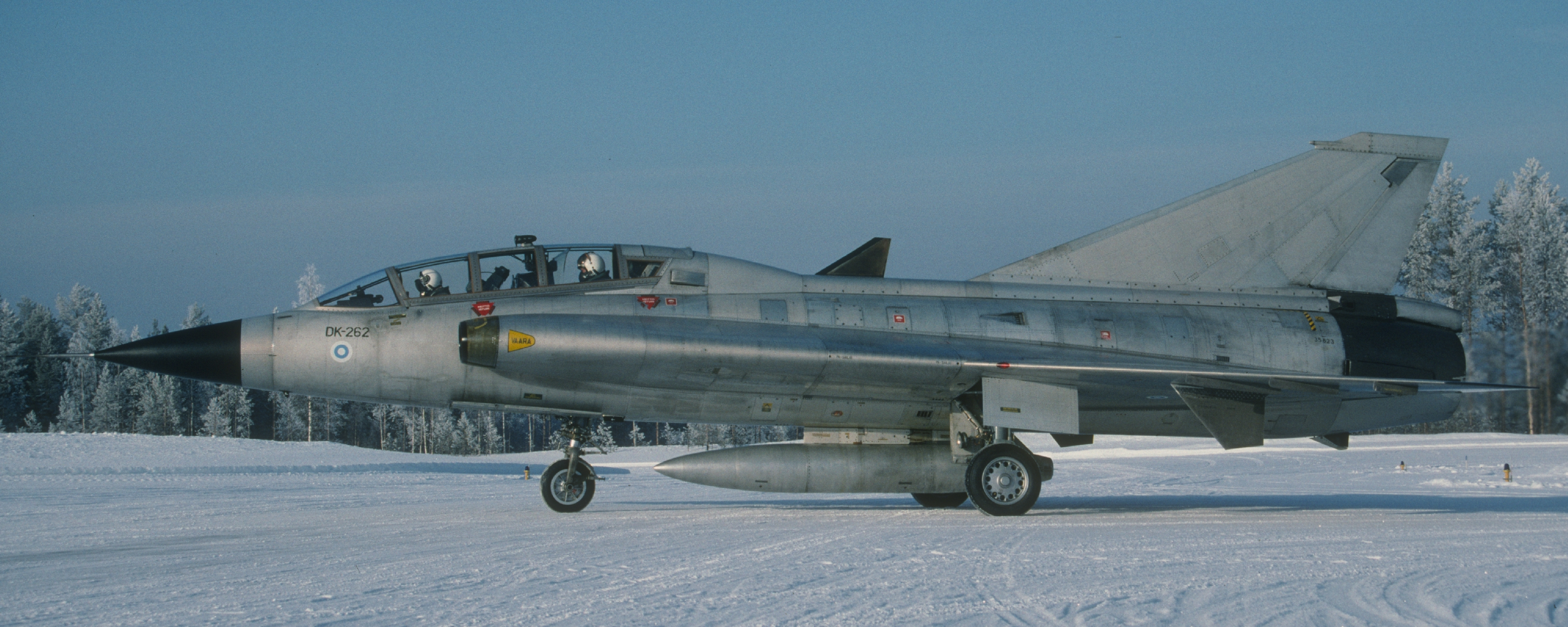
Finnish 35CS (DK-262)

Saab 35XS (Xerxes Sigurd) was an export variant of the Saab 35F interceptor for the Finnish Air Force. X stands for export and S stands for Suomi (Finland in Finnish). The Saab 35XS was sold as part of larger Finnish-Swedish collaboration program to provide the Finnish Air Force with Saab 35 aircraft, starting from 1970. Sweden would provide the Finnish Air Force with second hand J 35F1s, J 35Bs and SK 35Cs, with the Saab 35XS being produced by Saab in Sweden as kits to be assembled under licence by Valmet in Finland. Valmet also received a license to produce spare parts.

The Finnish Air Force gave the Saab 35 the type designation DK (from Draken), although for practical use they reused the Swedish designations, but with the prefixes omitted and with an S added at the end (35BS, 35CS, 35FS), with the exception of the Saab 35XS, which was simply named 35S. On rare occasions the DK designation received a third letter to indicate model (DKS for "35S", etc.). As part of the Saab 35-adoption, Finland also bought Swedish produced Falcon missiles, rb 27 (Hughes HM-55) and rb 28 (Hughes HM-58). These were designated 7S and 8S respectively.

The Finnish Air Force received the following Saab 35 variants:

- DKB / 35BS – ex-Swedish J 35B interceptors sold to Finland. 8 sold and used as advanced trainers, with the exception of one which was used for schooling mechanics. Flew without missiles.
- DKC / 35CS – ex-Swedish SK 35C two-seat trainers sold to Finland. 5 sold and used as trainers.
- DKF / 35FS – ex-Swedish J 35F1 interceptors sold to Finland. 24 sold and used as fighters.
- DKS / 35S – dedicated export version of the Saab 35F for Finland. 12 copies built by Saab and assembled under licence by Valmet in Finland.

The initial delivered second hand Saab 35s entered service with the Finnish Air Force in 1972, with the first Saab 35XS assembled by Valmet – DK-201 – being completed on 12 March 1974. The initial flight trials of the Saab 35XS was flown by Swedish Saab test pilot KG Liljeqvist.

Unique among Saab 35s, the Finnish DKS and DKF were at times outfitted with Soviet R-13M missiles. By the mid-1980s, the DKF and DKS were upgraded with the same extra pylons as the Swedish J 35J. By 1993 the DKS also received countermeasures by installation of two Saab BOY 402 dispensers, capable of launching flares, chaff and expendable active decoys (EAD).

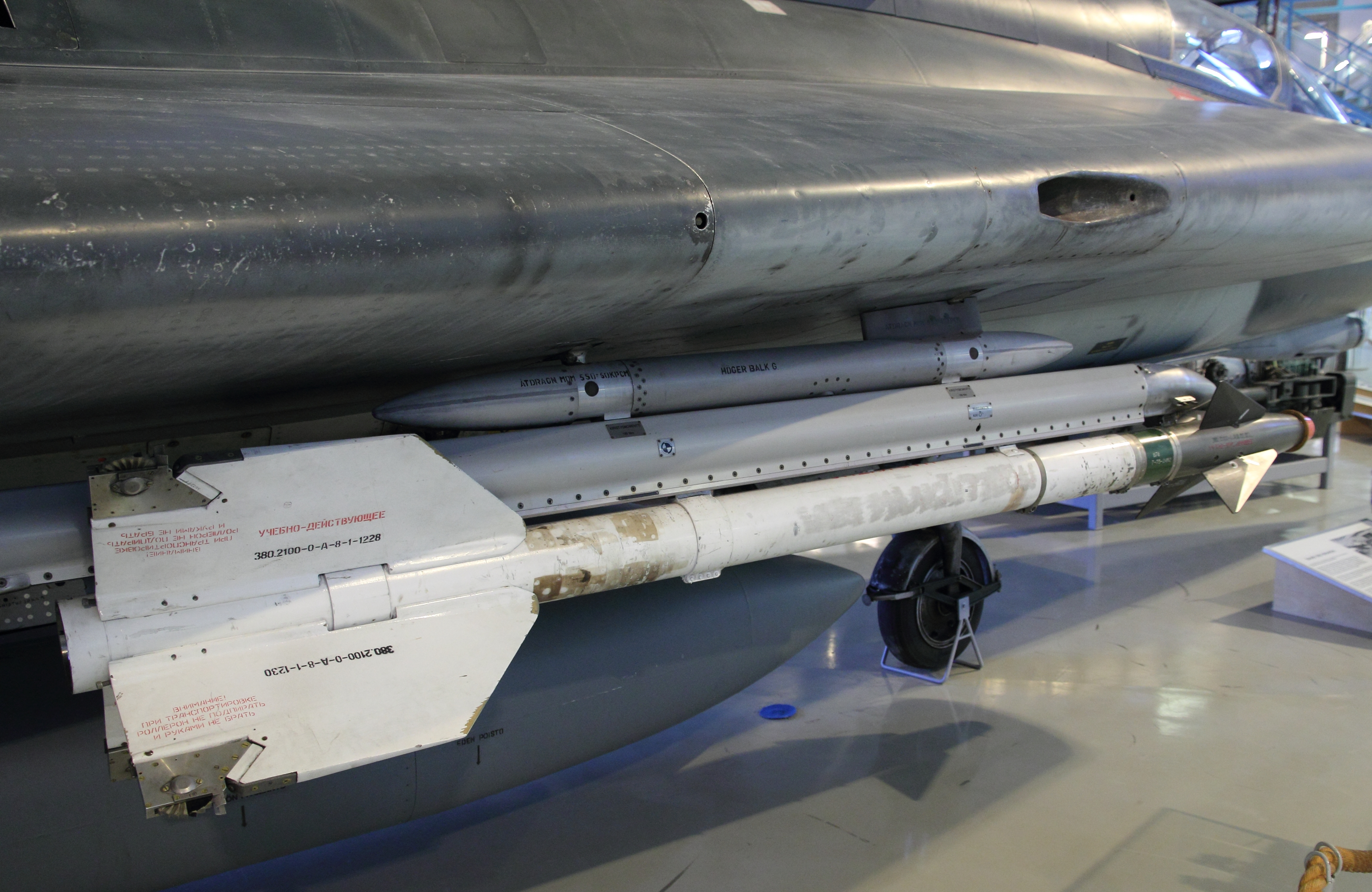
Soviet R-13M on Finnish DKS.

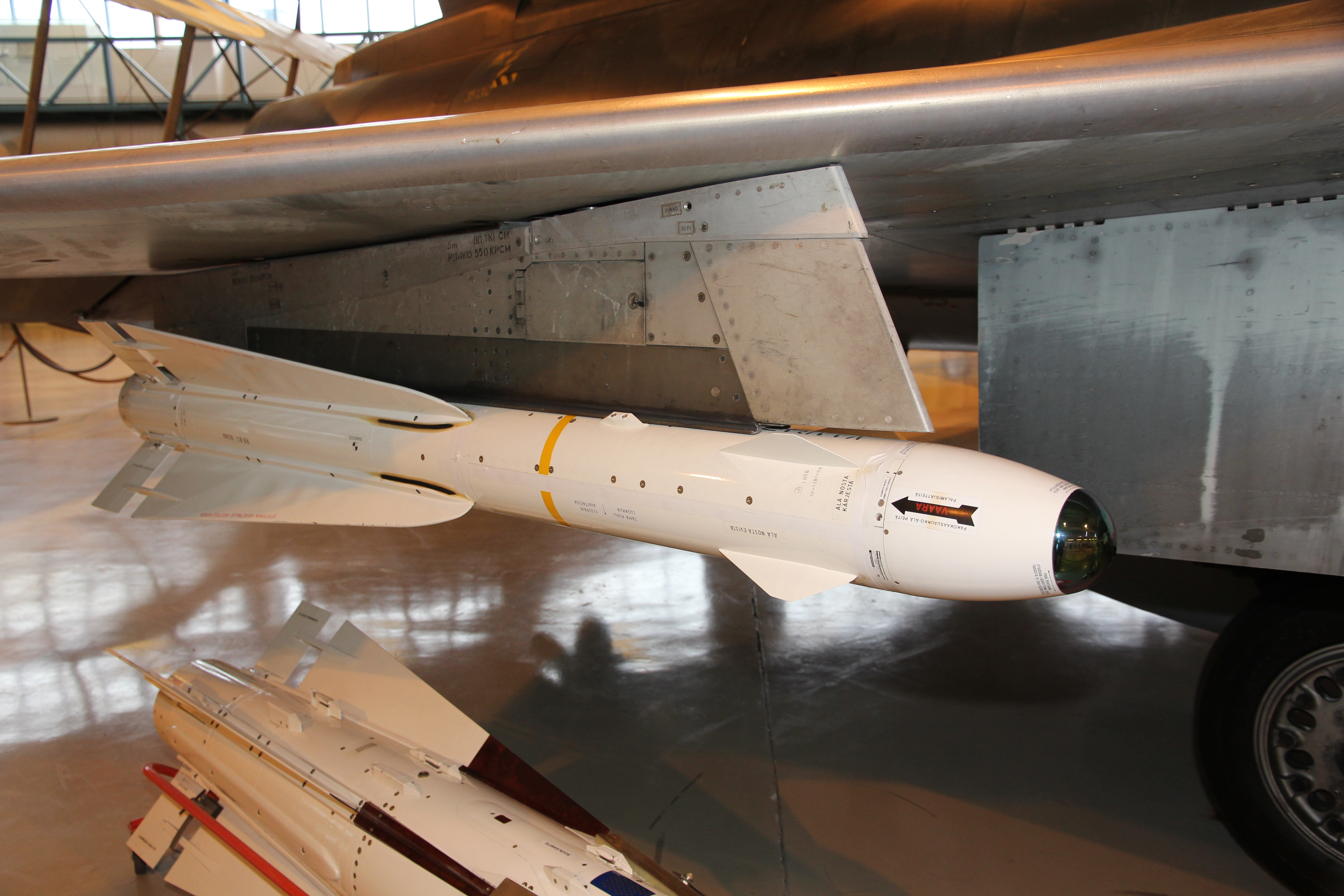
"8S" Falcon missile (HAC HM-58) on Finnish DKS.

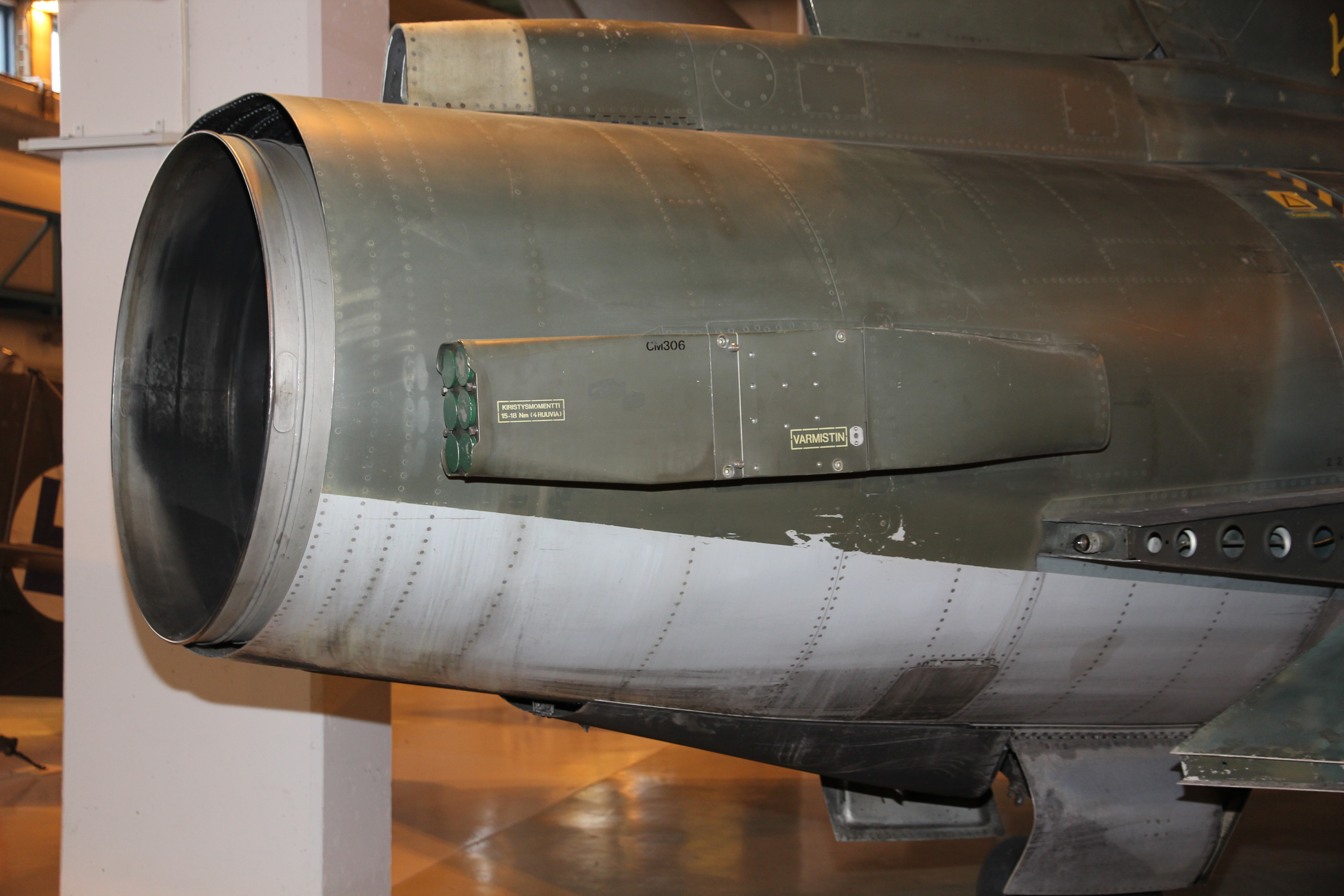
Saab BOY 402 countermeasure dispenser on Finnish DKS.

=== Saab 35XV (Export Venezuela) ===
Saab 35XV (Xerxes Viktor) was an export variant of the J 35D that Saab offered to Venezuela in 1971. X stands for export and V for Venezuela. Venezuela had shown interest for the Saab 35 since 1966 and in 1971 the Draken was test flown by Venezuela against the French Dassault Mirage III and British English Electric Lightning.

On 23 April 1971, the Venezuelan Air Force made an offer for 3 Saab 35 variants:

- Saab 35G1 – single-seat fighter version equal to the Saab 35F; 6 aircraft in the offer
- Saab 35G2 – single-seat attacker version based on the Saab 35XD but without extra internal fuel; 12 aircraft in the offer
- Saab 35GT – two-seat trainer aircraft; 2 aircraft in the offer

A variant of the Saab 105XT, designated Saab 105G, was also included in this offer. 24 Saab 105G proposed. The offer also included a preliminary weapons package with Falcon missiles, bombs, rockets and cannon ammunition, as well as 'Product Support' and extra equipment such as weapons pylons and drop tanks.

Due to budget cuts the Venezuelan offer later changed to only include 15 Saab 35s and 15 Saab 105s but in the end the entire project fell apart due to US pressure and intervention.

=== Saab 35Ö (Österreich) ===
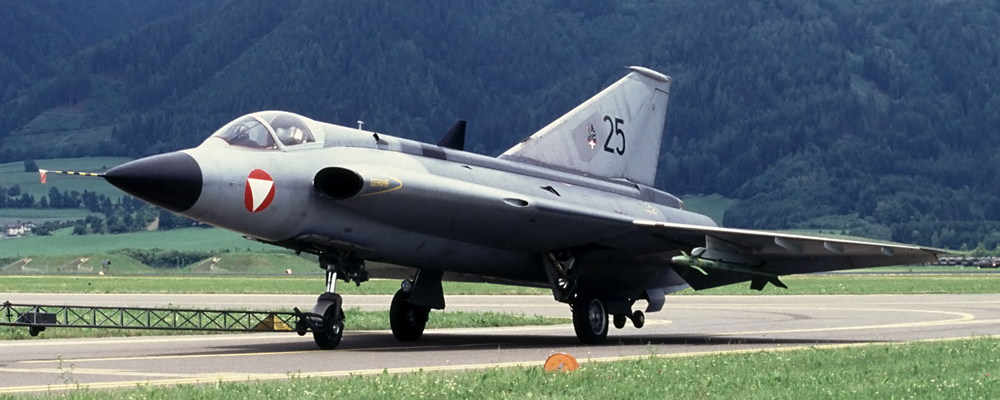
J 35Ö Mk.I

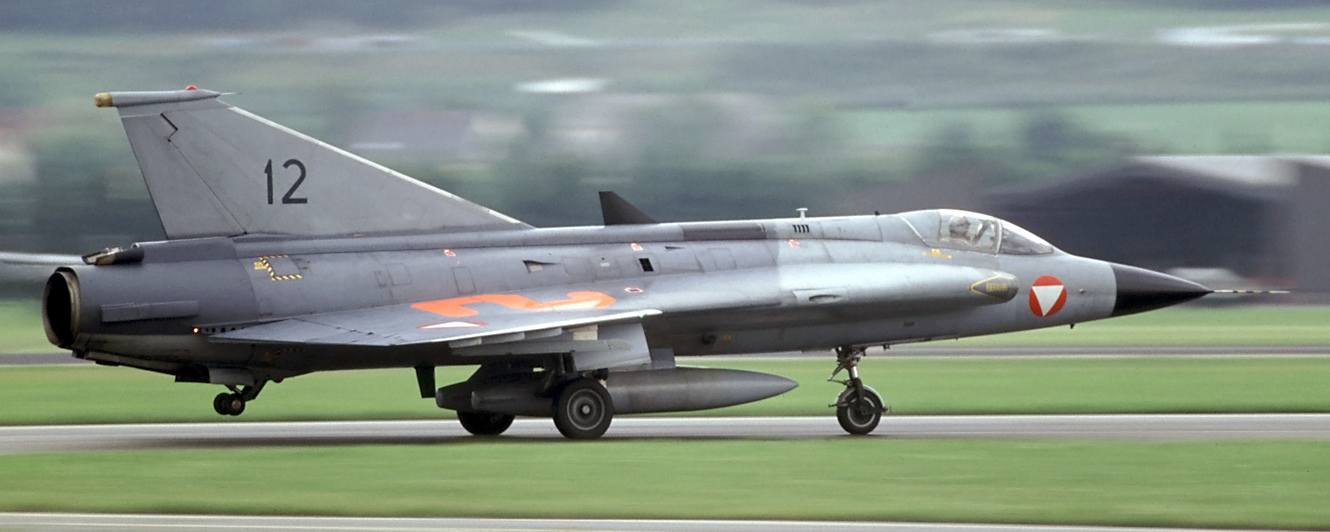
J 35Ö Mk.II

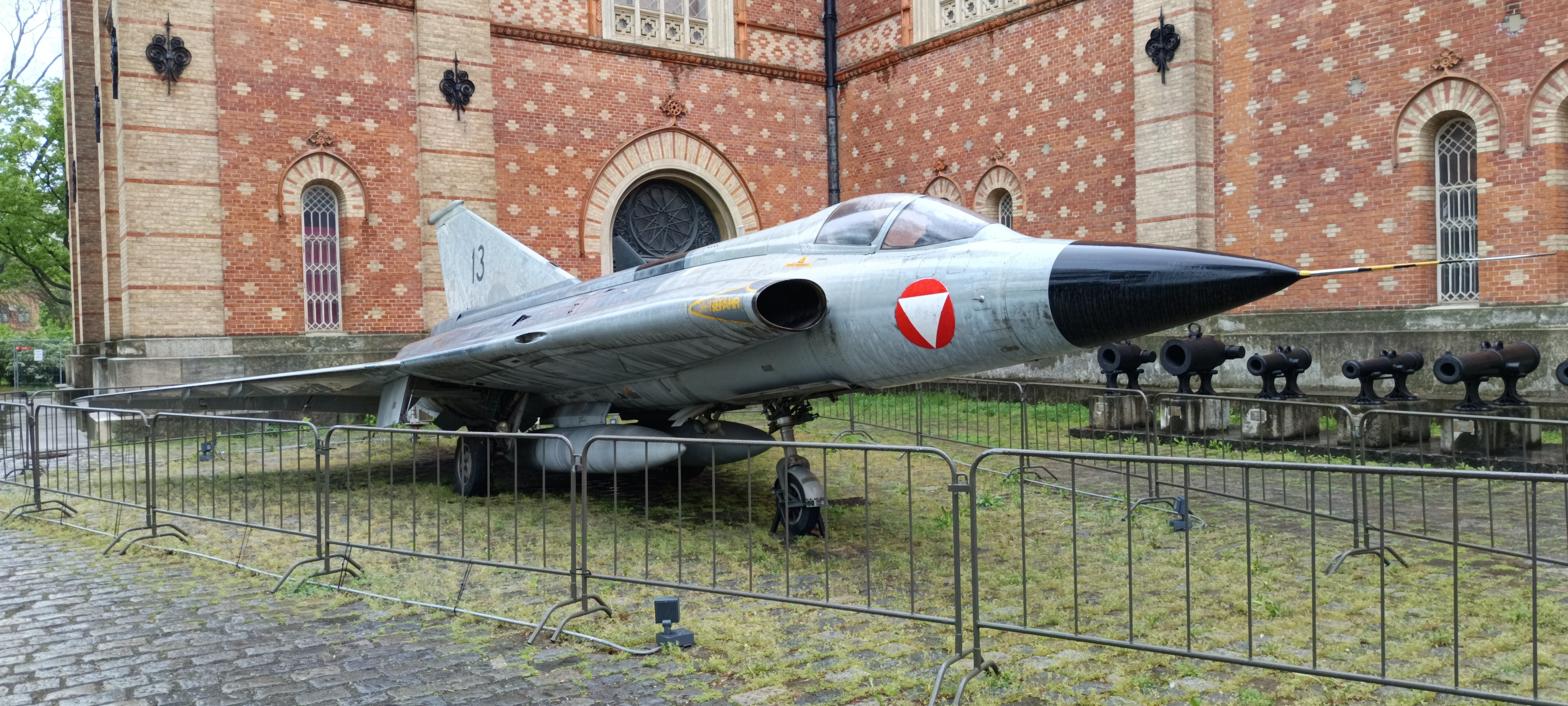
J 35Ö at the Museum of Military History, Vienna

Saab 35Ö (Östen) or Saab 35OE (international name) was an export version of the Saab 35D for the Austrian Air Force. The Ö-suffix stands for Austria (Swedish: Österrike, German: Österreich). Since the Austrian Air Force lacks a proper designation system the Saab 35Ö got the name J 35Ö in Austria. The J prefix is a remnant of the Saab J 29F that Austria operated during the 1960s. The Austrians called their Saab 105Ö as J 105Ö for example. Saab re-purchased 24 J 35D aircraft from the Swedish Air Force in the mid-1980s and converted them into the Saab 35Ö version for export to Austria.

The Saab 35Ö was more or less equal to the Saab 35D but featured the updated bird-proof cockpit from the Saab 35F. Austria was offered the Saab 35F as an option but as Austria was forbidden to use guided missiles after World War II there was no point in choosing the F model with one cannon over the D model with two cannons. It quickly became apparent however that the Austrian Drakens needed missiles to protect their airspace and after the fall of the USSR and outbreak of the Yugoslav Wars Austria was permitted to use missiles. This was followed by Austria adopting several types of the AIM-9 Sidewinder, such as the AIM-9P-3.

In 1992 the Austrian Drakens received an upgrade giving them a radar warning receiver (RWR), chaff and flare countermeasures and the AIM-9P-5 all aspect missile. The RWR and countermeasure system was developed in collaboration with the Royal Danish Air Materiel Command FMK (Flyvematerielkommandoen) and looked very similar to the systems used on the Danish WDNS Drakens. The upgrade was performed by Valmet in Finland. This version is commonly called "J 35Ö mark 2" under a variety of spellings: J 35Ö Draken MK2, J-35 Oe Draken Mk.II.

== Technology tree ==
Saab 35 Draken technology tree

Saab A 35XD	Saab S 35XD	Saab SK 35XD
Saab 35J	Saab 35XS	Saab 35FD	Saab 35XD	Saab 35G2	Saab 35G1	Saab 35GT
Saab 35Ö	Saab 35FS	Saab 35F	Saab 35E	Saab 35G
Saab 35H	Saab 35D	Saab 35X	Saab 35XV
Saab 35CS	Saab 35C	Saab 35B	Saab 35BS
Saab 35A1	Saab 35A2
Saab 35 prototypes
Fpl 210A	Fpl 210B

== Data ==
Primary source: Widfeldt (1995).

	J 35A1	J 35A2	J 35B	SK 35C	J 35D	S 35E	J 35F	J 35J
Cockpit seats	One			Two	One			
Length	15.207 m (49.89 ft)	15.34 m (50.33 ft)		15.207 m (49.89 ft)	15.34 m (50.33 ft)			
Wingspan	9.42 m (30.9 ft)							
Wing area	49.22 m^{2} (529.8 sq ft)							
Tail height	3.869 m (12.69 ft)				3.89 m (12.76 ft)			
Radar type	PS-02/A		PS-03/A	–	PS-03/A	–	PS-011/A	
Weapons sight	6B		7A	–	7A	–	7B	
Empty weight	6,590 kg (14,500 lb)			6,792 kg (15,000 lb)	7,265 kg (16,000 lb)	7,311 kg (16,100 lb)	7,425 kg (16,400 lb)	7,422 kg (16,400 lb)
MTOW	10,089 kg (22,200 lb)	10,189 kg (22,500 lb)	10,508 kg (23,200 lb)	10,089 kg (22,200 lb)	11,864 kg (26,200 lb)	11,973 kg (26,400 lb)	11,914 kg (26,300 lb)	12,430 kg (27,400 lb)
Maximum speed	1,900 km/h (1,200 mph)				2,150 km/h (1,340 mph)		Mach 2.0	
Runway length requirement (dry)	810 m (2,660 ft)				920 m (3,020 ft)	921 m (3,022 ft)	1,220 m (4,000 ft)	
-"- (drag chute)	510 m (1,670 ft)				680 m (2,230 ft)	678 m (2,224 ft)	880 m (2,890 ft)	
Internal fuel	2,240 L (590 US gal)				2,820 L (740 US gal)			
Drop tanks 525 L (139 US gal)	1				2	4	2	4
Internal cannons 30 mm Aden	2			–	2	–	1	
Air-to-air missiles Sidewinder	4			–	4	–	4 Falcon-capable	6 Falcon-capable
Air-to-air rockets 75 mm	–		2×19	–	2×19	–	2×19	4×19
Engine	RM6B				RM6C			
Afterburner	Ebk 65	Ebk 66		Ebk 65	Ebk 67			

== Operators ==
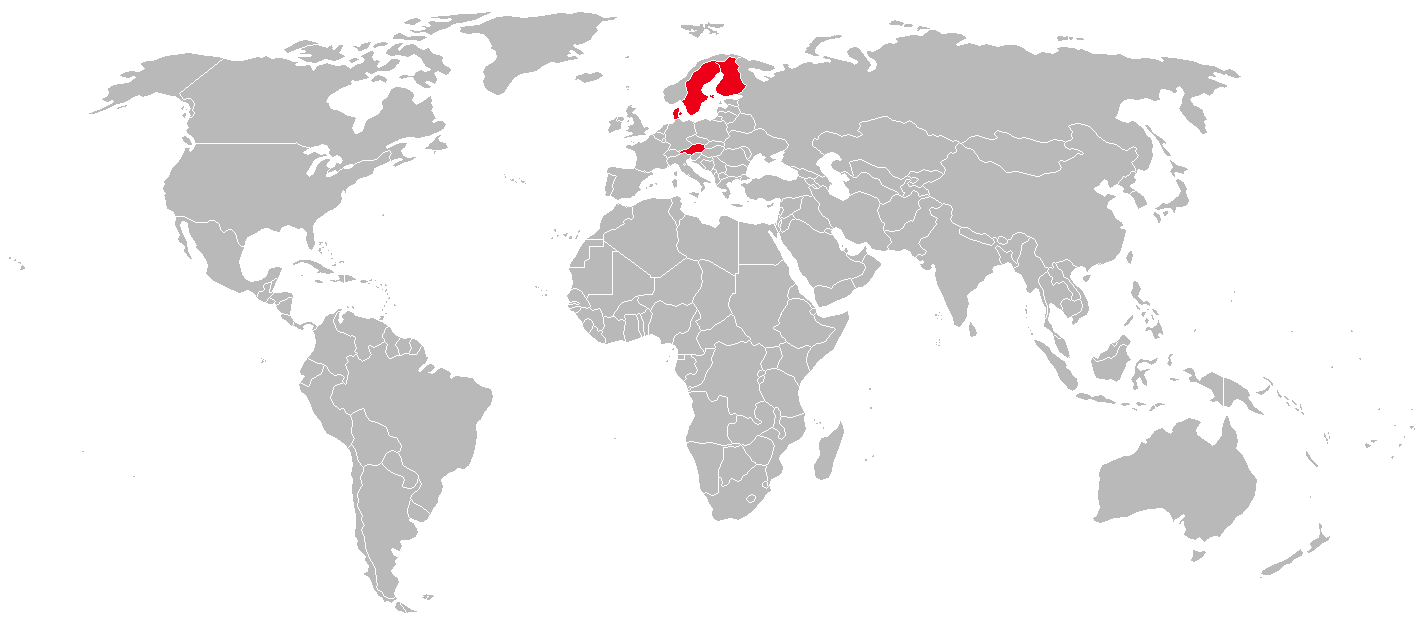
former Saab 35 Draken Operators in red

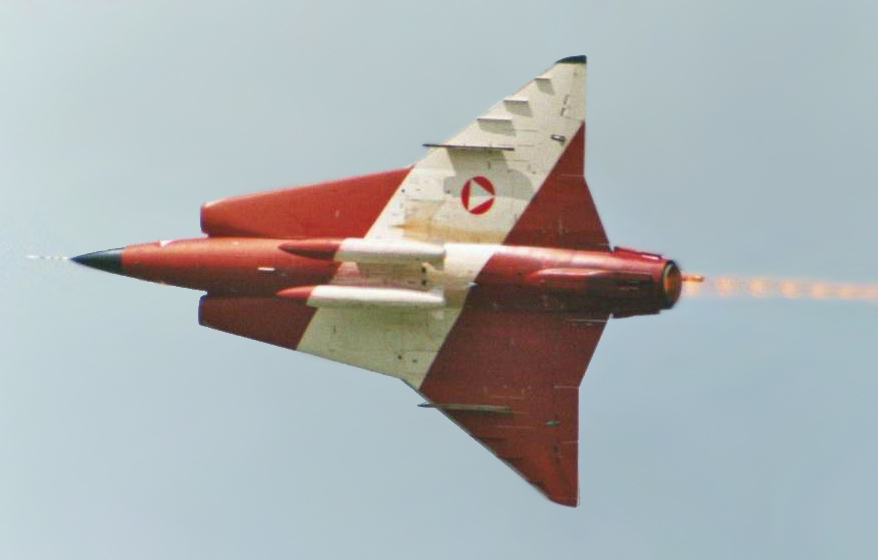
Austrian Air Force Draken

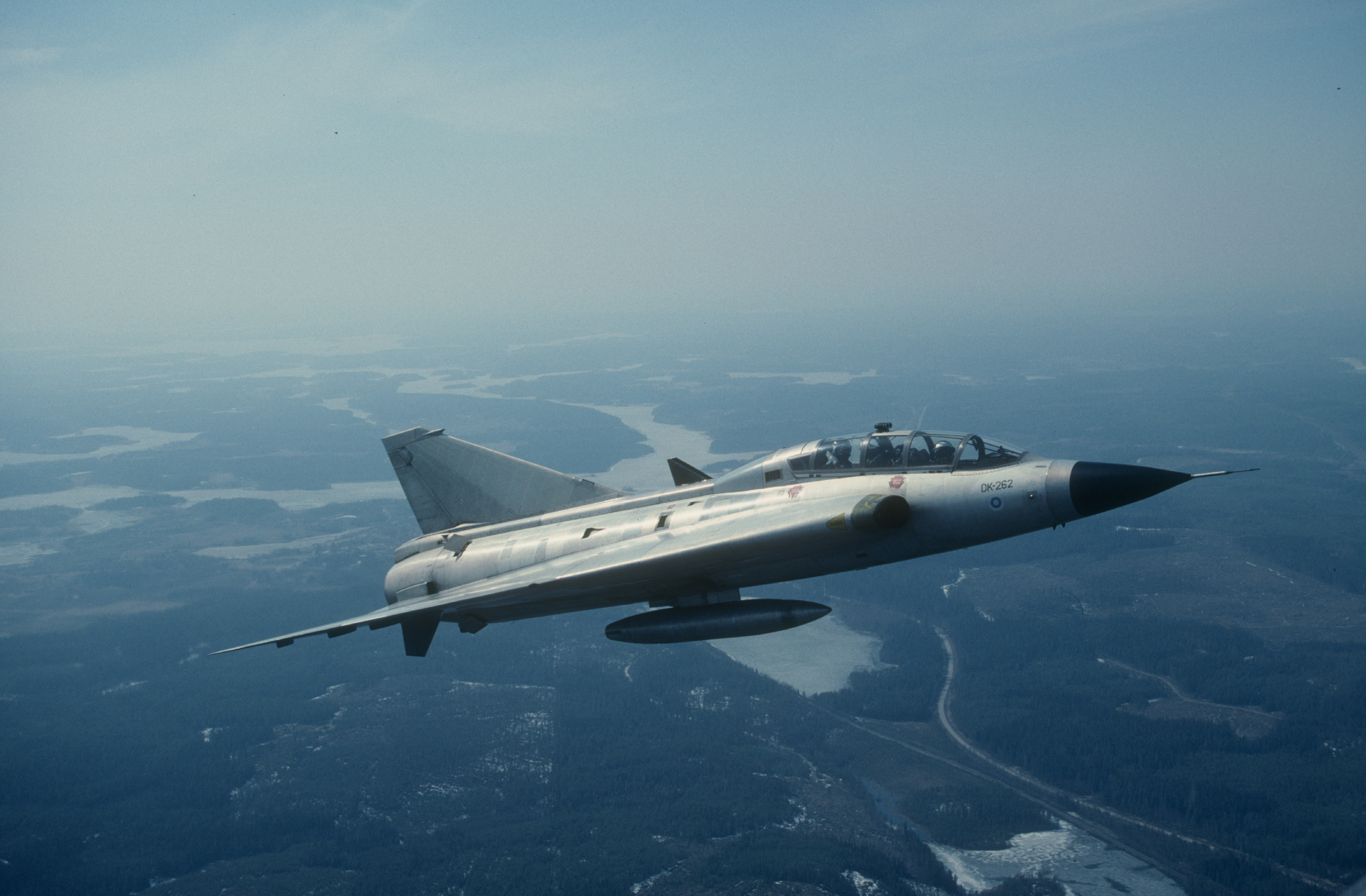
Finnish Air Force Trainer Draken

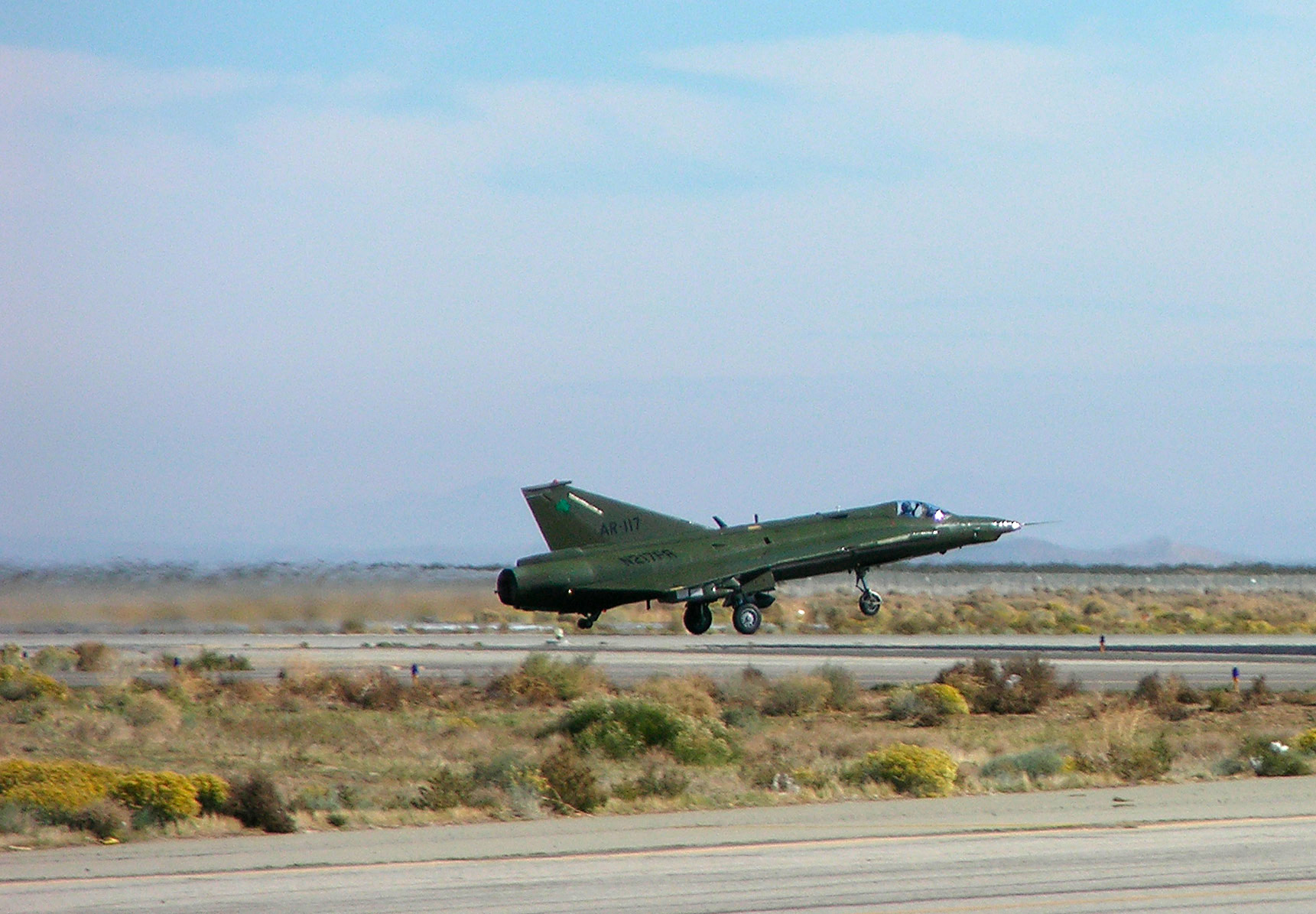
Ex-RDAF RF-35XD N217FR operated by the National Test Pilot School takes off from the Mojave Spaceport.

The Saab 35 Draken was withdrawn from military use in 2005. Several aircraft fly in civilian service, mainly by the National Test Pilot School.

Austria

- Austrian Air Force, 24 aircraft:
  - Fliegerregiment 2
    - Staffel 1
    - Staffel 2

Denmark

- Royal Danish Air Force, 51 aircraft:
  - No. 725 Squadron
  - No. 729 Squadron

Finland

- Finnish Air Force, 50 aircraft:
  - Fighter Squadron 11
  - Fighter Squadron 21

Sweden

- Swedish Air Force

	J 35A	J 35B	SK 35C	J 35D	S 35E	J 35F	J 35J
F 1 Hässlö	–	–	–	–	–	1966–1983	–
F 3 Malmslätt	–	–	–	1965–1970	–	1970–1973	–
F 4 Frösön	–	–	–	1969–1984	–	–	–
F 10 Ängelholm	–	1966–1976	1986–1999	1964–1971	–	1969–1991	1987–1999
F 11 Nyköping	–	–	–	–	1965–1979	–	–
F 12 Kalmar	–	–	–	–	–	1968–1979	–
F 13 Norrköping	1960–1964	–	–	1963–1966	–	1965–1978	–
F 16 Uppsala	1961–1976	1962–1965	1962–1985	–	–	1976–1985	–
F 17 Kallinge	–	–	–	–	–	1972–1982	–
F 18 Tullinge	–	1962–1973	–	–	–	–	–
F 21 Kallax	–	–	–	1969–1984	1966–1979	–	–

United States

- National Test Pilot School (6)

== Surviving aircraft ==
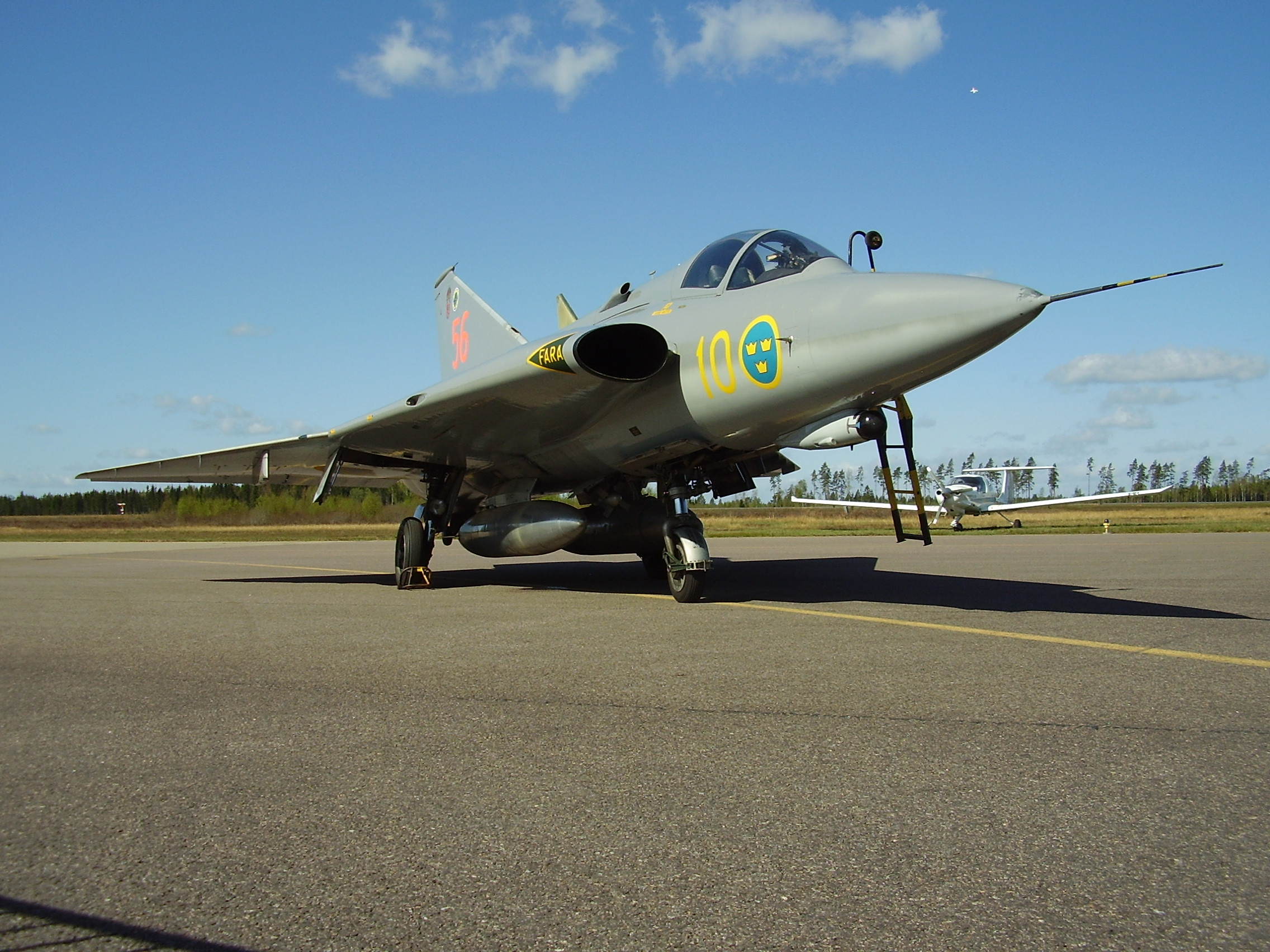
Saab Draken at Växjö Air Show 2012

A small number of Drakens are still with civilian owners mainly in the United States, many former-operational aircraft have been preserved in the operating nations.

== Specifications (J 35F Draken) ==
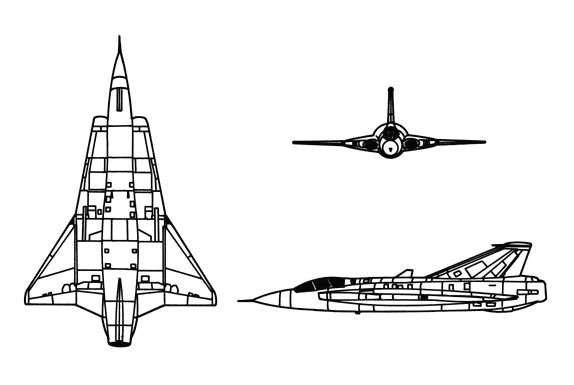
Saab J 35 Draken 3-view drawing

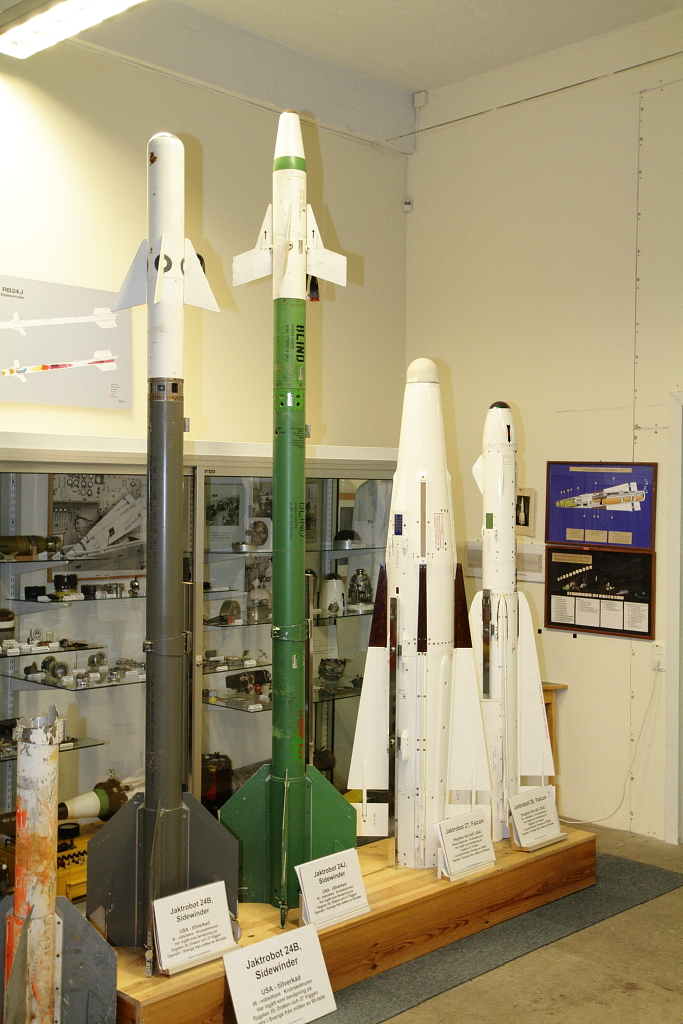
Missiles used on the J 35F and J 35J (from left to right): Robot 24B; Robot 24J; Robot 27; Robot 28 / rb 24B rb 24J rb 27 rb 28 / Ford AIM-9B; Ford AIM-9J; HAC HM-55; HAC HM-58

Data from The Great Book of Fighters, Combat Aircraft since 1945, Saab 35 Draken in Finnish Air Force, SAAB Aircraft since 1937

General characteristics

- Crew: 1
- Length: 15.35 m (50 ft 4 in)
- Wingspan: 9.42 m (30 ft 11 in)
- Height: 3.89 m (12 ft 9 in)
- Wing area: 49.2 m^{2} (530 sq ft)
- Airfoil: 5%
- Empty weight: 7,865 kg (17,339 lb)
- Gross weight: 11,000 kg (24,251 lb)
- Max takeoff weight: 11,914 kg (26,266 lb)
- Powerplant: 1 × Svenska Flygmotor RM6C afterburning turbojet engine, 56.5 kN (12,700 lbf) thrust dry, 78.4 kN (17,600 lbf) with afterburner

Performance

- Maximum speed: 2,450 km/h (1,520 mph, 1,320 kn) at 11,000 m (36,000 ft)
- Maximum speed: Mach 2.3
- Ferry range: 2,750 km (1,710 mi, 1,480 nmi) with external drop tanks
- Service ceiling: 20,000 m (66,000 ft)
- Rate of climb: 199 m/s (39,200 ft/min)
- Wing loading: 231.6 kg/m^{2} (47.4 lb/sq ft)
- Thrust/weight: 0.7
- Takeoff roll: 800 m (2,600 ft)

Armament

- Guns: 1× or 2× 30 mm akan m/55 ADEN cannon with 100 rounds per gun (in Saab 35F one cannon was omitted (with 120 rounds) to fit avionics needed for Falcon missile integration, earlier variants and export variants retained twin guns.)
- Hardpoints: six for ordnance, or drop tanks on the bottom two hardpoints, with a capacity of 2,900 kg (6,393 lb), with provisions to carry combinations of:
  - Rockets: 2× 75 mm air-to-ground rocket pods ventrally or 12× 135 mm rockets on six underwing pylons
  - Missiles: rb 24, rb 27 and rb 28 air-to-air missiles
  - Bombs: The Danish export version, (F-35), was modified according to NATO standards and was fitted with 1,000lb bomb hardpoints

== See also ==
- General Dynamics F-16XL

Related development

- Saab 210

Aircraft of comparable role, configuration, and era

- Avro Canada CF-105 Arrow – (Canada)
- Convair F-102 Delta Dagger – (United States)
- Convair F-106 Delta Dart – (United States)
- Dassault Mirage III – (France)
- English Electric Lightning – (United Kingdom)
- Lockheed F-104 Starfighter – (United States)
- Mikoyan-Gurevich MiG-21 – (Soviet Union)

Related lists

- List of fighter aircraft
- List of military aircraft of Sweden
