= Lorwin =

Lorwin is a surname. Notable people with the surname include:

- Lewis L. Lorwin (1884–1970), Russian-American historian and planner
- Rose Strunsky Lorwin (1884–1963), Russian-American translator and socialist
- Val R. Lorwin (c. 1907–1982), American civil servant, economist, and historian

== See also ==
- Lorin
- Łowin (disambiguation)
