= Lippisch P.13 =

German aircraft design

P.13

General information
- Type: Bomber
- National origin: Germany
- Manufacturer: Messerschmitt
- Designer: Josef Hubert
- Number built: 0

The Lippisch P.13 was a 1942 design for a high-speed bomber aircraft by Josef Hubert. Of highly unconventional configuration, it was a tail-less, swept-wing design with an engine and propeller mounted at both the front and rear of the aircraft. A large ventral fin gave it an almost cruciform cross-section.

At the time of the P.13's design, Hubert was working in Dr Alexander Lippisch's department at Messerschmitt; when Lippisch left the firm in April 1943, the department was dissolved and its designs (including the P.13) were abandoned.

The similarly named Lippisch P.13a and P.13b were completely unrelated projects, undertaken after Lippisch's relocation to Vienna.

== Specifications (P.13, as designed) ==
Data from

General characteristics

- Crew: 1
- Length: 9.4 m (30 ft 10 in)
- Wingspan: 12.8 m (42 ft 0 in)
- Height: 5.1 m (16 ft 9 in)
- Airfoil: Airfoil was similar to NACA-0015-64.

Performance Armament

- Bombs: 1 bomb

== See also ==
Related development

- Lippisch DM-1 Glider version for Lippisch L-13, seized by US troops, studied at Langley NACA Wind Tunnel

Aircraft of comparable role, configuration, and era

- Dornier Do 335
- Handley Page HP.115

Related lists

- List of military aircraft of Germany
- List of World War II military aircraft of Germany
