= DM-1 =

DM-1 may refer to:

- Crew Dragon Demo-1, the first—uncrewed—demonstration flight of Crew Dragon
- Lippisch DM-1, a delta-wing glider, built in Germany during WW2
- USS Stribling (DD-96), a United States Destroyer later converted into a minelayer, DM-1
