= Convair XF-92 =

Experimental interceptor aircraft

XF-92A
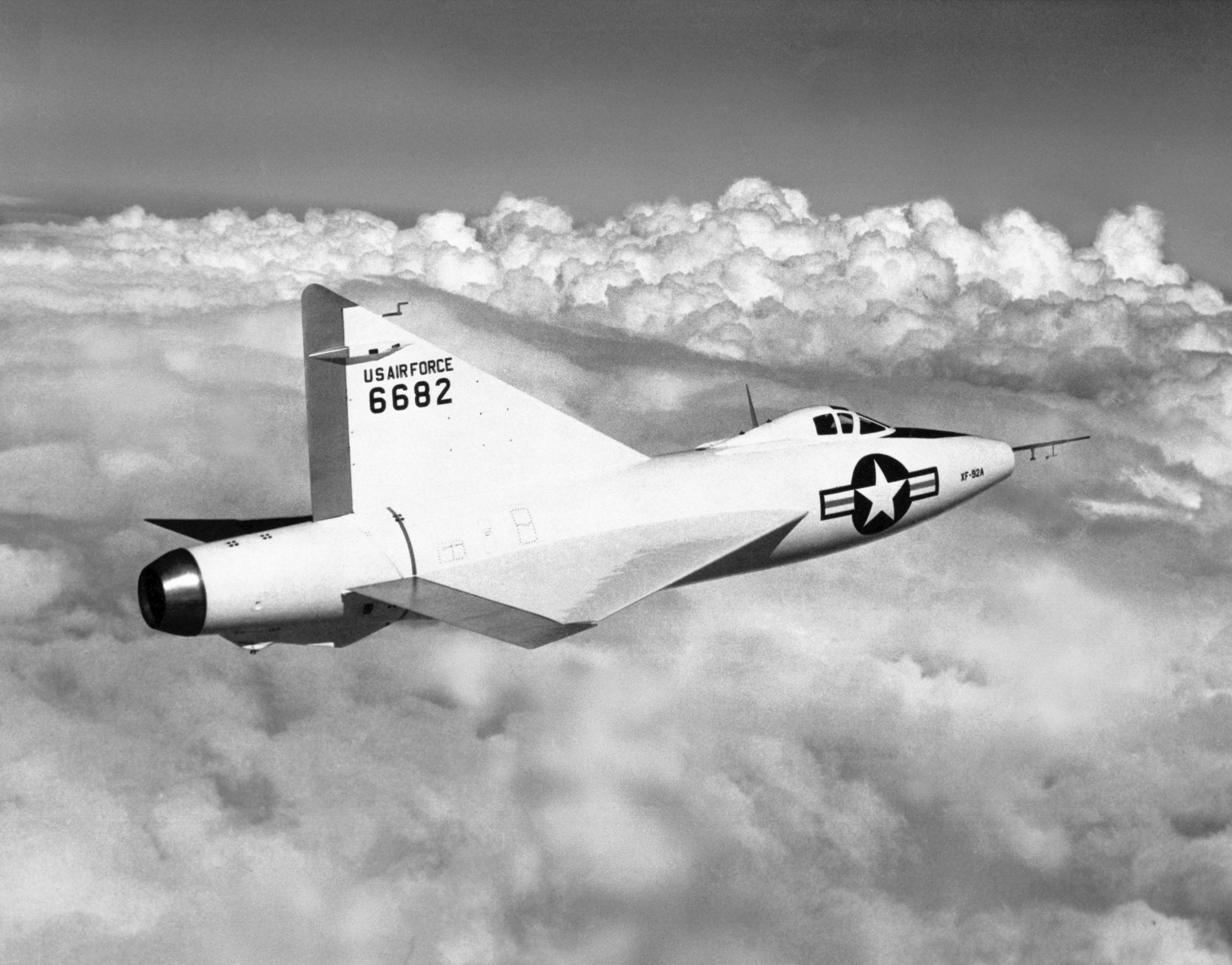
- A photo of the Convair XF-92A in flight

General information
- Type: Point-defense interceptor; Experimental aircraft
- Manufacturer: Convair
- Status: Canceled
- Primary user: United States Air Force
- Number built: 1

History
- First flight: 18 September 1948
- Developed into: Convair F-102 Delta Dagger

The Convair XF-92 (re-designated from XP-92 in 1948) is an American delta wing first-generation jet prototype. Originally conceived as a point-defence interceptor, the design was later used purely for experimental purposes and only one was built. However, it led Convair to use the delta-wing on a number of designs, including the F-102 Delta Dagger, F-106 Delta Dart, B-58 Hustler, the US Navy's F2Y Sea Dart as well as the VTOL FY Pogo.

== Design and development ==
=== Early work ===
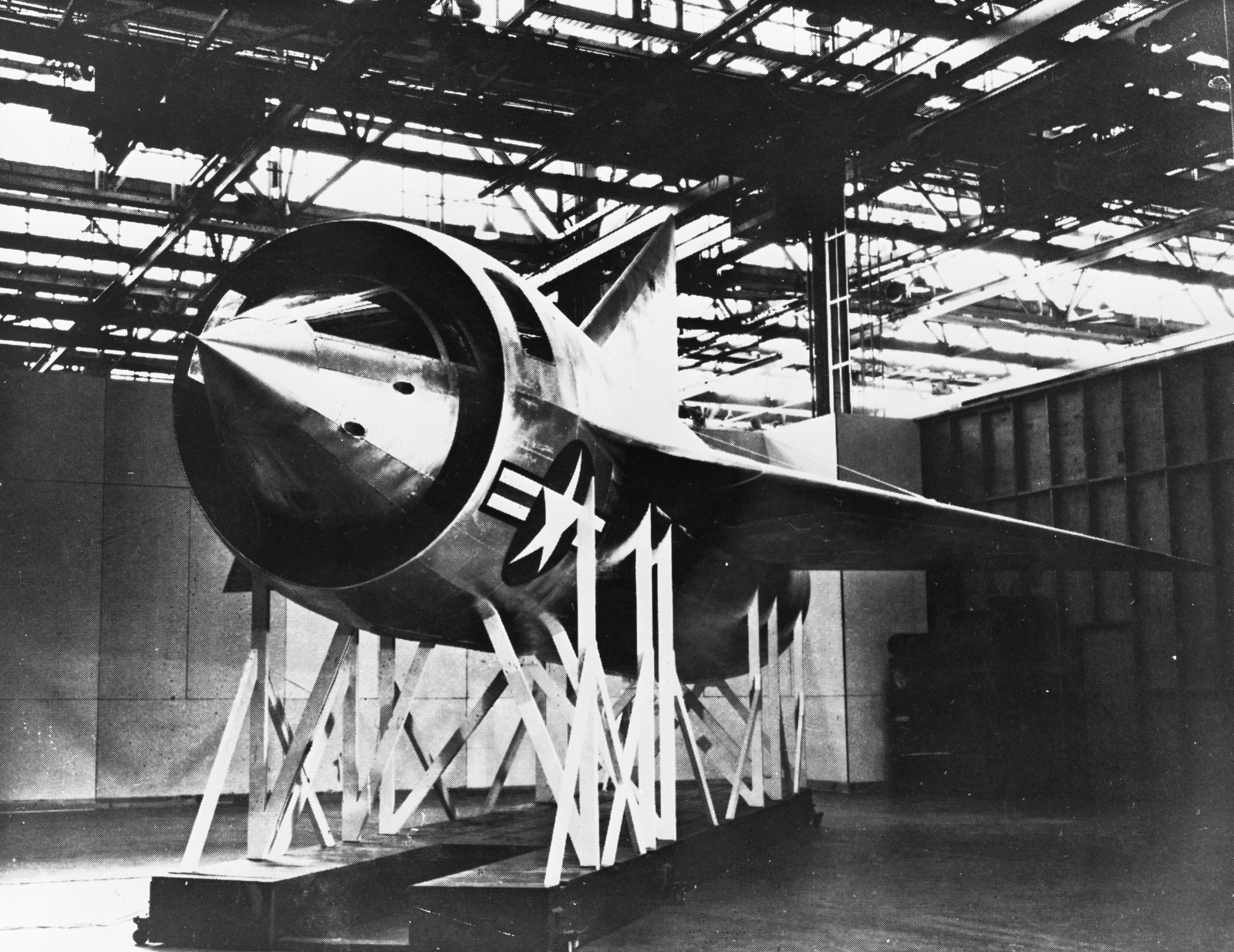
Mockup of the XP-92.

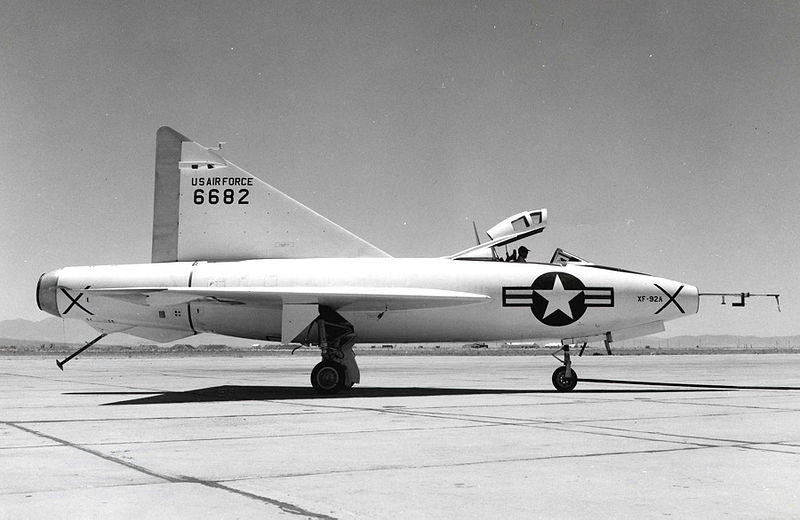
The XF-92A at Edwards Air Force Base, 1952

Prior to August 1945, the Vultee Division of Consolidated-Vultee looked at the possibility of a swept-wing aircraft powered by a ducted rocket. Years earlier, the company had performed designs which involved liquid-cooled radiator engines. With this design, fuel would be added to the heat produced by small rocket engines in the duct, creating a "pseudo-ramjet".

In August 1945, the United States Army Air Forces (USAAF), soon to be renamed the United States Air Force, issued a proposal for a supersonic interceptor capable of 700 mph (1,100 km/h) speeds and reaching an altitude of 50,000 feet (15,000 m) in four minutes. Several companies responded, among which was Consolidated-Vultee, which submitted its design on 13 October 1945. This design featured swept wings and V-tails, as well as a powerful propulsion system. Besides the ducted rocket, four 1,200 pounds-force (5.3 kN) rockets were positioned at the exhaust nozzle, along with the 1,560 pounds-force (6.9 kN) 19XB turbojet produced by Westinghouse.

A proposal by Consolidated Vultee (later Convair) was accepted in May 1946, with a proposal for a ramjet-powered aircraft, with a 45° swept wing under USAAF Air Materiel Command Secret Project MX-813. However, wind tunnel testing demonstrated a number of problems with this design.

=== Switch to delta ===
Convair found that by straightening the trailing edge and increasing the sweep of the leading edge, the characteristics of their new wing were greatly improved. Thus, contrary to suggestions that German designer Alexander Lippisch influenced it, Convair independently discovered the thin high-speed delta wing. Ralph Shick, chief of aerodynamic research, later met Lippisch at Wright-Patterson Air Force Base. This helped to convince him that the thin delta was the way forward, however the influence of Lippisch provided no more than "moral support" and Convair rejected many of his ideas, such as the thick wing of the Lippisch P.13a project and the DM-1 test glider which the US had tested.

Thrust was to be provided by a 1,560 lbf (6,900 N) Westinghouse J30 jet engine assisted by a battery of six 2,000 lbf (8.9 kN) liquid-fueled rockets. This mixed-propulsion system required a very large intake duct, which not only fed the jet engine but also passed air around the rocket exhaust to provide thrust augmentation. Located centrally, the large duct left nowhere to put a traditional cockpit; in its normal location it would have projected deep into the duct. To address this, the team modified the design in a fashion similar to both the Leduc 0.10 and Miles M.52, placing the cockpit in a cylindrical body in the center of the intake. The design was presented to the U.S. Air Force in 1946 and was accepted for development as the XP-92.

=== Delta research ===
In order to gain inflight experience with the delta wing layout, Convair suggested building a smaller prototype, the Model 7002, which the USAAF accepted in November 1946.

In order to save development time and money, many components were taken from other aircraft; the main gear was taken from a North American FJ-1 Fury, the nosewheel from a Bell P-63 Kingcobra, the engine and hydraulics were taken from a Lockheed P-80 Shooting Star, the ejection seat and cockpit canopy were taken from the cancelled Convair XP-81, and the rudder pedals were taken from a BT-13 trainer.

Construction was well underway at Vultee Field in Downey, California when North American Aviation took over the Vultee plants in summer 1947. The airframe was moved to Convair's plant in San Diego, and completed in the autumn. In December it was shipped without an engine to NACA's Ames Aeronautical Laboratory for wind tunnel testing. After testing was completed, the airframe was returned to San Diego, where it was fitted with a 4,250 lbf (18,900 N) Allison J33-A-21 engine.

By the time the aircraft was ready for testing, the concept of the point-defense interceptor seemed outdated and the (now redesignated) F-92 project was cancelled; the test aircraft was nevertheless completed as the XF-92A.

== Operational history ==
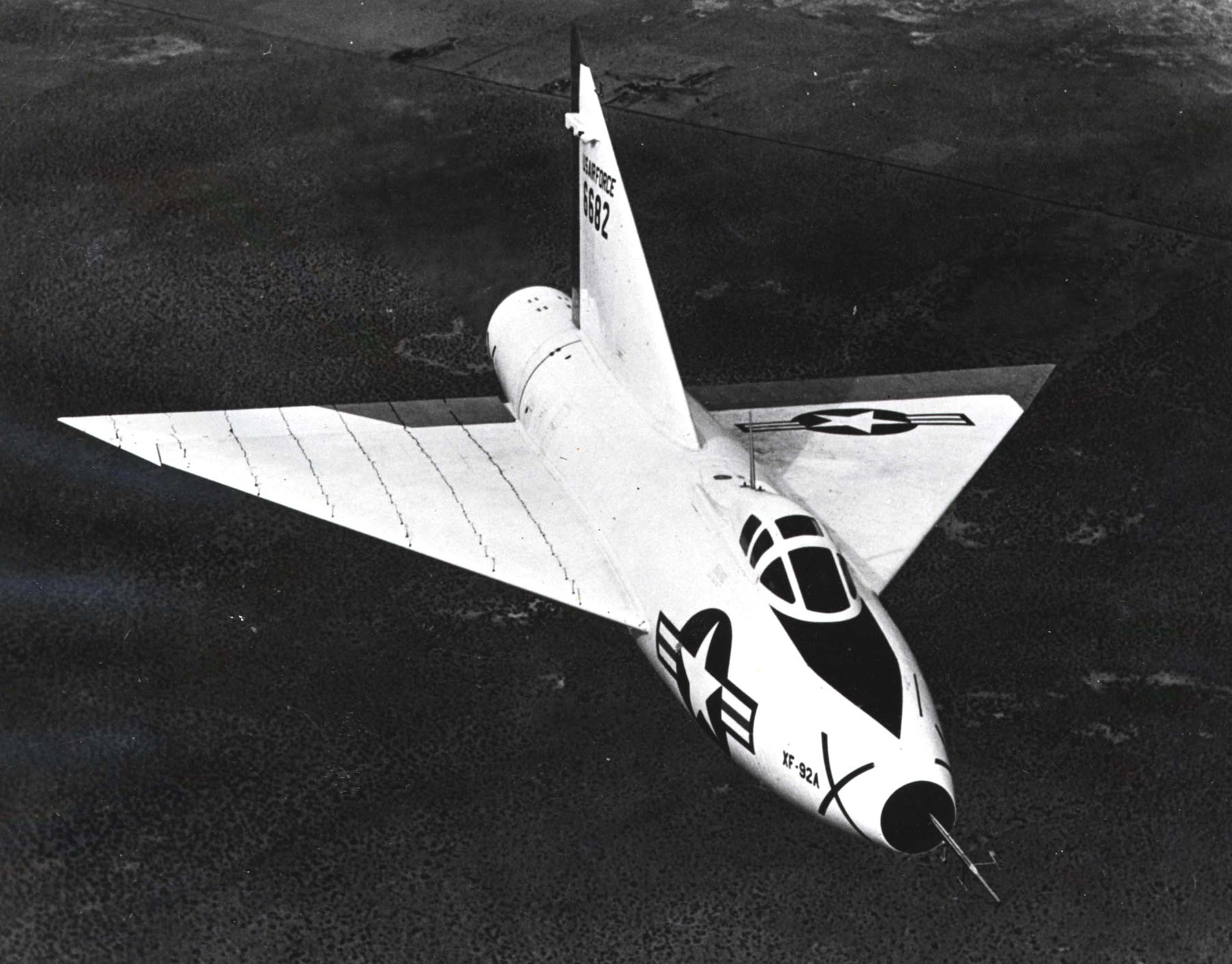
Convair XF-92A in flight with bare metal scheme

In April 1948 the XF-92A was shipped to Muroc Dry Lake (later to become Edwards AFB). Early tests were limited to taxiing, although a short hop was made on 9 June 1948. The XF-92A's first flight was on 18 September 1948 with Convair test pilot Ellis D. "Sam" Shannon at the controls. On 21 December 1948 Bill Martin began testing the aircraft for the company. After 47 flights totaling 20 hours and 33 minutes, the aircraft was turned over to the USAAF on 26 August 1949, with the testing being assigned to Frank Everest and Chuck Yeager.

On 13 October 1949 Yeager became the first Air Force pilot to fly the XF-92A. On his second flight he dove the aircraft in a 4 g split-S dive, reaching Mach 1.05 for a brief time. When approaching for landing on this flight he continued to pull the nose higher and higher in order to slow the forward speed to avoid the problems from his first attempt. Surprisingly, the aircraft simply wouldn't stall; he was able to continue raising the nose until he reached 45 degrees pitch, flying under control in that attitude to a landing at 67 mph (108 km/h), 100 mph (160 km/h) slower than Convair had managed.

In 1951, the XF-92A was refitted with an Allison J33-A-29 engine with an afterburner, offering a thrust of 7,500 lbf (33,000 N). The re-engined XF-92A was flown by Yeager for the first time on 20 July 1951. However, there was very little improvement in performance. In addition, there were maintenance problems with this engine and only 21 flights were made during the next 19 months. A final engine change was made to the 5,400 lbf (24,000 N) J33-A-16.

On 9 April 1953, Scott Crossfield began a series of flights on behalf of NACA. These tests revealed a violent pitch-up tendency during high-speed turns, often as much as 6 g, and on one occasion 8 g. The addition of wing fences partially alleviated this problem. Crossfield flew 25 flights in the XF-92A by 14 October 1953. After the aircraft's last flight the nose gear collapsed as Crossfield taxied off the lake bed; the aircraft was retired.

None of the pilots had much good to say about the design. Yeager commented "It was a tricky plane to fly, but ... I got it out to 1.05 Mach." Crossfield was more direct, saying "Nobody wanted to fly the XF-92. There was no lineup of pilots for that airplane. It was a miserable flying beast. Everyone complained it was underpowered."

=== Influence ===
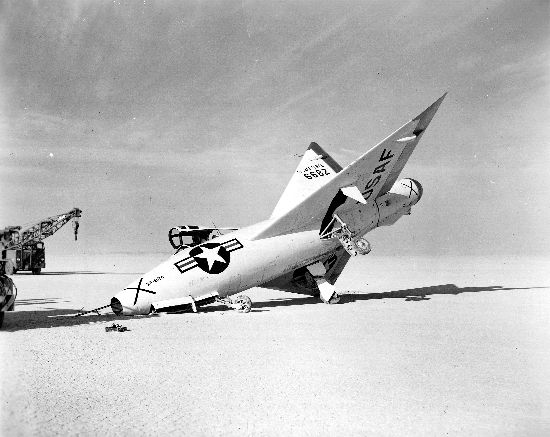
Landing accident, 1953

The delta wing's thin airfoil cross section, low weight and structural strength made it a good candidate for a supersonic airplane. The large surface area of 425 ft^{2} (39 m^{2}) gave a low wing loading which in turn led to good low-speed performance. Very slow landing speeds could be achieved, at the cost of extremely nose-high landing angles and the resulting poor visibility. The combination of good high-speed and low-speed characteristics was very difficult to achieve for other planforms. Although the XF-92 itself was not liked, the design concept clearly had promise and the delta wing was used on several Convair designs through the 1950s and 1960s.

Of particular interest to aircraft designers was the unexpectedly good low-speed behavior Yeager had noticed on his second flight. The aircraft continued to remain controllable at very high angles of attack (alpha), where a conventional layout would have stalled. The reason for this turned out to be the unexpected creation of a large vortex over the top of the wing, generated by the airflow between the fuselage and leading edge of the wing at high alpha. The vortex became "attached" to the upper surface of the wing, supplying it with air moving at speeds much greater than the aircraft's forward speed. By controlling the flow in this critical area, the performance envelope of the delta could be greatly expanded, which led to the introduction of canards on most delta-wing designs in the 1960s and 1970s. More recently leading edge extensions have become common on most fighter aircraft, creating the vortex over a more conventional wing planform.

== Operators ==
United States

- United States Air Force

== Aircraft on display ==
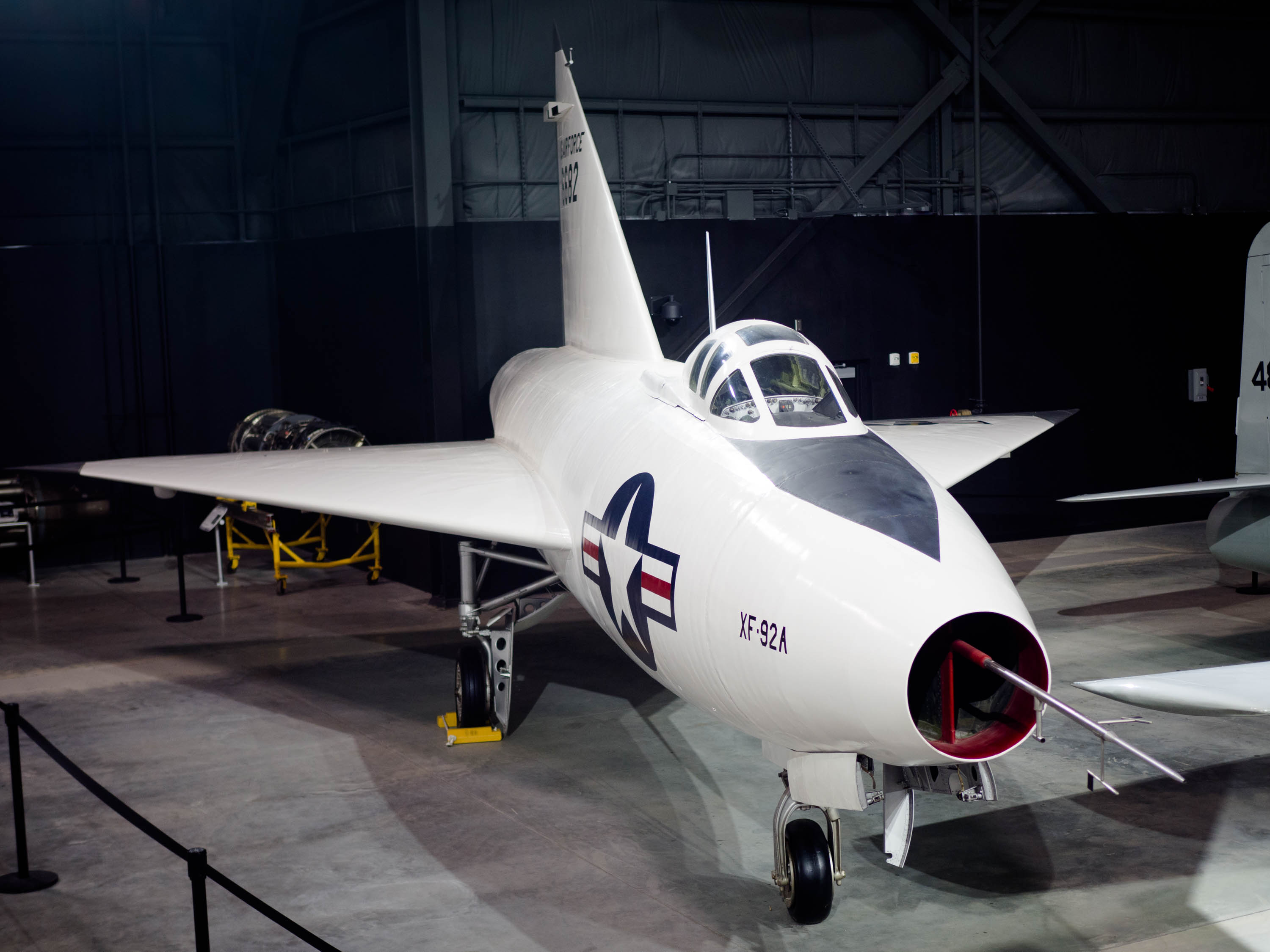
XF-92A at the NMUSAF on August 31, 2017.

- 46-682 – Research & Development Gallery at the National Museum of the United States Air Force, Wright-Patterson Air Force Base, near Dayton, Ohio.

== Specifications (XF-92A) ==
Orthographically projected diagram of the XF-92A.

Data from Fighters of the United States Air Force

General characteristics

- Crew: 1
- Length: 42 ft 6 in (12.95 m)
- Wingspan: 31 ft 4 in (9.55 m)
- Height: 17 ft 9 in (5.41 m)
- Wing area: 425 sq ft (39.5 m^{2})
- Airfoil: NACA 65-006.5
- Empty weight: 9,078 lb (4,118 kg)
- Gross weight: 14,608 lb (6,626 kg)
- Powerplant: 1 × Allison J33-A-29 afterburning turbojet engine, 4,500 lbf (20 kN) thrust dry, 7,500 lbf (33 kN) with afterburner

Performance

- Maximum speed: 718 mph (1,156 km/h, 624 kn)
- Service ceiling: 50,750 ft (15,470 m)
- Rate of climb: 8,135 ft/min (41.33 m/s)
- Wing loading: 34 lb/sq ft (170 kg/m^{2})
- Thrust/weight: 0.51

== Popular culture ==
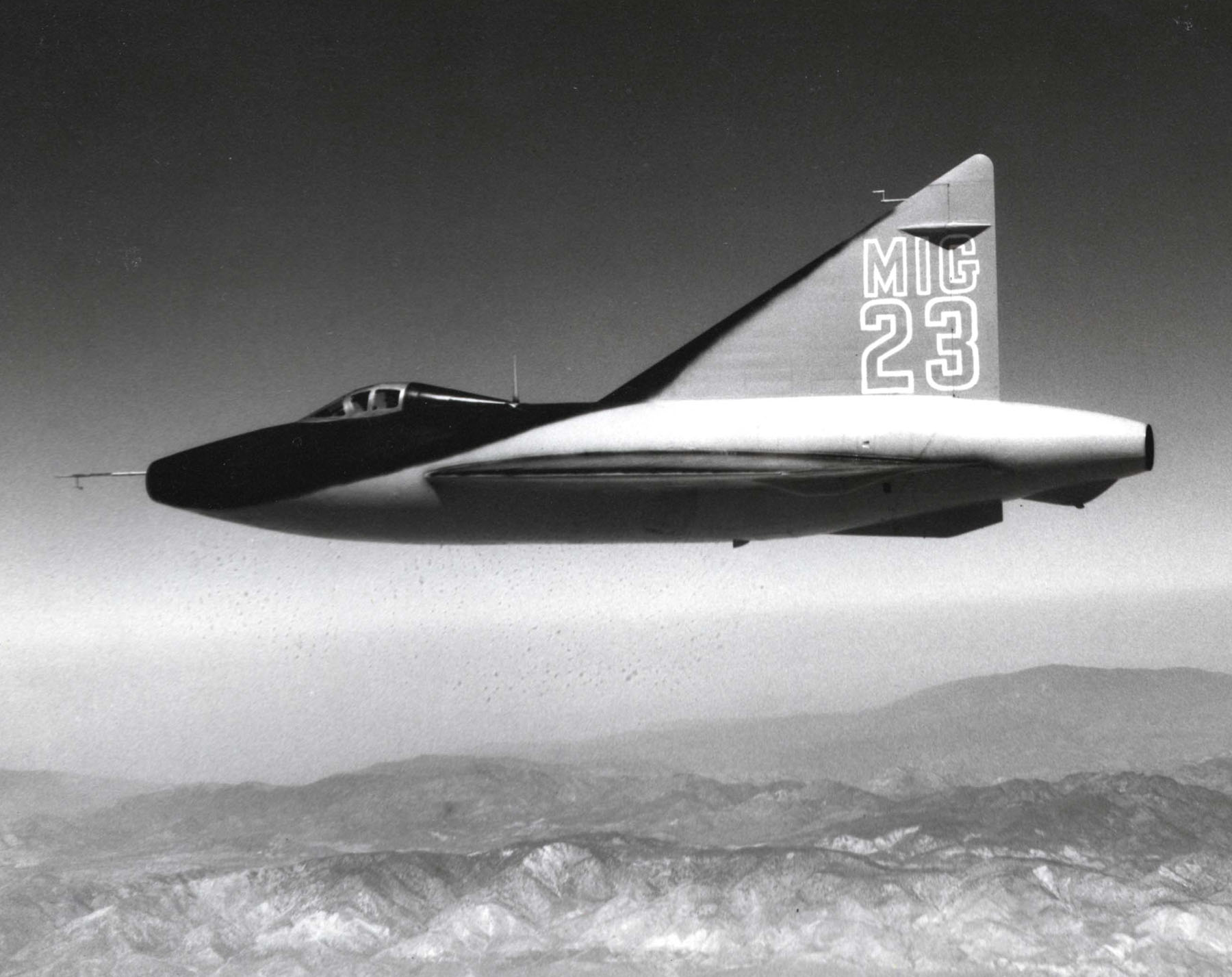
Convair XF-92A painted as a fictional MiG-23 for the movie Jet Pilot

An unusual application of the XF-92A was as a movie model, stepping into the role of the "MiG-23" in the Howard Hughes film, Jet Pilot, starring John Wayne and Janet Leigh. Due to the lengthy delay in releasing the film, by the time it appeared in 1957, the XF-92A's role had been left on the cutting room floor. It did appear in the film Toward the Unknown (1956) starring William Holden, again in the guise of another aircraft, this time as its descendant design the F-102 Delta Dagger.

== See also ==
- Lippisch P.13a
- Lippisch DM-1

Related development

- Convair F-102 Delta Dagger
- Convair F-106 Delta Dart

Aircraft of comparable role, configuration, and era

- Boulton Paul P.111
- Leduc 0.10
- Nord 1500 Griffon

Related lists

- List of experimental aircraft
- List of fighter aircraft

== Bibliography ==
- Bradley, Robert E. Convair Advanced Designs II, Crecy Publishing, 2013.
- Dorr, Robert F. and David Donald. Fighters of the United States Air Force. London: Temple, 1990. ISBN 0-600-55094-X.
- Hallion, Richard P. "Convair's Delta Alpha". Air Enthusiast Quarterly, No. 2, n.d., pp. 177–185. ISSN 0143-5450
- Hallion, Richard P. "Lippisch, Gluhareff, and Jones: The Emergence of the Delta Planform and Origins of the Sweptwing in the United States", Aerospace Historian, Vol.26, No.1, Spring/March 1979. pp. 1–10. (JSTOR copy).
- Jenkins, Dennis R. and Tony R. Landis. Experimental & Prototype U.S. Air Force Jet Fighters. North Branch, Minnesota, USA: Specialty Press, 2008. ISBN 978-1-58007-111-6.
- Knaack, Marcelle Size. Encyclopedia of US Air Force Aircraft and Missile Systems: Volume 1 Post-World War II Fighters 1945–1973. Washington, DC: Office of Air Force History, 1978. ISBN 0-912799-59-5.
- Pace, Steve. X-Fighters: USAF Experimental and Prototype Jet Fighters, XP-59 to YF-23. St. Paul, Minnesota: Motorbooks International, 1991. ISBN 0-87938-540-5.
- Taylor, John W. R. & Michael J. H. Jane's Pocket Book of Research and Experimental Aircraft. Collier Books: New York, 1977 ISBN 0-356-08405-1.
- Watson, Heidi. "Daddy of the Deltas." The Friends Journal, U.S. Air Force Museum, Winter 1997/1998.
- Winchester, Jim. X-Planes and Prototypes. London: Amber Books Ltd., 2005. ISBN 1-904687-40-7.
- Yenne, Bill. Convair Deltas from SeaDart to Hustler. Specialty Press: North Branch, MN, 2009. ISBN 978-1-58007-118-5.
