= Lippisch P.13a =

German ramjet interceptor project

P.13a
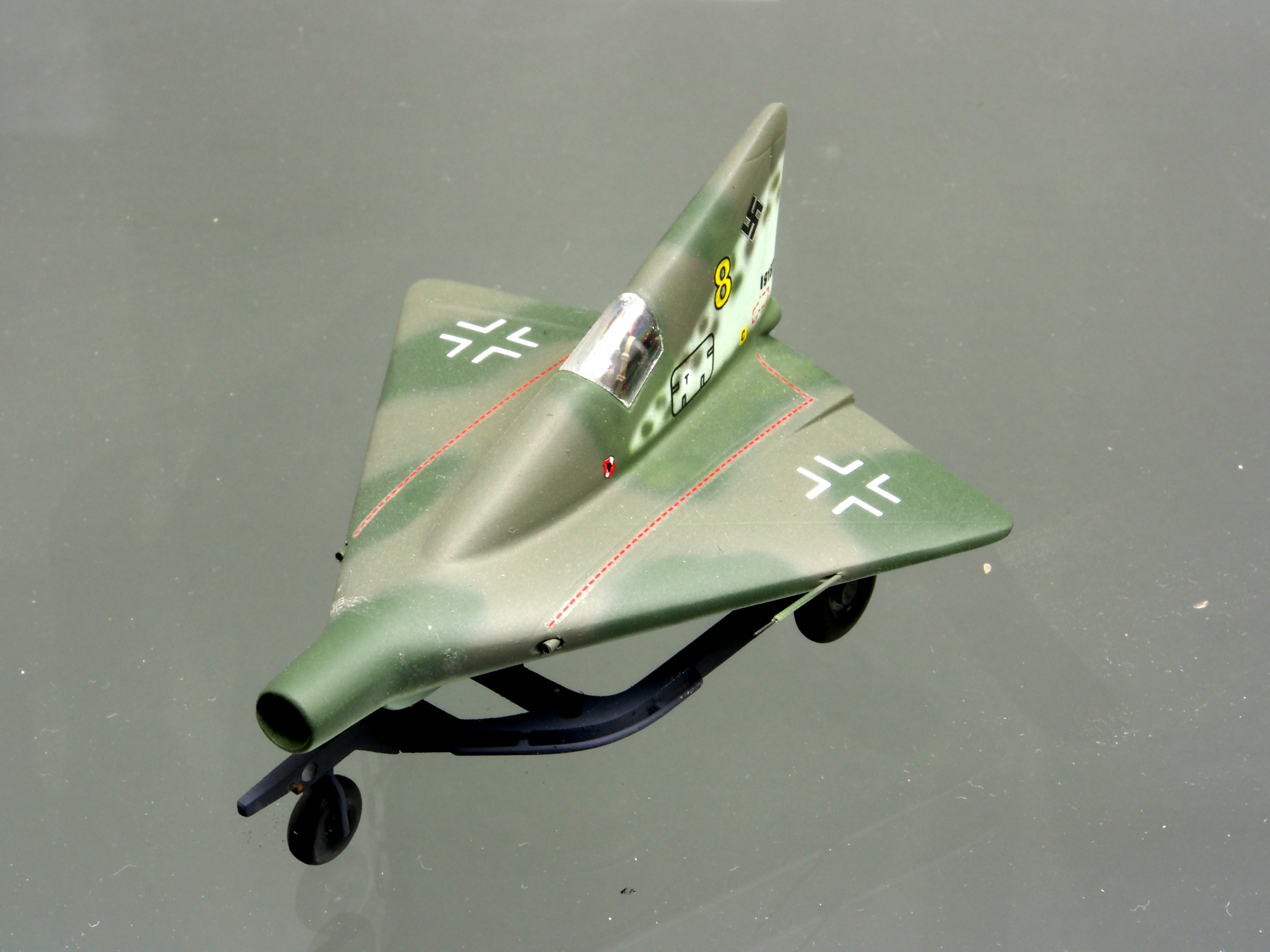
- Model of Lippisch P13a at the Technik Museum Speyer

General information
- Type: Interceptor
- Designer: Alexander Lippisch
- Status: Project
- Number built: 0

History
- Developed from: Lippisch P.11
- Variant: Lippisch DM-1

The Lippisch P.12, P.13a and P.13b were related design projects for a ramjet-powered delta wing interceptor aircraft studied in 1944 by German designer Alexander Lippisch. The P.12 and P.13a were unarmed, relying on reinforced wings to ram its opponent. The P.13a and b were to be powered by producer gas made in-flight from powdered coal. The DM-1 was a full-size glider, flown to test the P.12/13a low-speed aerodynamics. The design series were unrelated to the earlier P.13 produced by Messerschmitt's Lippisch design office.

== Design and development ==
=== Initial studies ===
During 1942, while still working on the Messerschmitt Me 163 rocket fighter, Alexander Lippisch developed a sharply-swept, leaf-shaped delta wing which he believed was capable of supersonic flight. Out of this and subsequent development of the P.11/Delta VI "power wing" through 1943 and early 1944, he conceived the idea of a hollow delta wing with its interior shaped like a ramjet duct. As an interceptor fighter it would achieve supersonic speeds but would carry no armament. Instead it would be heavily reinforced and would ram its opponent. Initially conceived as a disposable machine with the pilot bailing out at the end of the mission, a landing skid was later added. Launch to ramjet operational speed would be via catapult and/or booster rockets.

The resulting design was initially assumed to use conventional liquid fuel and designated the P.12. But Lippisch had also become convinced of the benefits of solid fuel for short-duration high-speed flight and adopted this power source as the P.13. The design of both types then proceeded in parallel.

From autumn 1944, Alexander Lippisch had opened his own development office at the Aviation Research Institute Vienna (LFW) in Wiener Neustadt together with his mathematician from Messerschmitt Hermann Behrbohm on half-time (who still on half time worked for Messerschmitt in the underground facility of the Oberbayerische Forschungsanstalt in Oberammergau). Lippisch and Willy Messerschmitt disagreed about the design, in which Lippisch did not want the rear wing, drag and worse performance.

In Wiener Neustadt, Lippisch worked on the further development of the delta wing (rear wingless) mini - (coal jet) fighter aircraft Lippisch P.13a, which at the end of the war became part of the Volksjäger program and finally taken over by the occupying US armed forces, that let them continue work.

=== P.12 ===
The P.12 was never fully defined but comprised studies of many variations. A model of it showed a typical configuration comprising a highly-swept delta flying wing with a protruding nose intake, raised cockpit canopy and single tail fin. Small turned-down winglets or "ears" were located at the wing tips. The wing centre section was hollow, with air ducts on either side of the cockpit leading to a large cavity which comprised the ramjet. The engine exhausted through a wide nozzle with control flaps above and below.

Later iterations included a thick tail fin almost as large as one wing and with its forward section comprising the pilot's cockpit, now fully raised above the wing, and/or a tubular central ramjet.

=== P.13a ===
The solid-fuel powered P.13 was one of several distinct Lippisch design studies to be so designated and became identified as the P/13a. It underwent much the same variations of form as the P.12, being presented in a brochure with the large fin and integral raised cockpit, and with an articulated, double-hinged landing skid. The wing trailing edge is angled slightly forwards and the downturned tip surfaces have been discarded. The outer wing sections could be folded upwards for transportation by rail.

A variant with a rectangular canard foreplane was wind-tunnel tested. This was not really consistent with ramming and there are other indications that conventional gun armament was being considered.

As conventional fuels were in extremely short supply by late 1944, Lippisch proposed that the P.13a be powered by coal. Lippisch soon came to conclude that this might even be more effective than liquid fuel, as the location of combustion was more precisely controllable. Initially, it was proposed to employ a wire-mesh basket holding even-sized granules of brown coal, placed in the lower region of the internal airflow. The burning coal gave off carbon monoxide (CO) gas which was mixed and combusted with the upper air flow downstream. The arrangement proved inefficient.

To replace it a spinning circular basket was developed, revolving on a vertical axis at 60 rpm. The hot exhaust would be mixed with cooler bypass air to improve thermodynamic efficiency, before being expelled through the rear nozzle. Other fuels considered promising, due to their ability to generate flammable vapours, included bituminous coal, or pine wood heat-soaked in oil or paraffin. A burner and drum were built and tested successfully in Vienna.

=== Glider studies and the DM-1 ===
A scale model of the P12/13 configuration was successfully tested at Spitzerberg Airfield, near Vienna in Austria, in 1944.

The P.13a had reached a stage where full-scale aerodynamic trials would be possible. A glider with the same general design and 6.7 metres (22 ft 0 in) wingspan, but with the intake and exhaust faired in, was built as the DM-1. Lippisch however took little interest; having moved on from the design, he set up the glider project only to keep students of Darmstadt and Munich Universities from being drafted into a by-then hopeless war.

The DM-1 had not been finished when it was captured by American forces. The Americans ordered Lippisch's team to complete the glider, and it was then shipped to the United States where it was test-flown. According to the National Advisory Committee for Aeronautics the results were positive and lessons learned were incorporated into NASA's research aircraft of the 1950s and on.

=== P.13b ===
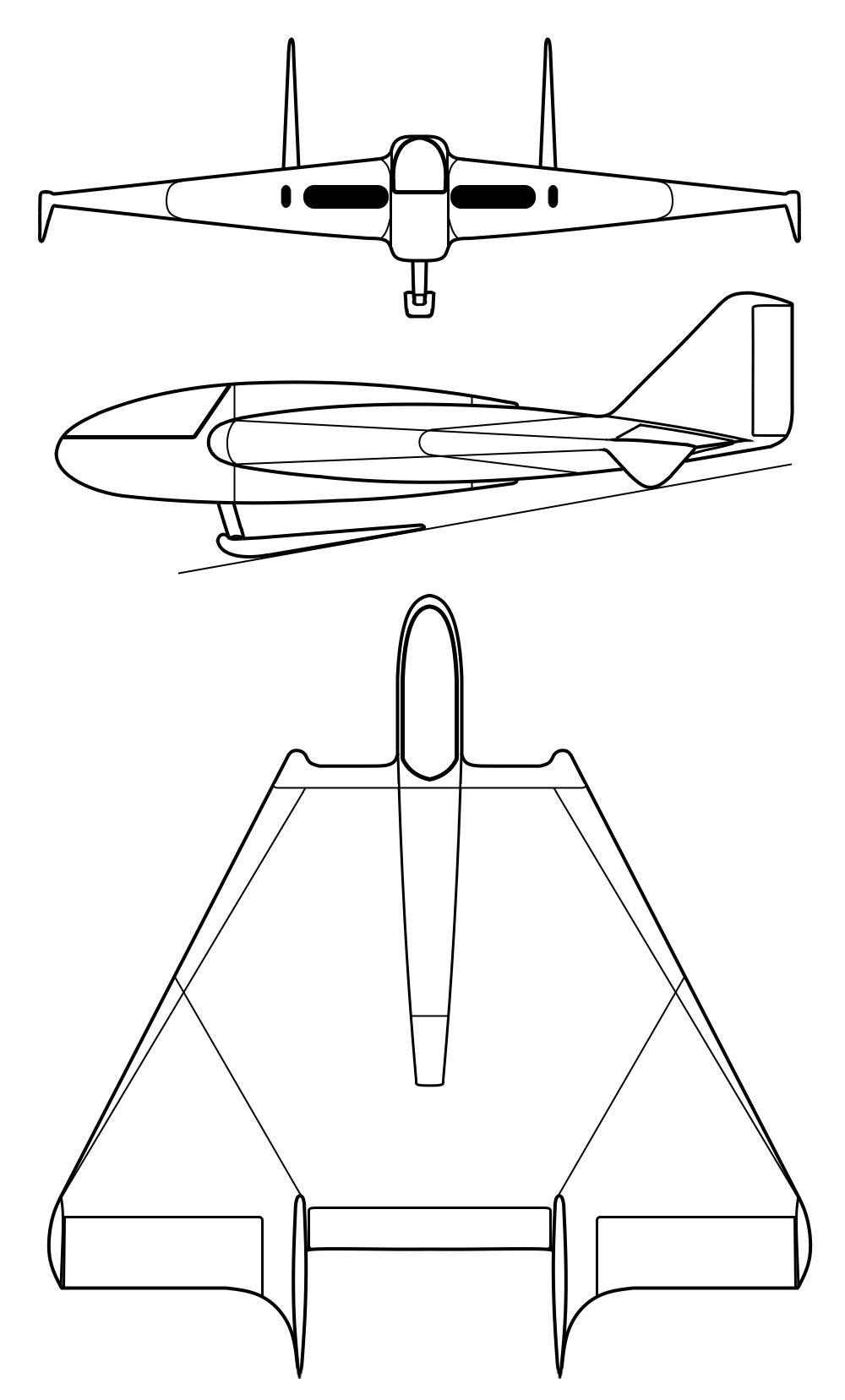
Modern drawing of the P.13b

Before the DM.10 was begun, in December 1944 Lippisch's attention moved to a revised design similar in some respects to the earlier P.11 / Delta VI but keeping the P.13a's sharp sweep angle and solid-fuel ramjet with rotating burner.

The wing was essentially that of the P.12/13 but larger at 6.9 metres (22 ft 8 in) span and cut short at the front for unswept air intakes at the roots. Like the P.11 it had a conventional nose nacelle and cockpit with small twin tail fins either side of a centre section inset on the straight wing trailing edge. The landing skid was moved further back and refined, with a return of the early P.12's small downturned winglets or fins on the wingtips to act as outrigger bumpers when landing.

Wind tunnel tests had just begun by the time the Russians arrived in Vienna and Lippisch had to flee.

=== Post-World War II ===
The Lippisch P.13a delta wing technology is also the basis of the Dassault Mirage and Saab 35 Draken design after the war. Development that Lippisch's mathematician Hermann Behrbohm later participated in from 1946 for BEE (French Aerodynamic Research and Development Institute, today part of the Deutsch-Französisches Forschungsinstitut Saint-Louis) and from 1952 for Saab until 1970.

== Specifications (P.13a) ==
Data from Sharp (2015)

General characteristics

- Crew: 1
- Length: 6.7 m (22 ft 0 in)
- Wingspan: 6 m (19 ft 8 in)
- Height: 3.25 m (10 ft 8 in)
- Gross weight: 2,295 kg (5,060 lb)
- Powerplant: 1 × Kronach Lorin coal-burning ramjet

== Replicas ==
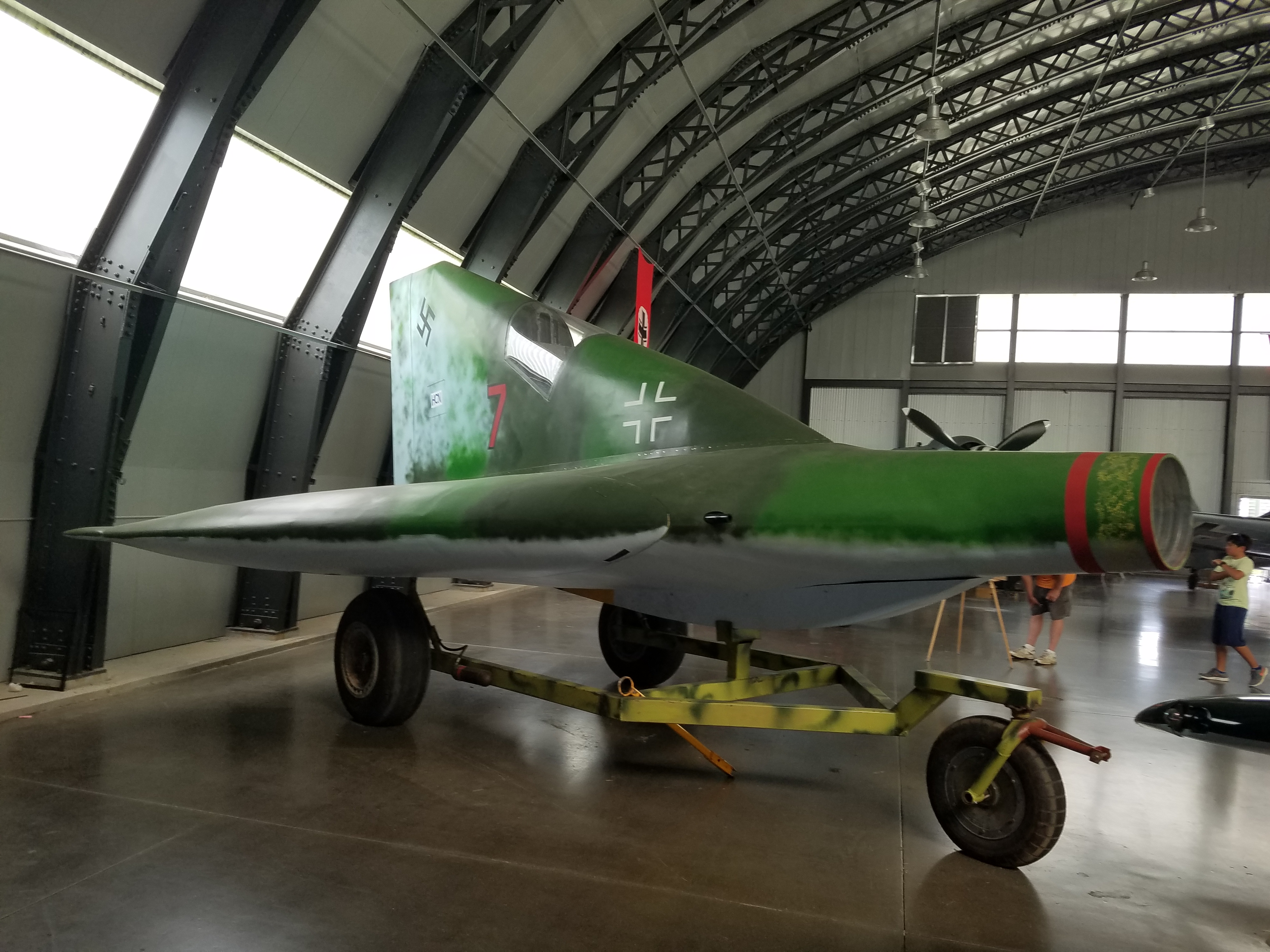
Replica in the Military Aviation Museum collection.

There is a static replica at the Military Aviation Museum in Virginia Beach, Virginia located in the Cottbus hangar.

== See also ==
- Blohm & Voss BV 40 ram glider

Related lists

- List of military aircraft of Germany
- List of World War II military aircraft of Germany
