= Lippisch Delta VI =

Delta VI

General information
- Type: Experimental
- Designer: Alexander Lippisch
- Status: Project

History
- Developed from: P.11
- Developed into: P.12 and 13a/b

The Lippisch Delta VI was a proposed single-seat, twin-jet experimental delta flying wing aircraft begun in 1943 by German designer Alexander Lippisch, as the developed version of the P.11 bomber project begun while he was still working for Messerschmitt in 1942. The only prototype was destroyed in June 1944 while still under construction.

== Design and development ==
=== P.11 bomber for Messerschmitt ===
During 1942, while still working on the Messerschmitt Me 163 rocket fighter, Alexander Lippisch conceived a larger but similarly tailless bomber with twin jet engines buried in a thick wing, designated P.11.

=== P.11 flying-wing fighter ===
Following his departure for his own independent design office near Vienna in Austria, Lippisch returned to the P.11 and radically revised it. The fuselage shrank to a short forward cockpit nacelle. The engines were placed quite close together inside the wing, with intakes in the roots and the otherwise straight trailing edge cut back for the exhausts. The wing planform was a cropped delta of moderate sweep. Small twin fins were located either side of the trailing edge cutback. Construction of a full-scale mock-up began in 1943.

=== Delta VI ===
By the time work on an experimental prototype was begun, the project had become the Delta VI. Around this time Lippisch conceived of a "power wing", a hollow monocoque shell whose interior formed the internal duct of the main powerplant. He initially intended the Delta VI to have such a wing construction, but later drawings suggest that this was too difficult to realise under the prevailing war conditions.

On 16 and 24 June 1944 the USAF bombed Vienna, destroying the factory where prototype V1 was under construction and killing over forty of his co-workers. The prototype was moved to a new site but could not be completed before the Soviet arrival in Vienna caused Lippisch and his colleagues to flee.

Lippisch went on to further develop the power wing concept in his P.12 and P.13a and b projects.

== Specifications (P.11 fighter) ==
Data from Sharp (2015)

General characteristics

- Crew: 1
- Length: 7.0 m (23 ft)
- Wingspan: 10.74 m (35 ft 3 in)
- Wing area: 50.0 m^{2} (538 sq ft)
- Aspect ratio: 2.3
- Gross weight: 7,257 kg (16,000 lb)
- Powerplant: 2 × Junkers Jumo 004 axial-flow turbojet

Performance

- Maximum speed: 1,038 km/h (645 mph, 560 kn) at 19,500 feet (5,900 m)
- Cruise speed: 850 km/h (528 mph, 459 kn)
- Range: 2,990 km (1,860 mi, 1,620 nmi)

== See also ==
Aircraft of comparable role, configuration, and era

- Horten Ho 229

Related lists

- List of military aircraft of Germany
- List of World War II military aircraft of Germany
