= Anna Strunsky =

American author and socialist (1877-1964)

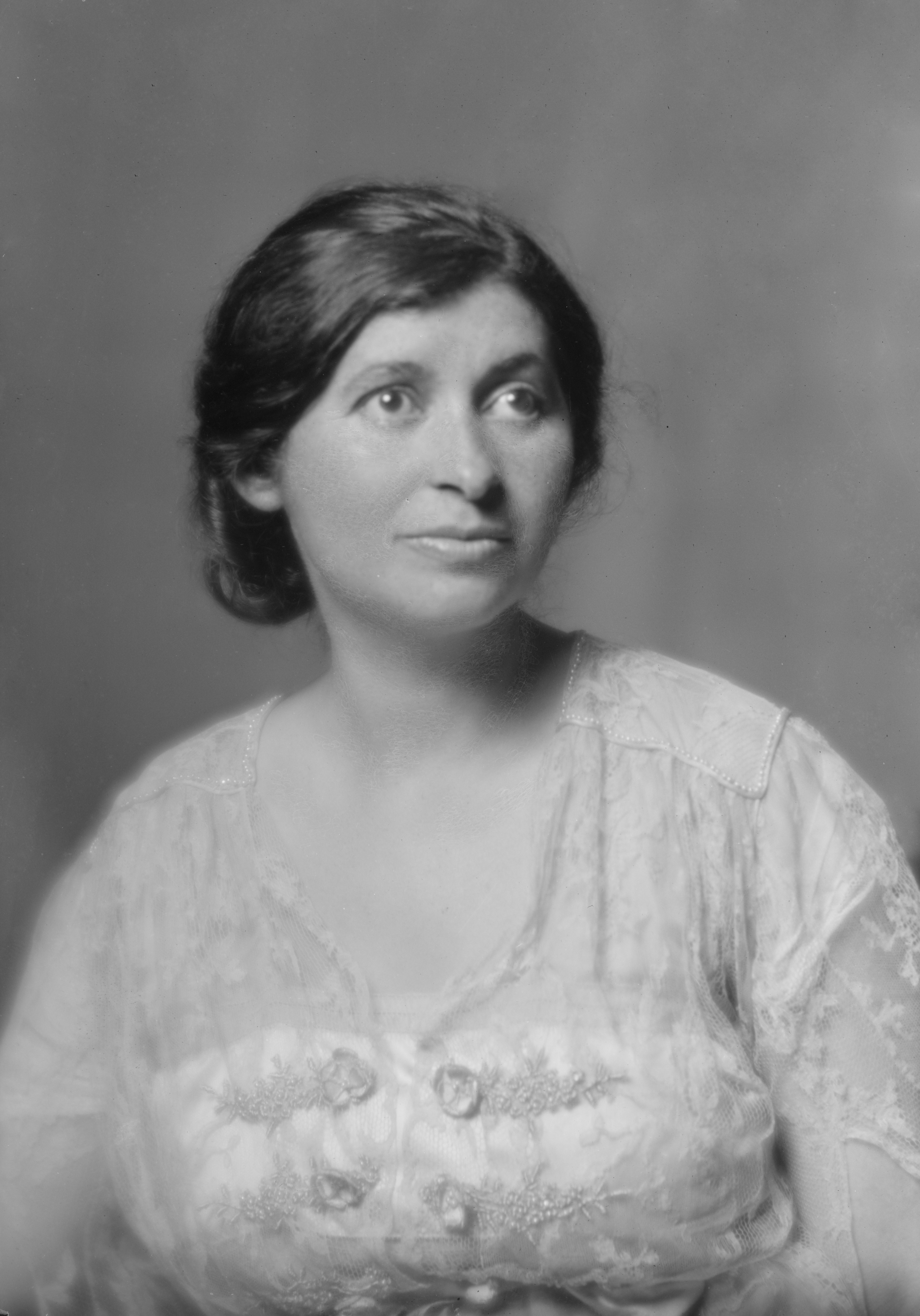
- Born: March 2, 1877; Liona Raion, Russia, now Belarus.
- Died: February 25, 1964 (aged 86)
- Burial place: Crown Hill Cemetery and Arboretum, Section 1, Niche Lot 72, September 3, 1965
- Education: Stanford University, 1896-1898
- Occupation(s): Writer and Jewish Socialist
- Spouse: William English Walling
- Children: 4, 3 girls and 1 boy.

Anna Strunsky Walling (née Strunsky; March 21, 1877 – February 25, 1964), usually known as Anna Strunsky, was an American author and advocate of socialism, known for her novels and writings on social issues and the labor movement. Born in the Russian Empire, she emigrated to the United States as a child, later becoming active in socialist movements in San Francisco and New York City. While studying at Stanford University, she became friends with writer Jack London, with whom she co-authored the 1903 epistolary novel The Kempton-Wace Letters. In 1906, she married American socialist William English Walling, and they remained active in socialist and progressive causes. Strunsky opposed war and advocated for the abolition of capital punishment.

== Early life and education ==
Strunsky was born on March 21, 1877, into a Jewish family in Babinots (now Babinovitch), in the Liozna Raion, Russian Empire (now Belarus). In 1886, she emigrated to New York City with her parents, Elias Strunsky and Anna Horowitz, at the age of nine. Her siblings included an older brother, Max, and a younger sister, Rose, to whom she was particularly close. In 1893, the family relocated to San Francisco, where they lived with her brother Max, who had established himself as a doctor in the city.

As a teenager, Strunsky joined the Socialist Labor Party and remained committed to socialism throughout her life. She attended Stanford University from 1896 to 1898, where she formed a close friendship with writer Jack London, with whom she frequently discussed social and political issues.

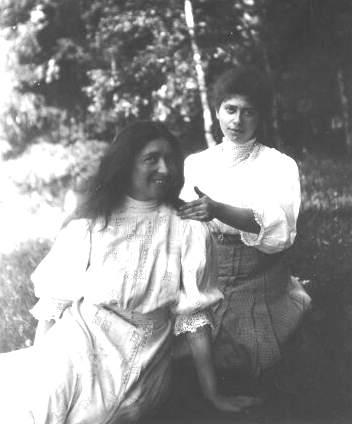
Anna Strunsky (left) and her sister Rose during the time Rose attended Stanford University.

== Socialist and writer ==
Strunsky and her sister Rose, who also attended Stanford, became leading members of the turn-of-the-20th-century San Francisco intellectual scene, part of a radical group of young Californian writers and artists known as The Crowd. It included George Sterling, Herman Whitaker, Ambrose Bierce, and others.

With Jack London, Strunsky co-authored the epistolary novel The Kempton-Wace Letters in 1903. After London's death in 1916, Strunsky published a memoir of their relationship.

In 1906, Strunsky and her sister traveled to Russia as correspondents for William English Walling, whom she later married. After returning to the United States, they reported on issues like the Springfield race riot of 1908, and Walling co-founded the NAACP. They had four children before separating. Strunsky remained active in socialist causes throughout her life, including joining the War Resisters League and the American League to Abolish Capital Punishment.

== Death and legacy ==
Strunsky died on February 25, 1964, in New York. She was survived by her four children: Rosamond, Anna, Georgia, and Hayden Walling. Hayden, an architect known for his work on Cape Cod, died in 1981. Rosamond (1910–1999) became a painter and was married to Edward Corbett.

Her papers are held by the Bancroft Library at University of California, Berkeley, the Yale University Library, and the Huntington Library.
