= Lorin =

Lorin is a given name with a variety of origins and meanings. The most common origin of Lorin and its variants, Lorne, Loren and Lorn, is Scottish, coming from the first king, Loarn mac Eirc, of Dál Riata, a medieval kingdom in the western Highlands of Scotland, which became part of the Kingdom of Alba. The region is still known as Lorn or Lorne. The meaning of Lorin in old Gaelic is "fox" or "from the land." In some other traditions, the name derives from a bay or laurel plant; of Laurentum (wreathed/crowned with laurel). Laurentum, in turn is from laurus (laurel), from the place of laurel trees, laurel branch, laurel wreath. Laurentum was also a city in ancient Italy. It is also a Kurdish female given name, derived from the Kurmanji word lorî, meaning "lullaby." Some sources recognize a linguistic connection to Germanic and Norse words meaning forsaken or forlorn, but these connections seem unlikely.

Notable people with the name include:

- Lorin Blodget (1823–1901), American physicist and writer
- Lorin F. Deland (1855-1917), American football coach and co-author with Walter Camp of "Football" (1896)
- Lorin Farr (1820–1909), Mormon pioneer and the first mayor of Ogden, Utah
- Lorin Maazel (1930–2014), conductor, violinist and composer
- Lorin J. Mullins (1917–1993), American biophysicist
- Lorin Solon (1892–1967), All-American football player
- Lorin C. Woolley (1856–1934), Mormon fundamentalist leader and a proponent of plural marriage
- Lorin F. Wheelwright (1909–1987), American Latter-day Saint hymnwriter, composer, musical instructor and educator
- Lorin Wright (1862–1920), one of four Wright brothers, named for a community chosen randomly from a map

== Surname ==
Those with Lorin as a surname include:

- René Lorin (1877–1933), inventor of the ramjet (patented in 1908)

== See also ==
- Fondation Lorin, arts centre on the Rue Es-Siaghine in Tangier, Morocco
- James Lorin Richards House, historic house at 47 Kirkstall and 22 Oakwood Roads in Newton, Massachusetts
- Kronach Lorin, small ramjet engine for aircraft propulsion, statically tested in Vienna during World War II
- Lorin District, Berkeley, California
- Lorin Griset Academy, continuation high school in the Santa Ana Unified School District in Orange County, California
