= Rose Strunsky Lorwin =

Jewish Russian-American translator and socialist

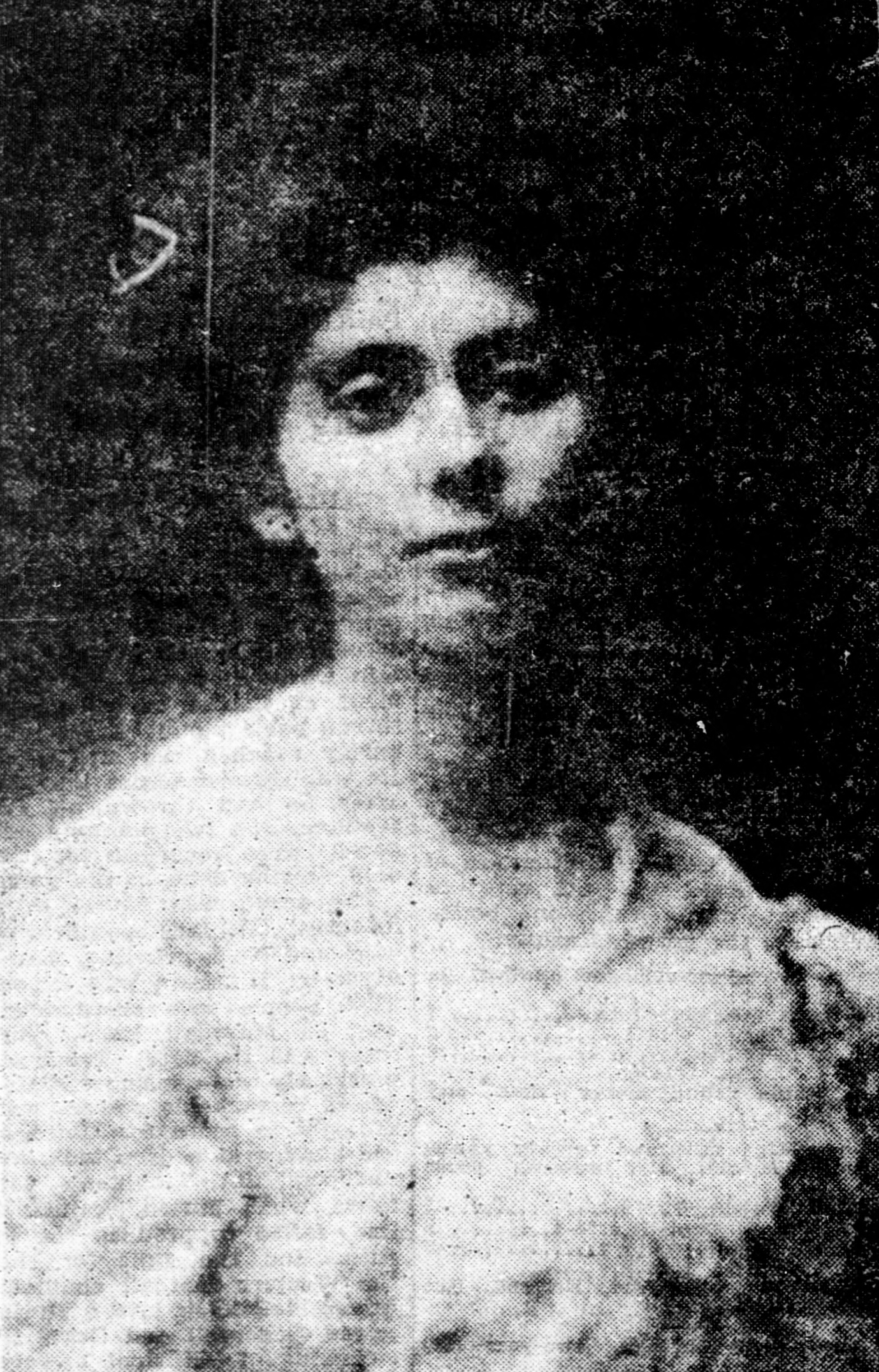
Rose Strunsky c. 1905

Rose Strunsky Lorwin (1884, Russia – 1963, New York City) was a Jewish Russian-American translator and socialist based in New York City.

== Early life and education ==
Rose Strunsky was born to a Jewish Russian family in what is now Belarus and was part of the Russian Empire. She had older siblings Anna Strunsky and Max. In 1886 her family emigrated by ship to the United States, settling in New York City. The sisters learned English and attended public schools. After several years the family moved to San Francisco, where they lived with her older brother, Dr. Max Strunsky, who had become a physician. Like her older sister Anna Strunsky, Rose attended Stanford University.

== Activist career ==
Rose and Anna became active in socialist politics and San Francisco's literary scene, where they were members of "The Crowd", which included writer Jack London. In 1905 the sisters travelled together in Russia as correspondents for William English Walling, an American socialist who had a revolutionary news bureau. Anna Strunsky married him later that year, before the three returned to the United States. They lived in Greenwich Village in New York City in the 1910s.

Rose Strunsky married Lewis Lorwin in 1920. They had two children together and lived in New York. Throughout her life she worked as a translator. Her translations into English include Maxim Gorky's The Confession, the journal of Leo Tolstoy and Leon Trotsky's Literature and Revolution. Rose Strunsky Lorwin died in New York in 1963.

She was the mother of Val, Boris and Rosalind Lorwin. Her daughter became a psychology professor.

== Works ==
- Abraham Lincoln, 1914
- (transl.) Maxim Gorky, The confession, 1916
- (transl,) The Journal of Leo Tolstoi, Knopf, 1917
- (transl.) Leon Trotsky, Literature and Revolution, International Publishers, 1925
