= The Kempton-Wace Letters =

Novel by Jack London and Anna Strunsky

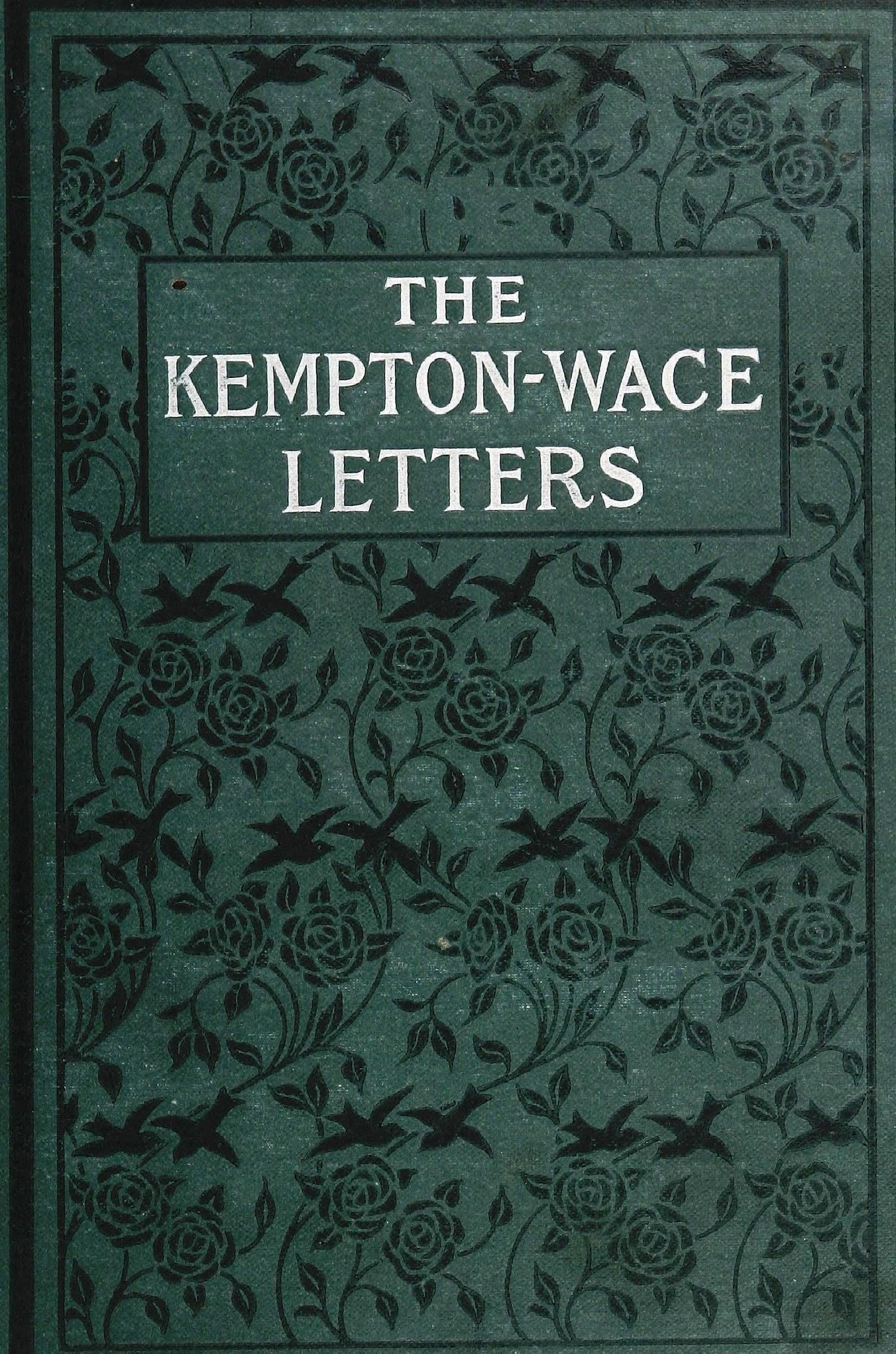
- First edition cover
- Author: Jack London, Anna Strunsky
- Language: English
- Genre: Epistolary novel
- Publisher: Macmillan
- Publication date: 1903
- Publication place: United States
- Media type: Print (hardback & paperback)
- OCLC: 476015

The Kempton-Wace Letters was a 1903 epistolary novel written jointly by Americans Jack London and Anna Strunsky, then based in San Francisco, California. It was published anonymously.

== Summary ==
The novel presents a discussion of the philosophy of love and sex, written in the form of a series of letters between two men, "Herbert Wace," a young scientist, and his father "Dane Kempton," an elderly poet. Writer Jack London wrote "Wace's" letters, and Anna Strunsky wrote "Kempton's." In the late 19th century, the authors were part of a San Francisco radical literary group known as "The Crowd."

Kempton makes the case for feeling and emotion, while Wace proceeds "scientifically" and analyzes love in Darwinian terms:

I purpose to order my affairs in a rational manner....Wherefore I marry Hester Stebbins. I am not impelled by the archaic sex madness of the beast, nor by the obsolescent romance madness of later-day man. I contract a tie which reason tells me is based upon health and sanity and compatibility. My intellect shall delight in that tie.

Initially the public was piqued by the anonymity of the writers and the book was moderately successful. London biographer Russ Kingman praised the book; he quoted the Buffalo Commercial as admiring the "sheer charm of its prose" and saying the book "holds firmly its place in the front rank of the best of the season's publications."

The New York Times was less charitable. It opened its review with the terse line, "The sex problem again." It complained that "Nothing that the scientist says is new, nothing that the poet says is new. The thing has been thrashed out some millions of times... Nor does the unnamed author infuse into either Wace or Kempton anything to give human personality or appeal.... As a story [it] falls flat; as a discussion of a topic as old as interesting, as overworked."

Joseph Noel says that George Sterling described London's portion of the book as "a spiritual misprint, a typographical error half a volume long" and says "His vocabulary, in the letters of Herbert Wace, sounds as if taken that day from an encyclopedia by a conscientious sophomore."

Biographers have been intrigued by The Kempton-Wace Letters for the light it seems to shed on Jack London's life and ideas. Strunsky was named as the co-respondent in Jack London's divorce from his first wife, Bessie, but biographers generally agree that his relation with the younger Strunsky was platonic. They were active in socialism and the literary group, "The Crowd", in San Francisco.

In the novel, London expresses his theories about the "Mother-Woman" and the "Mate-Woman," roles which seem to correspond to the roles played by his first wife and his second. After London's death in 1916, Strunsky published a memoir in The Masses in 1917 about their relationship.
