= Kronach Lorin =

German ramjet project

- Type: Ramjet engine
- National origin: Nazi Germany
- Designer: Alexander Lippisch
- First run: 1944
- Status: Cancelled
- Number built: 0

The Kronach Lorin was a small ramjet engine, for aircraft propulsion, that was statically tested in Vienna during the later stages of World War II. It was intended to be used in the German interceptor planes Lippisch P.13a and Lippisch P.13b.

It was initially proposed that a wire-mesh basket holding coal be mounted behind a nose air intake, protruding slightly into the airflow and ignited by a gas burner. Following wind-tunnel testing of the ramjet and the coal basket, modifications were incorporated to provide more efficient combustion. The coal was to take the form of 135–180 kg (300–400 lb) of small granules instead of irregular lumps, to produce a controlled and even burn, and the basket was altered to a mesh drum revolving on a vertical axis at 60 rpm. A jet of flame from tanks of bottled gas would fire into the basket once the P.13a had reached operating speed (above 320 km/h), whether by using a RATO unit or being towed. The air passing through the ramjet would take the gases from the burning coal towards the rear where they would mix under high pressure with clean air taken from a separate intake. The resulting mixture of gas would then be directed out through a rear nozzle to provide thrust. A burner and drum were built and tested successfully in Vienna by the design team before the end of the war. The theoretical flight time was 45 minutes.

Tested as a concept but never used in flight, the original idea was to produce an engine that could overcome fuel shortages and disruption, supplies of conventional fuels being in very short supply towards the end of World War 2.
