= Val R. Lorwin =

- Born: July 21, 1907; New York City
- Died: December 8, 1982 (aged 75); Eugene, Oregon
- Known for: American civil servant, academic, target of McCarthyism

Val Rogin Lorwin (July 21, 1907 – December 8, 1982) was an American civil servant, economist, and historian. He supported socialism. From the late 1940s, he was repeatedly investigated while and after he worked for the United States State Department, harassed for alleged Communist activities, named by Senator Joe McCarthy as one of more than 50 Communists at the State Department, and was cleared every time. Restored to his position and given backpay, he soon left the government to complete his doctorate at Cornell University and had an academic career. Lorwin's case gained national attention as an extreme example of abuses possible under the federal government's system of security investigations.

== Early years ==
Lorwin was born in New York City, the son of Lewis Lorwin, a noted labor economist and Rose Strunsky Lorwin, socialist and translator. His mother had immigrated as a young child with her family from Belarus. Lorwin graduated from Cornell University and received a master's degree in history from Ohio State University. In the spring of 1932, he received an American Field Service fellowship for study in France during the 1932-33 academic year. Two decades later, he returned to Cornell and earned his doctorate.

== Career ==
In the employ of the Taft family, Lorwin helped to edit the Taft Presidential papers. Lorwin married Madge Grossman; together they joined the Socialist Party in 1935. They worked on behalf of the Socialist-supported Southern Tenant Farmers Union against the Sharecroppers' Union, which was led by their Communist rivals. Both groups were working to aid landless groups achieve better working conditions and pay, and extend their influence among the dispossessed. African Americans and many poor whites had been largely disenfranchised throughout the South since the turn of the century, when those states passed laws and constitutions creating barriers to voter registration.

Lorwin also challenged the Communists for control of the United Federal Workers of America and other organizations.

Lorwin left the Socialist Party in 1938. During the Great Depression and the administration of President Franklin D. Roosevelt, Lorwin worked for several New Deal agencies in Washington, D.C.

During World War II Lorwin served in Europe as an Army lieutenant assigned to the staff of the Office of Strategic Services, the predecessor of the Civil Intelligence Agency (CIA). Lorwin joined the U.S. State Department in 1946.

== Loyalty investigations ==
In 1948, as part of the government's increased sensitivity to security risks with the beginning of the Cold War and fears of Communism, Lorwin became the subject of a loyalty investigation. When it was dropped in January 1949, he took a leave of absence to write a book on the French labor movement.

On February 20, 1950, while Lorwin was in France, Senator Joseph McCarthy gave a speech in the Senate in which he detailed charges against 81 State Department employees whom he identified as security risks. He said Lorwin, number 54 on the list, was "connected with a number of Communist-front organizations." Lorwin was the only person named that day who was indicted.

Lorwin, now the chief of the European Section of the State Department's Division of International Labor, Social and Health Affairs, faced another investigation before the newly created State Department Loyalty Board. It exonerated him of any Communist ties. Lorwin guessed correctly that the charges against him were based on the testimony of a former college friend and Washington roommate, Harold W. Metz, though the State Department never identified his accuser. Lorwin believed that Metz's testimony reflected confusion between the Socialist Party, which he had supported, and the Communist Party, which he said he had always loathed. In February 1951, the State Department suspended him as a security risk, a move for which McCarthy took credit. When McCarthy named Lorwin again in August 1951, Lorwin, then on leave from the State Department, replied:

I have never been sympathetic to the Communist party, to the Soviet dictatorship, or to the Soviet or Communist outlook on life. Nor is this merely a negative matter of simple non-communism. My active anti-communism can be attested to by many of the most knowing anti-Communists in Government and labor and liberal circles. I was one of those who fought against Communist influence in Washington liberal and Government employee trade union circles in the Nineteen Thirties and early Nineteen Forties, long before it was fashionable or profitable to do so, and long before most liberals—or the Government itself—had awakened to the "Communist danger."

Lorwin also said: "I happen to have years of rather cantankerous anti-Communist activity on my record long before it became fashionable to be anti-Communist."

In March 1952, the Loyalty Board gave Lorwin a complete clearance again and ordered him restored to duty with full back pay. Lorwin returned to the State Department briefly. He resigned on June 17, 1952, to return to Cornell, where he obtained his doctorate.

In September 1953, he became an assistant professor at the University of Chicago. On December 4, 1953, a Federal grand jury indicted him on three counts of perjury in denying any Communist affiliation to State Department investigators in December 1950. The University allowed him leave with pay while under indictment. As the trial neared, the government revealed that Justice Department attorney William A. Gallagher had misrepresented Lorwin's case to the grand jury. Gallagher had said the FBI had two witnesses to corroborate Metz' testimony. He also told the grand jury that it was pointless to call Lorwin to testify because, "like other Communists," he would take the Fifth Amendment rather than answer questions, despite the fact that Lorwin had never done so in the course of the previous investigations. The case was dismissed at the government's request, and Gallagher was dismissed.

Lorwin issued a statement saying:

The government has admitted the obvious fact that there could be no other case against me than that based on misrepresentation, falsehood or obstinate misunderstanding. The allegations of communism were particularly outrageous in view of the long record of vigorous anti-communism in my work and outside activities. No responsible official of the Department of Justice who took the trouble to read that record [of the State Department loyalty hearings] could have had the slightest doubt that the department was prosecuting an innocent man.

The New York Times used Lorwin's case as an example of problems with the government's security program and asked: "What safeguards now exist to prevent such miscarriage of justice as was suffered by Professor Val Lorwin?" Attorney General Herbert Brownell said: "We have a duty over and above prosecution and convictions to see that justice is done." He was later quoted saying, "Mr. Gallagher indicated that he felt it was better to indict Mr. Lorwin on slight evidence rather than appear before a Senate committee to explain why he had not obtained any indictment." It later transpired that the two promised witnesses were FBI informants, one who was repeating hearsay and one who said the FBI had misrepresented the information he provided.

Time described Lorwin, then an associate professor, as "tired but unterrified."

Lorwin said:

Not one person—or rather, only one person—turned his back on me. People who were only acquaintances became my friends when they heard I was involved in this case. ... People I knew joked about having their telephones tapped, but they phoned me anyhow. There is said to be a great deal of fear along the Potomac, but I can testify it has not taken over the city.

Lorwin's case became an example for critics of the government's security processes. One wrote that the rules "permit double, treble, and quadruple jeopardy. In fact, an employee cannot even be sure that he is out of jeopardy until he has left the government, and perhaps not even then—as Val Lorwin discovered." During the State Department investigations, Lorwin was not told the names of those who had furnished information against him. The government named its witnesses only when preparing for the trial.

== Later career ==
As Professor of History, Lorwin taught at the University of Oregon from 1957 until his retirement in 1973. He authored numerous articles on the smaller European democracies and contributed to several disciplines, including history, economics, political science and sociology. His principal work, The French Labor Movement, appeared in 1954.

In 1964, Lorwin was elected to the Council on Research in Economic History of the Economic History Association. He was awarded a Guggenheim Fellowship in economics in 1966.

Lorwin died of cancer at his home in Eugene, Oregon, on December 8, 1982. His wife survived him.

== Works ==
- Val R. Lorwin, The French Labor Movement (Harvard University Press, 1954), in the series: Wertheim Publications in Industrial Relations
- Val R. Lorwin, Labour and Working Conditions in Modern Europe (Macmillan, 1967)
- Val R. Lorwin and Jacob M. Price, eds., Dimensions of the Past: Materials, Problems, and Opportunities for Quantitative Work in History (Yale University Press, 1972)
- Alice Hanson Cook, Val R. Lorwin, and Arlene Kaplan Daniels, eds., Women and Trade Unions in Eleven Industrialized Countries (Philadelphia: Temple University Press, 1984)
- Alice Hanson Cook, Val R. Lorwin, and Arlene Kaplan Daniels, eds., The Most Difficult Revolution: Women and Trade Unions (Cornell University Press, 1992)
