= Lewis L. Lorwin =

American economist (1883–1970)

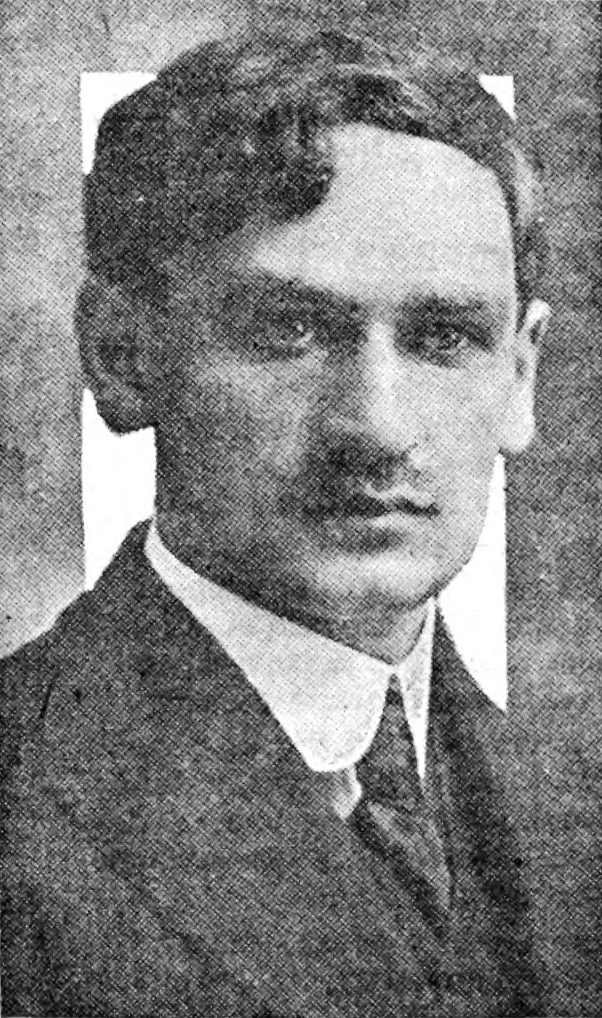
- Born: Louis Levitzky Levine; December 4, 1883; Kyiv, Ukraine
- Died: June 6, 1970 (aged 86)
- Education: Columbia University
- Occupations: Labor historian, economic planner
- Spouse: Rose Strunsky Lorwin (m. 1920)
- Children: Boris Lorwin, Rosa Lorwin, Val Rogin Lorwin

Lewis Levitzki Lorwin (December 4, 1883 – June 6, 1970) was an American economist, economic planner, and labor historian of Ukrainian-Jewish origin.

== Life ==
Lorwin was born Louis Levitzky Levine on December 4, 1883, near Kyiv. Levine received his doctorate at Columbia University in 1912. He then studied at Columbia and the University of Montana. At Montana, he was Professor of Economics from 1916 to 1919 and authored Taxation of Mines in Montana. He was suspended from his position for his writings on the mining industry, but later reinstated with support from the American Association of University Professors.

In 1920, he was a spokesman for the New York World and then served as a professor at Beloit College. In 1922, he accepted a position as the Russia correspondent for the Chicago Daily News.

In 1924, Levine published a history of the International Ladies Garment Workers Union under the title The Woman's Garment Workers. This brought him to the attention of the Brookings Institution, which hired him as a labor specialist. At Brookings, Levine changed his name to Lewis L. Lorwin, which his biographers have said was a choice to hide his Russian-Jewish origins.

While working for Brookings, Lorwin established ties to the Frankfurt Institute for Social Research. He later became instrumental in migrating the intellectuals of the Frankfurt School to Columbia University.

Throughout his career, Lorwin was an advocate of economic planning, culminating in his work as a drafter of the Marshall Plan for post-WWII European reconstruction. Lorwin was appointed director of the U.S. Office of International Trade. He was criticized by Red Scare conservatives for remarks he had made in the 1930s and resigned his position in 1952.

Lorwin married Rose Strunsky in 1920 and they had three children: Boris, Rosa, and Val Lorwin. Lorwin died in New York City on June 6, 1970.

== Writings ==
- The Women's Garment Workers: A History of the International Ladies' Garment Workers' Union (1924)
- Labor and Internationalism (1929)
- "The Origins of Economic Planning," The Survey 67, no. 9 (February 1932)
- The American Federation of Labor: History, Policies, and Prospects (1933)
- Economic Consequences of the Second World War (1941)
- The International Labor Movement: History, Policies, Outlook (1953)
