= Cottbus Air Base =

Former air base in Cottbus, Brandenburg, Germany

Cottbus Air Base Flugplatz Cottbus-Nord
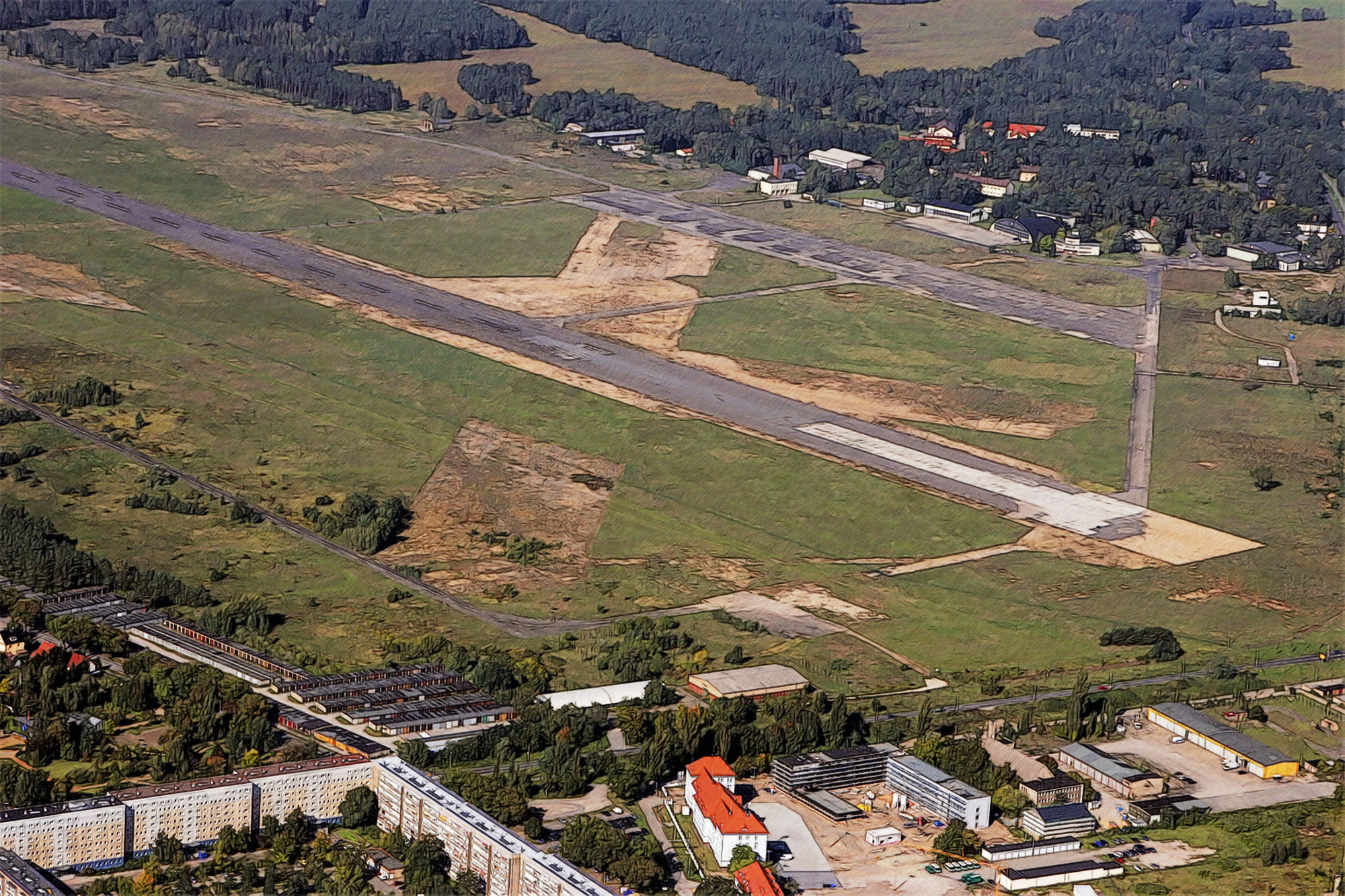
- Former Cottbus Air Base in 2010
- IATA: none; ICAO: ETHT

Summary
- Airport type: Military
- Operator: Flugplatzmuseum Cottbus
- Location: Cottbus
- Elevation AMSL: 220 ft (67 m)
- Coordinates: 51°46′7″N 14°17′43″E
- Website: http://www.flugplatzmuseumcottbus.de/

Map
- Location of airport in Germany

Runways
Direction	Length		Surface
Direction	ft	m	Surface
08/26	7,741	2,360	Concrete
- Source: Military Airfield Directory

Cottbus Air Base (German: Flugplatz Cottbus-Nord – "Airport Cottbus-North") (ICAO: ETHT) is a former military airport that is 2 km (1.2 miles) north-west of Cottbus in Brandenburg, Germany.

== History ==
During World War II the air base in Cottbus was used by the Luftwaffe and during the 1970s and 1980s by the National People's Army. Following German reunification until 2004, the air base was also used by the Bundeswehr.

== Present ==
The airport is currently closed to air traffic, although the concrete runway has been designated for use by cargo flights in the event of an emergency. There is an aerospace museum on site, the entire runway while still present, is now in use as a solar electric power farm with solar panels mounted on a framework above the runway. The runway overruns at the SWW AND NEE ends of the runway also remain but are not covered by solar panels.

== Future ==
Having been bought by the local government in 2007, the city of Cottbus plans to turn the former air base into an industrial park, creating around 1,000 jobs.
