= William English Walling =

American labor leader (1877–1936)

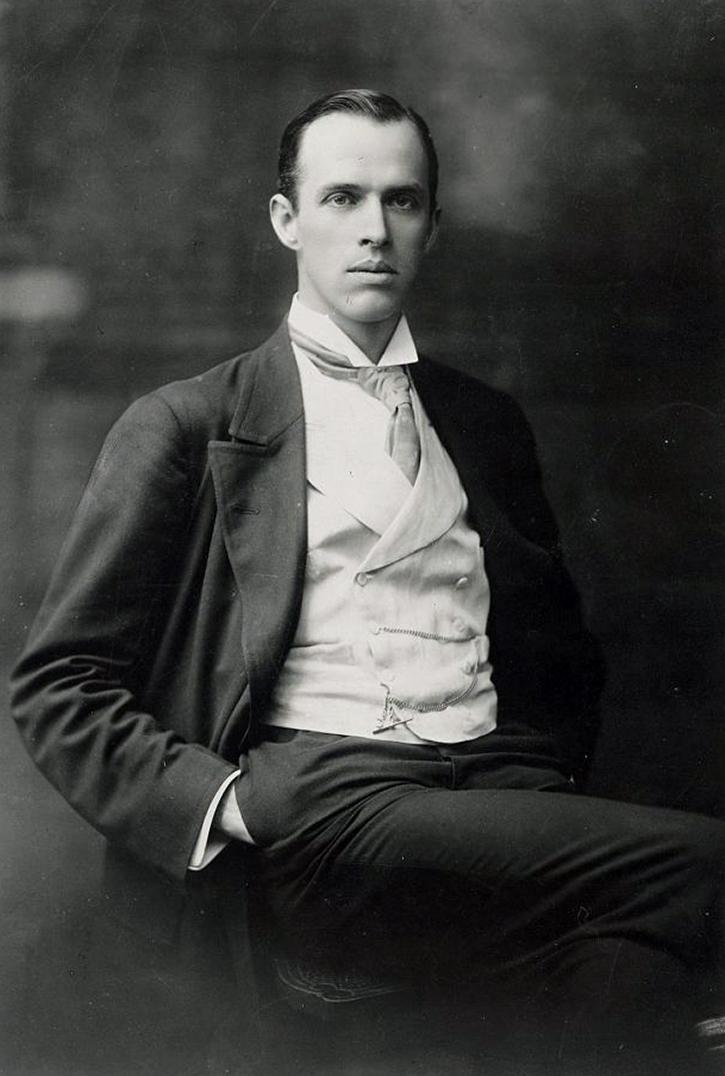
- Walling in 1906

Chair of the National Association for the Advancement of Colored People
- In office 1910–1911
- Preceded by: Position established
- Succeeded by: Oswald Garrison Villard

Personal details
- Born: William English Walling; March 18, 1877 Louisville, Kentucky, U.S.
- Died: September 12, 1936 (aged 59) Amsterdam, Netherlands
- Resting place: Crown Hill Cemetery and Arborteum; 39.8195472°N 86.1730912°W
- Education: University of Chicago (BA); Harvard University (LLB)

William English Walling (March 18, 1877 – September 12, 1936) (known as "English" to friends and family) was an American labor reformer and Socialist Republican born into a wealthy family in Louisville, Kentucky. He founded the National Women's Trade Union League in 1903. Moved by his investigation of the Springfield Race Riot of 1908 in the state capital of Illinois, he was among the co-founders of the National Association for the Advancement of Colored People (NAACP) in 1909.

He wrote three books on socialism in the early 20th century. He left the Socialist Party because of its anti-war policy, as he believed United States participation in the Great War was needed to defeat the Central Powers.

== Early life and education ==
William English Walling was born into wealth in Louisville, Kentucky, the son of Willoughby Walling, a physician who had inherited much real estate, and Rosalinda (née English) Walling. He had an older brother, Willoughby George Walling. His father's family were planters who had held slaves before the American Civil War. The boys' maternal grandfather was William Hayden English, a successful businessman in Indiana and the Democratic nominee for vice president in 1880.

Walling was educated at a private school in Louisville, and at the University of Chicago and Harvard Law School. After his grandfather English died while Walling was in college, the young man inherited a private income. He became a socialist. After moving to New York in 1900, he became active in state social movements and politics.

== Career ==
Walling became involved in labor and political movements, first working at Hull House in Chicago, an early settlement house and University Settlement Society of New York. He vowed to live on the equivalent of a worker's wage. Moving to New York City in 1900, Walling worked as a factory inspector. In 1903, he founded the National Women's Trade Union League.

In 1906, following a lengthy trip to Russia to report on the abortive Russian Revolution of 1905, he married Anna Strunsky, a Jewish immigrant and an aspiring novelist from San Francisco, who had lived as a child with her family on New York's Lower East Side before they moved to California. They had four children together: Rosamond, Anna, Georgia and Hayden.

In 1908, Walling published Russia's Message, a book inspired by the social unrest that he and his wife had observed in Russia. He joined the Socialist Party (1910–17), but resigned several years later at the time of the Great War because of its anti-war stance. Walling became convinced that United States intervention in the war was needed to defeat the Central Powers. His marriage to Anna Strunsky ended at this time, in part due to their disagreement over the United States' role in the conflict.

In 1908, Walling and his wife Anna went to Springfield, Illinois, to investigate a race riot that occurred on August 14. Ethnic whites had attacked blacks, with physical conflict arising out of job competition at the lowest levels and rapid social change in the developing city. Walling wrote an article, "The Race War in the North", for the September 3 issue of The Independent (New York), in which he said that "the spirit of the abolitionists, of Lincoln and Lovejoy, must be revived and we must come to treat the negro on a plane of absolute political and capitalist equality, or Vardaman and Tillman will soon have transferred the race war to the North." He appealed for a "large and powerful body of citizens to come to their aid."

Mary White Ovington wrote to him in support. She was one among a number of people, white and black, Christians and Jews, who were moved to create a new organization to work for civil rights. Walling was among the white founders of the NAACP; founding black members included such leaders as W.E.B. Du Bois from the Niagara Movement; founding Jewish members included such leaders as Henry Moskowitz, Joel and Arthur Spingarn, Lillian Wald, Walter E. Sachs, and others. They had some of their first meetings in Walling's New York apartment. Walling served initially as chairman of the NAACP Executive Committee (1910–1911).

Walling later worked full-time for the American Federation of Labor.

== Works ==
=== Books ===
- Russia's Message: The People Against the Czar (1908)
- Socialism As It Is – A Survey of The World-Wide Revolutionary Movement (1912/1918)
- The Larger Aspects of Socialism (1913)
- Progressivism and After (1914)
- The Socialists and the War (1915)
- Sovietism: The ABC of Russian Bolshevism—According to the Bolshevists (1920)

=== Selected articles ===
- "The New Unionism—The Problem of the Unskilled Worker". The Annals of the American Academy of Political and Social Science. 24: 12–31. September 1904. JSTOR 1010084.
- "Fifteen Reasons Why a 'Labor Party' Is Undesirable" (PDF). International Socialist Review. Vol. X, no. 7. January 1910. pp. 607–08.
- "Industrialism or Revolutionary Unionism" (PDF). The New Review. Vol. 1, no. 2. January 1913. pp. 45–51.
