= Lippisch DM-1 =

German single-seat research glider, 1944

DM-1
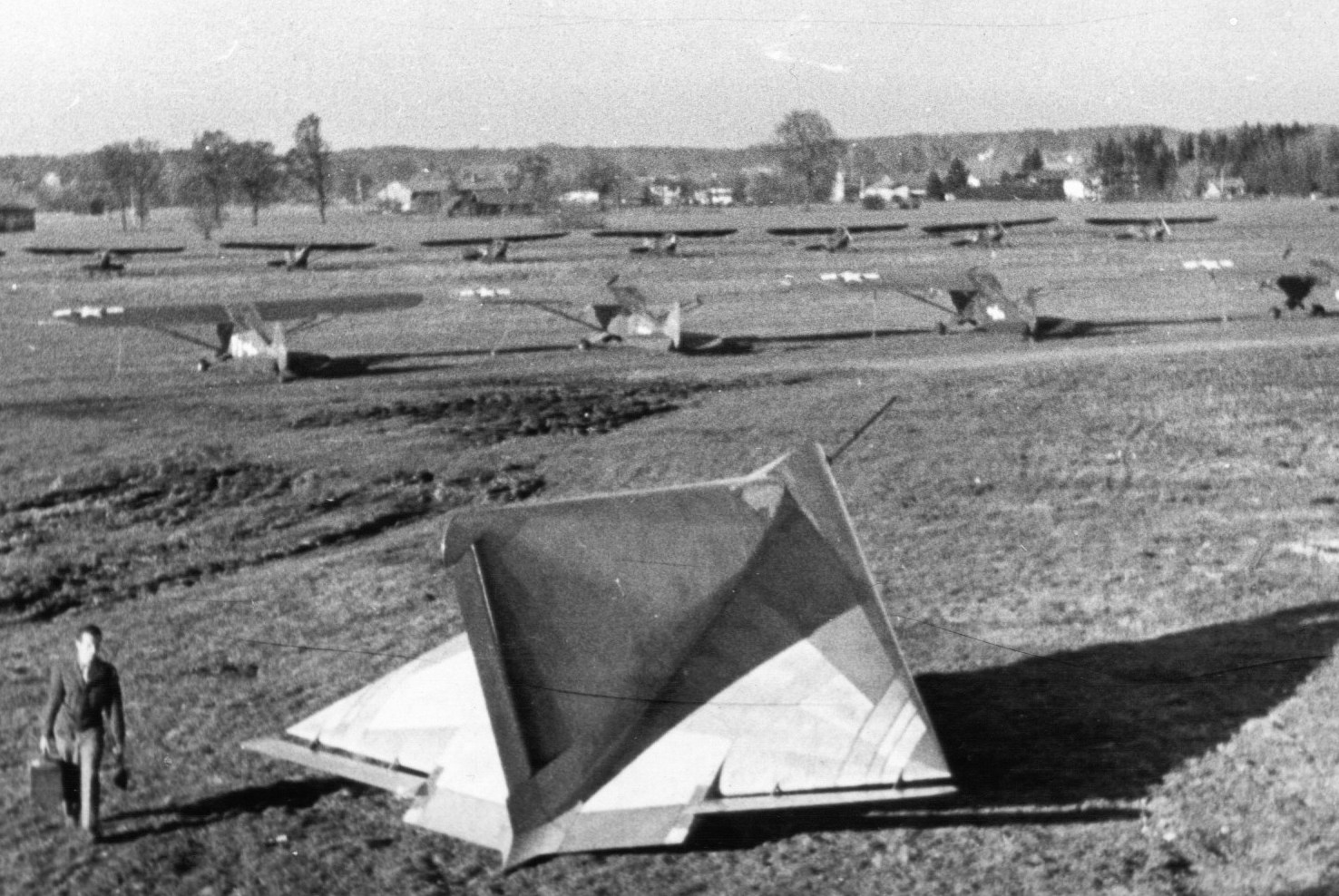
- The DM-1 at Munich Prien airport after the war

General information
- Type: Full-scale research glider
- National origin: Germany
- Manufacturer: Akaflieg Darmstadt & Akaflieg München
- Designer: Alexander Lippisch
- Number built: 1

History
- First flight: Not flown
- Developed into: Lippisch P.13a

The Lippisch DM-1 is a single-seat research glider that was designed and built in Germany from 1944.

== Development ==
During World War II, Dr. Alexander Lippisch proposed a ramjet propelled point defense fighter, the Lippisch P.12/13a. It was a sharply-swept delta flying wing with the engine buried in a thick, blunt-nosed wing. The pilot was accommodated in the forward section of the tail fin, which was as thick as the wings and almost as large. A scale model of the P.12/13a was successfully flown at Spitzerberg, near Vienna.

Lippisch himself lost interest in the design and began work on the P.13b with a different wing, but he was approached by students of Akaflieg Darmstadt and Akaflieg München, who asked for vital war work so that they would not be drafted. By this time in 1944 Lippisch realised that the war was hopeless and was happy to oblige, arranging for them to build a full-scale aerodynamic test glider for the P.12/13a project.

Construction began at the workshop of the Akaflieg Darmstadt, as the Darmstadt D-33. The workshop was bombed in September 1944, so the part-built airframe was moved to the Akaflieg München workshops at Prien am Chiemsee, where it was redesignated the DM-1 (for Darmstadt-München 1). At Prien, Wolfgang Heinemann and Hans Zacher from Darmstadt, with Klaus Metzner and Hermann Nenninger from Munich, continued the work.

The DM-1 was a single-seat glider made from steel tubing, plywood and bakelite impregnated plywood. The cockpit canopy was integrated into the fin leading edge. Launching the DM-1 was to be by piggy-back or aero-tow.

After occupation by U.S. troops in May 1945, work continued at the DM-1 on behalf of the U.S. military government, with General Patton and Charles Lindbergh visiting Prien to see the project. Completed in early November 1945, the DM-1 was shipped in a wooden box to Langley Field in Virginia where the flow behaviour of the DM-1 was examined in the NACA (National Advisory Committee for Aeronautics, forerunner of today's NASA) full-size wind tunnel.

== US modification ==
=== Vortex lift ===
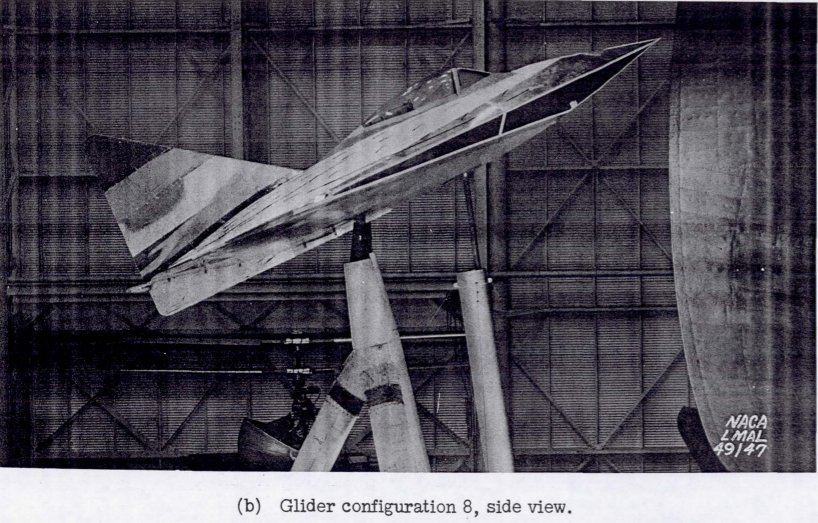
The DM-1 modified for wind tunnel testing by NACA.

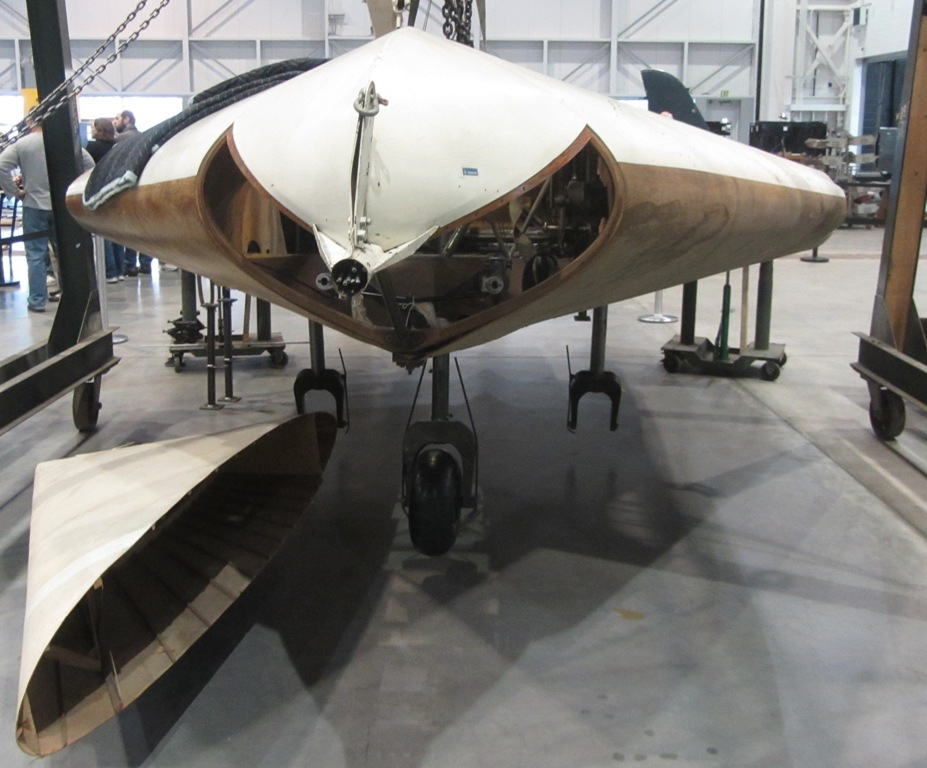
Lippisch DM-1 in restoration at the Smithsonian

When tested at Langley, the DM-1 was found to perform poorly. It generated significantly less lift at low speeds than small-scale models had suggested. The cause proved to be vortex lift generated by the models which, due to its much higher Reynolds number, the full-size aircraft did not produce.

As a consequence it underwent a programme of modifications. Like all Lippisch deltas it had a thick wing with a blunt leading edge. A strip was fixed along the leading edge to simulate a sharp profile. This created the vortices seen on the model and greatly increased the lift. The origin of modern vortex lift theory (as seen most famously on Concorde) may thus be traced to the NACA study and the modified DM-1.

=== Drag reduction ===
The large and even thicker vertical stabilizer was removed and replaced with one of much smaller size, along with a cockpit canopy from a Lockheed P-80 Shooting Star in a more conventional position. Together with improvements to the elevon hinges, this significantly reduced overall drag.

=== Preservation and restoration ===
After completion of testing the DM-1 was retired to the National Air and Space Museum, Smithsonian Institution in Washington, D.C. for storage at the Paul E. Garber Preservation, Restoration, and Storage Facility.

=== Controversy over its influence ===
It has been suggested that the DM-1 influenced design of the Convair delta-wing jets, beginning with the XF-92A. Convair engineers are known to have examined the DM-1 and interviewed Lippisch. This has led historians to assume his technical influence, however there is no direct evidence to support this assumption. On the contrary, Convair had independently discovered the thin delta wing, while the DM-1 had a thick wing and its aerodynamic behaviour is very different. They knew of Lippisch and at least one engineer met him, but his contribution was more in the nature of "moral support" than anything technical.

== Variants ==
Besides the NASA modifications, the Akafliege Darmstadt and München defined some powered designs for a development programme derived from the DM-1.

DM-1 (Lippisch). Glider as originally built but never flown, with thick wings and large tail.

(NACA). Glider as modified with leading-edge strip, small thin fin, conventional cockpit and sealed elevon hinges.

DM-2. Larger, supersonic test plane with 8.5 metres (27 ft 11 in) span, 8.94 metres (29 ft 4 in) length and prone pilot. Powered by a Walther liquid-fuelled rocket. All-up weight 11,500 kilograms (25,400 lb).
DM-3. Developed version of the DM-3 with pressure cabin and more powerful Walther C engine.
DM-4. Engine flight testbed, initially fitted with a Walther C. Airframe weight (without engine) 2,500 kilograms (5,500 lb)

== Specifications (DM-1) ==
Data from DM1 bis DM4

General characteristics

- Crew: 1
- Length: 6.32 m (20 ft 9 in)
- Wingspan: 6 m (19 ft 8 in)
- Height: 3.25 m (10 ft 8 in)
- Wing area: 19 m^{2} (200 sq ft) ca
- Empty weight: 375 kg (827 lb)
- Gross weight: 460 kg (1,014 lb)

Performance

- Maximum speed: 558 km/h (347 mph, 301 kn) Max speed in terminal velocity dive
- Stall speed: 72 km/h (45 mph, 39 kn)
- Maximum glide ratio: 7

== See also ==
Related development

- Lippisch P.13a
- Lippisch P.13b

Aircraft of comparable role, configuration, and era

- Convair XP-92
- Payen Pa 49
- Handley Page HP.115
