= Bertil Dillner =

Swedish-American aeronautical engineer

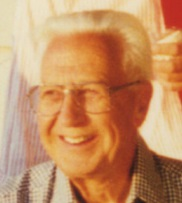
- Bertil Dillner. Photo about 1995.
- Born: 12 May 1923; Lit Jämtland, Sweden
- Died: 9 May 2015 (aged 91); Linköping, Sweden
- Citizenship: Sweden, United States
- Education: Master of Science in Aeronautical Engineering at KTH Royal Institute of Technology, Stockholm Sweden 1949
- Occupation: Aircraft design / manager aircraft design offices
- Known for: Expert Delta wing Aerodynamics; Saab 35 Draken; Saab 37 Viggen; Boeing 2707 SST; Space Shuttle
- Spouse: Brita Dillner
- Children: Eva Dillner; Anders Dillner

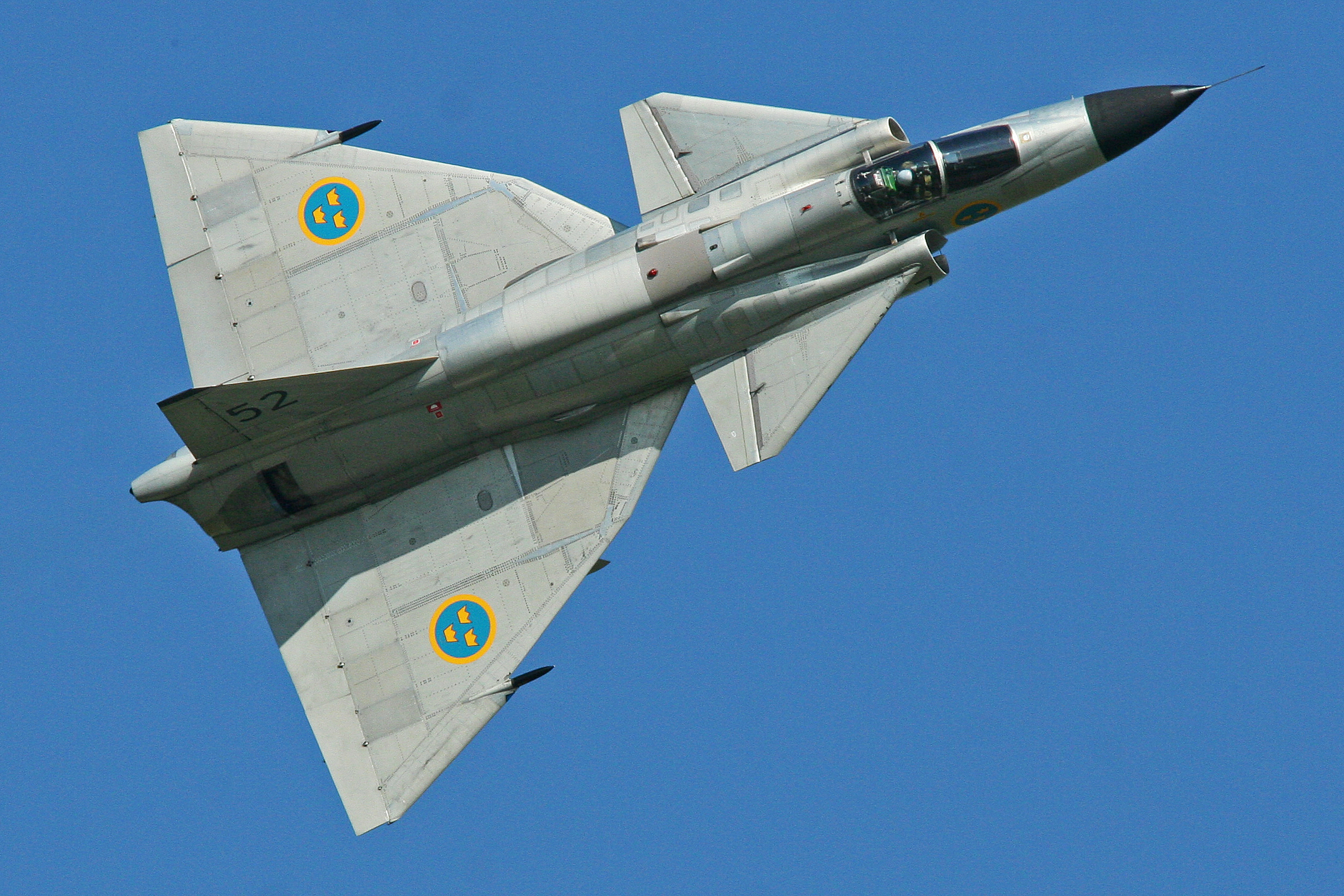
Saab 37 Viggen

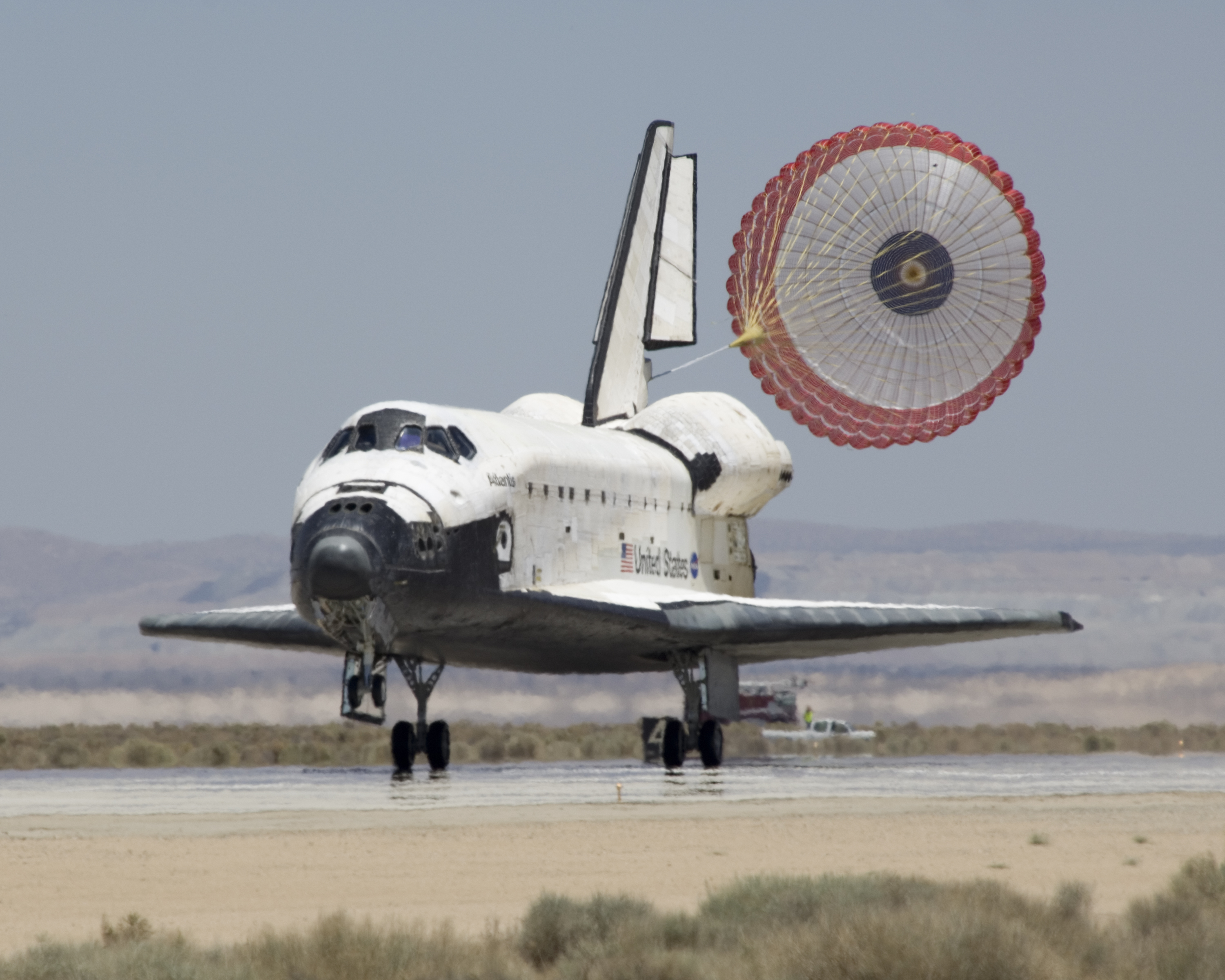
Space Shuttle in atmospheric flight has taken ground and the brake parachute has fallen out

Bertil Dillner (12 May 1923 in Lit Jämtland, Sweden – 9 May 2015 in Linköping) was a Swedish-American aeronautical engineer and aerodynamic expert. He was significant in the development of delta wing aerodynamics and supersonic flight concepts. Dillner served for many years as manager of Boeing engineering design offices.

== Biography ==
=== FFA ===
After graduation 1949, as Master of Science engineer in aeronautics at KTH Royal Institute of Technology, Stockholm Sweden he worked at the FFA, the Swedish National Aeronautical Research Institute.

=== Saab ===
From 1954 to 1967 at Saab AB, he participated in the aerodynamic core of the projects for Saab 35 Draken and Saab 37 Viggen, both cutting-edge technology during the Cold War and the Nuclear arms race. He worked under Erik Bratt and Tore Gullstrand, in the Saab design team with Hermann Behrbohm, Olof Ljungström and Einar Bergström.

In the shadow of the Cold War and the nuclear arms race the client, the Swedish Air Force's desire in the 1950s to the 1970s (the Defence Act of 1958) was to be able to swiftly attack strategic nuclear weapons-bombers such as Tupolev Tu-16 before they reached their targets. This with really fast supersonic-delta wing-fighter aircraft such as Saab 35 Draken, where speed and preparedness were the key factors. The Swedish Air Force's need were also landing operation-defenses over the surrounding seas with attack aircraft as well as ultra-fast reconnaissance aircraft planes such as the Saab 37 Viggen. Economy and materials engineering for friction heat of the atmosphere set the limit for speed. This generated large orders to build a very large air force and resources for development.

Dillner and Hermann Behrbohm made significant efforts in the design of Saab 37 Viggen, and in particular the design and tests of the canard-wing construction.

=== Boeing ===
From 1967 to 1981, Dillner was employed by Boeing Commercial Airplanes in Seattle, US to work with the supersonic Boeing 2707 SST passenger jet 1967–1972.

At Boeing he also become involved with the aerodynamics of the extreme supersonic aviation at the re-entry of Space Shuttle 1971-1972 and Boeing Preliminary Design Group and ex QSRA transporter studies.

Dillner was aerodynamic chief engineer at Boeing Commercial Airplanes 1972–1981. He also became an American citizen while in Seattle.

From 1981 to 1988, Dillner was employed by Boeing Defense, Space & Security in Seattle as aerodynamic chief engineer 1981-1985 and chief engineer 1985-1988 until his retirement. After retirement, he made some consulting assignments were made for Aermacchi and Saab 2000.

== Compound life ==
He was active in the American Institute of Aeronautics and Astronautics and co-founder of their Aerodynamic Committee.

Bertil Dillner chaired the Swedish Club North West between 1996 and 1997 and returned to Linköping and Sweden in 2005.

== See also ==
- List of aviators
- Delta wing
- Supersonic flight
- Saab 32 Lansen
- Saab 35 Draken
- Saab 105
- Saab 37 Viggen
- Boeing 2707
