= Erik Bratt =

Swedish civil engineer and pilot

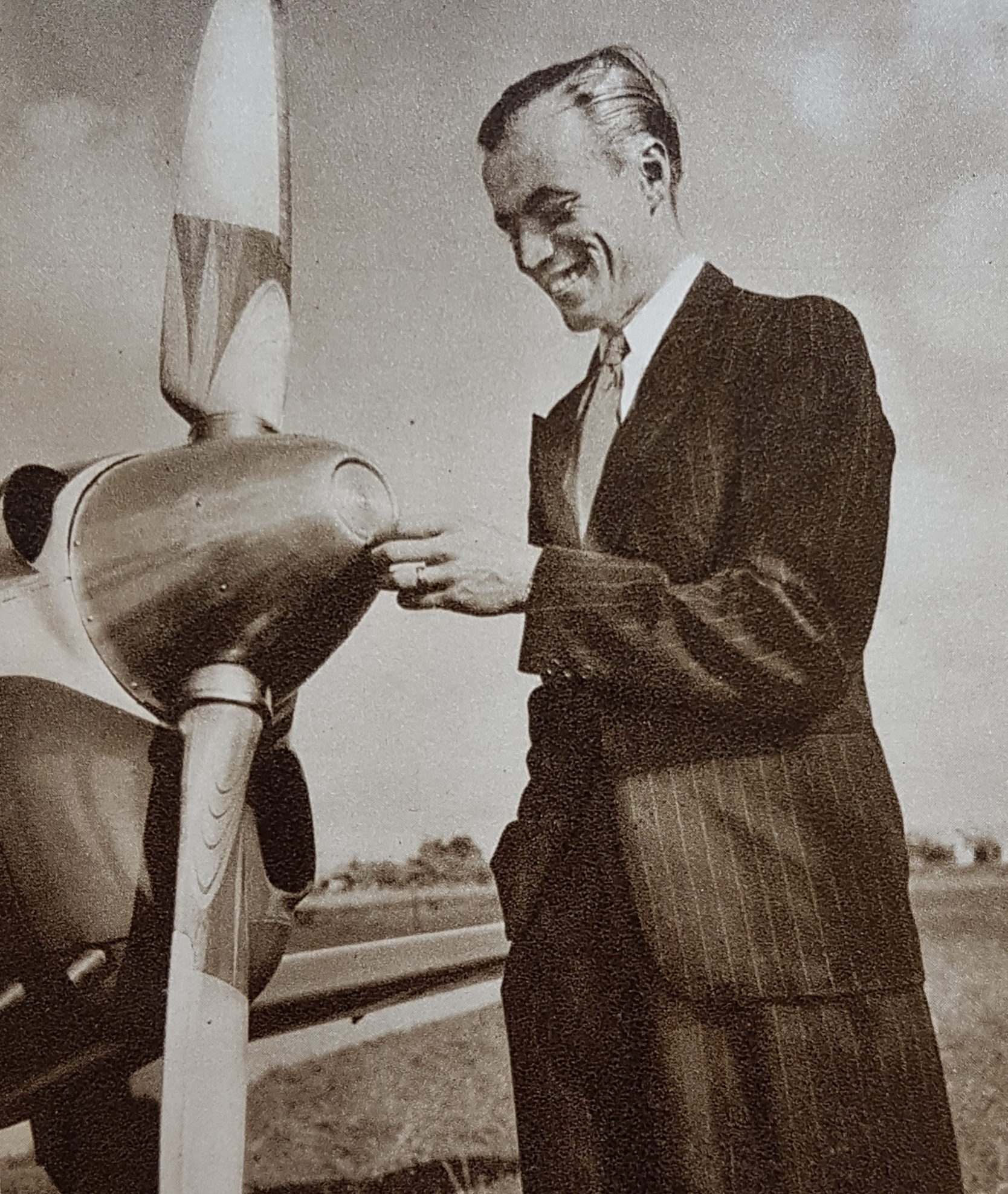
Erik Bratt demonstrates his Dynamicpropeller.

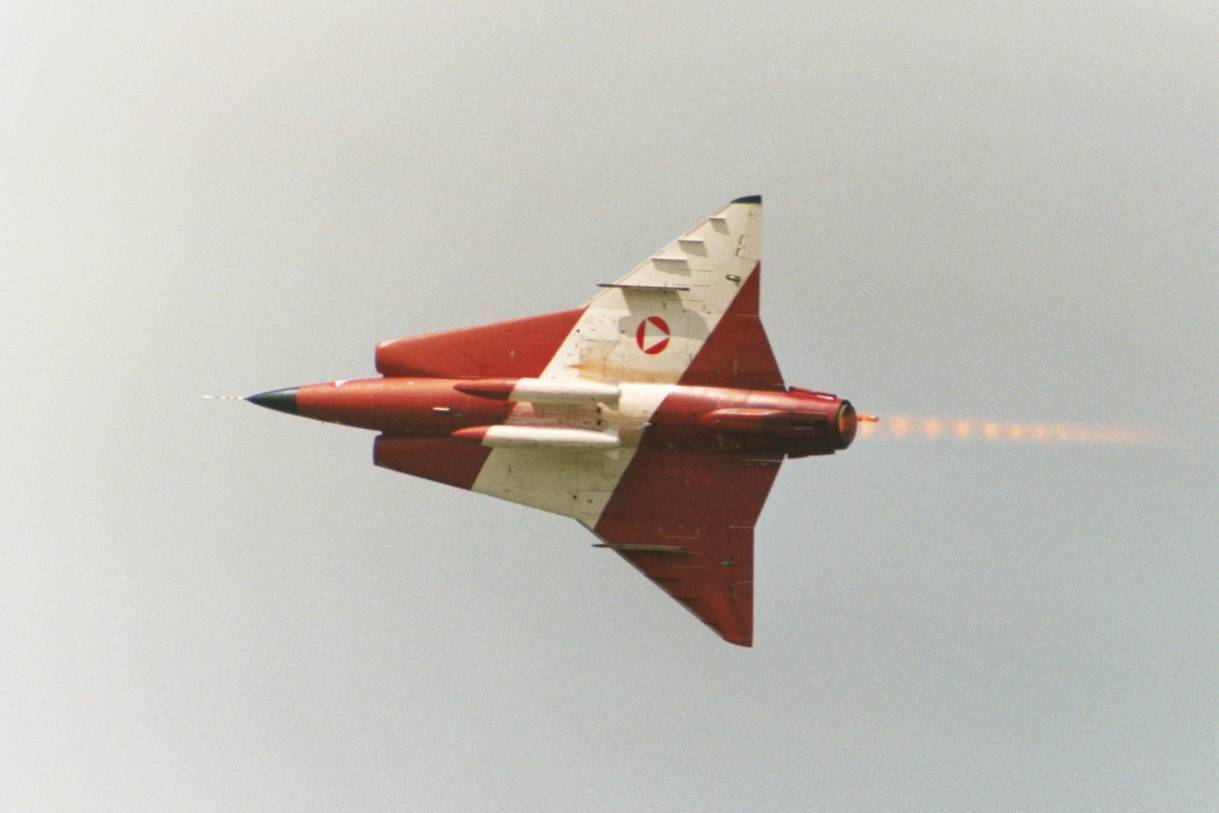
Saab 35 Draken

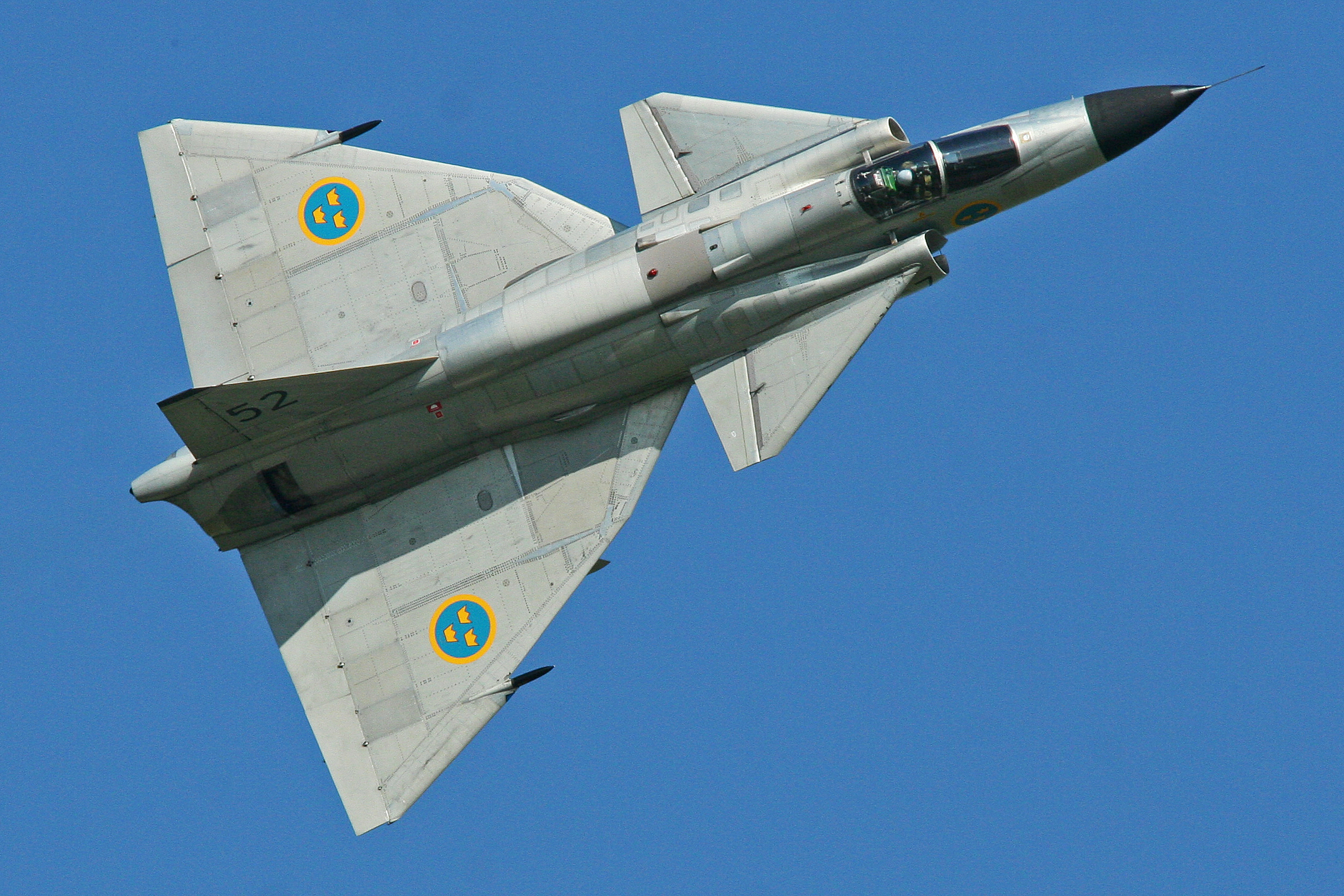
Saab 37 Viggen

Erik Gustaf Bratt (1 January 1916 – 13 February 2010) was a Swedish engineer and pilot. Erik Bratt was the brother of Colonel Lars Bratt.

== Biography ==
=== Education ===
Bratt earned his flight certificate in 1937 and underwent flight training in the Swedish Air Force from 1940 to 1942. He graduated in 1942 with a master's degree in engineering from the Royal Institute of Technology. He was employed at Skandinaviska Aero (later a part of Scandinavian Airlines) from 1942 to 1945. From 1945 until his retirement in 1981 he worked at Saab AB. In 1962, he became chief engineer; in 1964, he became the head of the design department for aircraft; and in 1974 director.

=== Saab 35 Draken and Saab 37 Viggen ===
Erik Bratt was responsible for the construction of Saab 35 Draken and Saab 37 Viggen by Saab AB, Linköping, Sweden. Bratt personified, in Sweden, the concept of the development and vast expansion of the Swedish Air Force in the shadow of the Cold War and the nuclear arms race.

At Saab AB, Bratt was the leader of the construction team of Bertil Dillner, Hermann Behrbohm, Einar Bergström and Olof Ljungström. The project included, as key parts, the development of supersonic flight and the delta wing concept.

- From the 1950s to the 1970s, the client, the Swedish Air Force⁣⁣, desired (the Defence Act of 1958) a swift attack with strategic nuclear weapons-bombers such as Tupolev Tu-16, before they reached their targets. This is with fast supersonic-delta wing-fighter aircraft such as Saab 35 Draken, where speed and preparedness were the key factors.
- The Swedish Air Force also needed landing operation-defenses over the surrounding seas with attack aircraft and ultra-fast reconnaissance aircraft planes such as the Saab 37 Viggen.
- Economy and materials engineering for friction heat of the atmosphere set the limit for speed. This generated large orders to build a very large air force and resources for development.

=== Awards ===
Bratt was awarded the Swedish Aeronautical Society's Thulin Medal in gold in 1972.

He was promoted in 1984 to technology honorary doctor at Linköping University and was awarded the 1986 Söderberg plaque. In 2002, he was appointed an honorary member of the Swedish Aviation History Association (Svensk Flyghistorisk Förening).

His autobiography is called Silvervingar (Silver wings); Bratt was a reserve pilot at the Swedish Air Force and received Silvervingar.)

== See also ==
- Delta wing
- Supersonic flight
- Saab 32 Lansen
- Saab 35 Draken
- Saab 105
- Saab 37 Viggen
- Tore Gullstrand
