= Hermann Behrbohm =

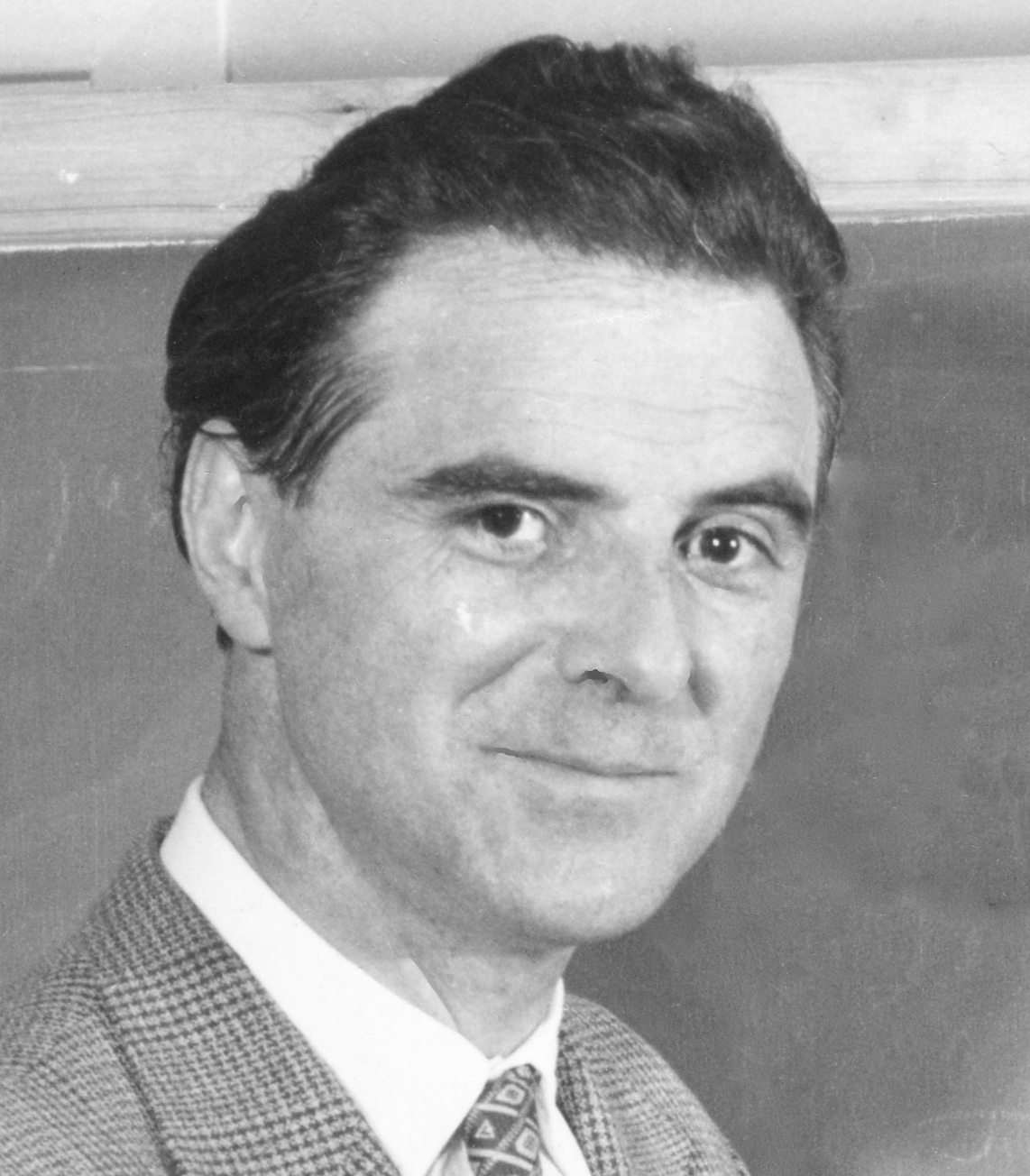
- Hermann Behrbohm. Photo about 1955.
- Born: 30 October 1907; German Empire Karlsruhe Grand Duchy of Baden
- Died: October 12, 1977 (aged 69); United Kingdom Fingelsham Northbourne Kent England
- Education: Georg-August-Universität Göttingen Mathematics (PhD, 1944)
- Occupation: Aircraft design / construction
- Known for: Expert in Aerodynamics and Strength in fighter aircraft Messerschmitt Bf 109; Messerschmitt Me 262; Messerschmitt Me 163; Lippisch P.13a; Saab 32 Lansen; Saab 35 Draken; Saab 105; Saab 37 Viggen
- Title: PhD
- Spouse(s): 1940–1964 Lilli Walter (divorced), 5 children 1964–1977 Pamela Leach (his death), 1 child
- Awards: Swedish Aeronautical Society's Thulin Medal (1968)

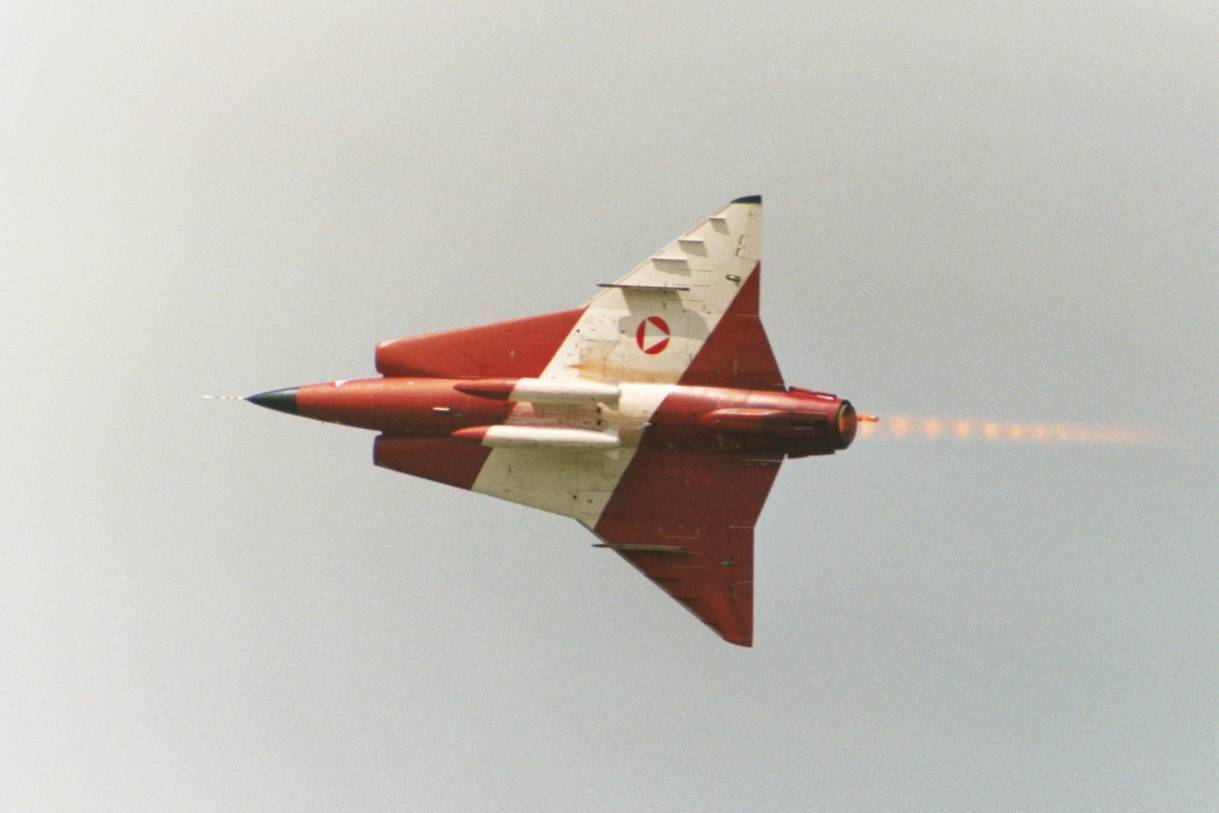
Saab 35 Draken

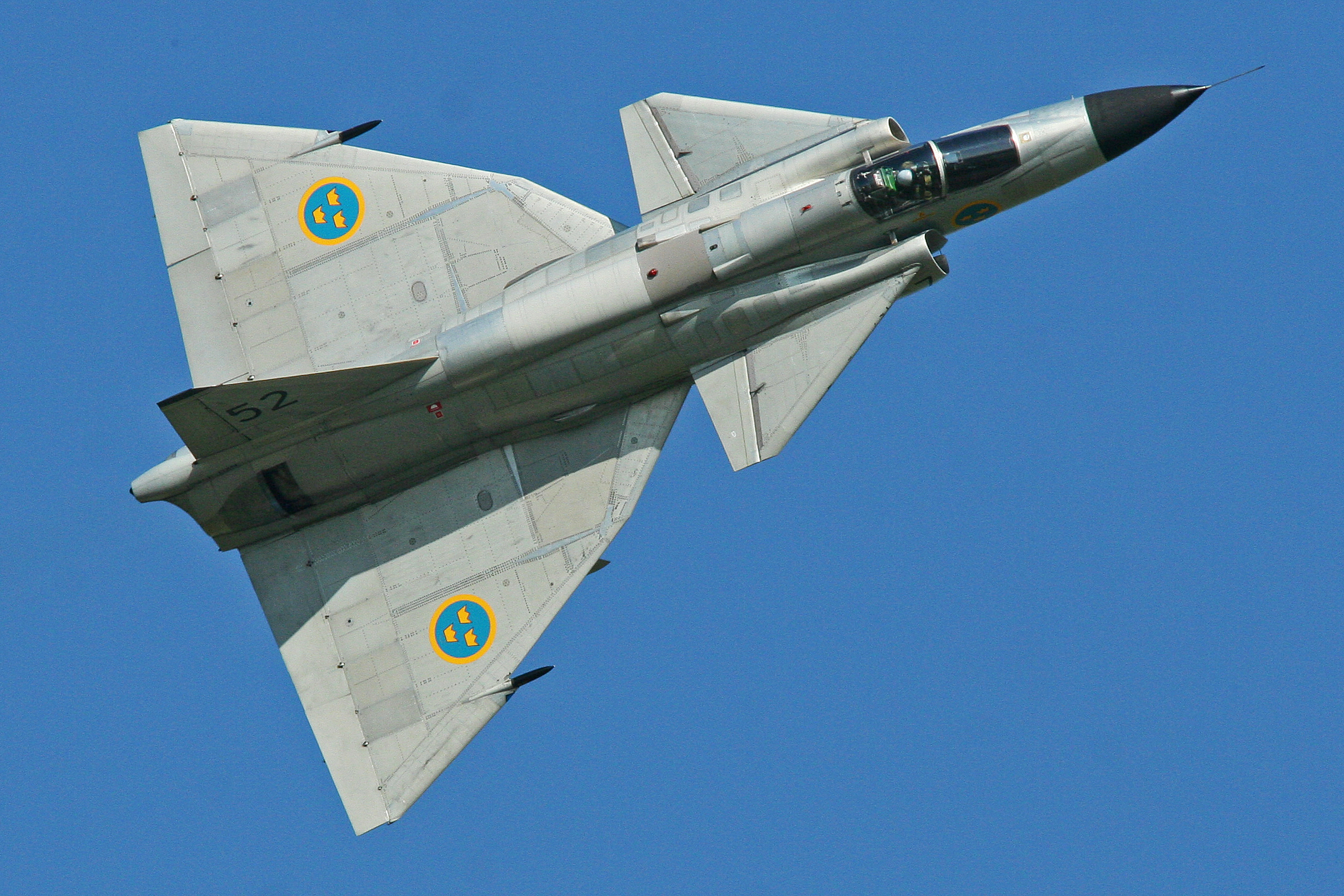
Saab 37 Viggen

Otto Hermann Bernhard Behrbohm, born 30 October 1907 in Karlsruhe, Grand Duchy of Baden, Imperial Germany; died 12 October 1977 in Fingelsham, Northbourne, Kent, United Kingdom, was a German mathematician active in Sweden and Germany.

He was significant in the mathematics behind the development of the aerodynamics of the delta wing concept and the technology of supersonic flight.

== Biography ==
Hermann Behrbohm was significant in the design of Saab 35 Draken and Saab 37 Viggen. He made the calculations supporting Alexander Lippisch developing the Delta wing concept at the end of the war. He received the Swedish Aeronautical Society's Thulin Medal 1968 in silver for having promoted aviation technology with work.

He made efforts in aviation technology in several countries during his life, due to the circumstances. Finally, as a pensioner, 1972 he moved to England with his British wife. His children stayed in Sweden.

He authored many articles in aerodynamic and mathematical specialist press available on libraries and the Internet.

=== Education and doctoral dissertation in Germany ===
He studied mechanical engineering at the Technical University of Karlsruhe, as well as mathematics and number theory at Georg-August-Universität Göttingen.

Behrbohm was a research assistant at the Georg-August-Universität Göttingen in 1933–1936 and wrote his doctoral dissertation on the algebra identity of the meromorphisms of an elliptical function body. The thesis was not approved for political reasons when the supervisor was Jewish and Nazi Germany took over. In 1944 he was promoted doctor in mathematics and physics.

Behrbohm also had great difficulties in marrying his first wife because of the regulations in Nazi Germany. She had difficulties obtaining biological purity certificates (unknown father) and thus being able to marry him, which was possible only in 1940.

=== Messerschmitt ===
He was recruited in 1937 to Messerschmitt’s Aerodynamics department in Augsburg.

Herrman Behrbom was asked for as a mathematician in the aerospace industry to make theoretical calculations and then run tests to drive development projects forward.

==== Augsburg 1937-1944 ====
He participated in work on high-speed trials with Messerschmitt Bf 109 with Lukas Schmid.

At Messerschmitt in Augsburg, the main project during these years was otherwise the development of the jet aircraft Messerschmitt Me 262.

The development of the rocket plane Messerschmitt Me 163 under the direction of Alexander Lippisch also took place here from 1939.

==== Oberammergau 1944-1945 ====
After the air raids on Augsburg the 25 February 1944, the development activities were moved into the underground facility of the Oberbayerische Forschungsanstalt in Oberammergau. The family remains in Mering close to Augsburg.

Messerschmitt developed from the end of 1944 under Willy Messerschmitt's direction the jetplane Messerschmitt P.1101. It has a lot in common with Saab 29 Tunnan, which was created before Hermann's time in Saab, as well as for MiG-15 and F-86 Sabre.

==== Wiener Neustadt 1944-1945 ====
From autumn 1944, he worked half-time for the Aviation Research Institute Vienna (LFW) in Wiener Neustadt, where Alexander Lippisch had opened his own development office.

Until then, Lippisch had worked for Messerschmitt with the rocket plane Messerschmitt Me 163. He and Willy Messerschmitt disagreed about the design, in which Lippisch did not want the rear wing, drag and worse performance.

In Wiener Neustadt, Lippisch worked on the further development of the delta wing (rear wingless) mini - (coal jet) fighter aircraft Lippisch P.13a, which at the end of the war became part of the Volksjäger program. The Lippisch P.13a delta wing technology is the basis for Saab 35 Draken in its design, the development of which Hermann later participated in by Saab. So also for ex Dassault Mirage.

One can see Messerschmitt Me 163 and not the least Lippisch P.13a as the basis for all delta wing fighter aircraft that followed in the 1950s.

=== Occupation - BEE ===
After the war ended in 1945, Hermann was an unemployed father of a family with 4 children in Mering near Augsburg American zone of occupation. They had income from gifts from housed American officers, but he also worked a time in agriculture and forestry with nature payments for family food on the table.

In the spring of 1946 he was recruited by BEE (French Aerodynamic Research and Development Institute, today a part of Deutsch-Französisches Forschungsinstitut Saint-Louis) with operations in Emmendingen and Weil am Rhein in French occupation zone in Germany.

After the formation of the Federal Republic of Germany 1949 and the end of occupation, the opportunities were greater to find scientifically interesting work abroad and Behrbohm received offers from France and other countries.

=== Saab ===
Hermann chose 1951 to start working on Saab moving to Linköping with his family who became naturalized Swedes.

The motives for choosing to work for Saab were the projects Saab 32 Lansen and Saab 35 Draken under Erik Bratt and Tore Gullstrand. Being a specialist in aerodynamics is a narrow labor market with few employers in the world who have sufficient resources to create good results. Saab where they built up operations and Sweden's ambitions gave Hermann the opportunities.

In the shadow of the Cold War and the nuclear arms race the client, the Swedish Air Force's desire in the 1950s to the 1970s (the Defence Act of 1958) was to be able to swiftly attack strategic nuclear weapons-bombers such as Tupolev Tu-16 before they reached their targets. This with really fast supersonic-delta wing-fighter aircraft such as Saab 35 Draken, where speed and preparedness were the key factors. The Swedish Air Force's need were also landing operation-defenses over the surrounding seas with attack aircraft as well as ultra-fast reconnaissance aircraft planes such as the Saab 37 Viggen. Economy and materials engineering for friction heat of the atmosphere set the limit for speed. This generated large orders to build a very large air force and resources for development.

Hermann remained at Saab until his retirement in 1972. During the years 1960–64 he was head of the Aerodynamics department, also participated in the projects Saab 37 Viggen and Saab 105 and published a large number of articles in aerodynamics. He was esteemed and won the Swedish Aeronautical Society's Thulin Medal 1968 in silver.

Hermann Behrbohm and Bertil Dillner made significant efforts in the design of Saab 37 Viggen, and in particular the design and tests of the Canard-wing construction.

After retirement, he moved with his second wife to her hometown in the south of England and lived there afterwards.

== See also ==
- List of aviators
- Delta wing
- Supersonic flight
- Messerschmitt Bf 109
- Messerschmitt Me 262
- Messerschmitt Me 163
- Lippisch P.13a
- Saab 32 Lansen
- Saab 35 Draken
- Saab 105
- Saab 37 Viggen
