= Plejad-class torpedo boat =

Plejad-class torpedo boat may refer to:

- Plejad-class torpedo boat (1907), operated by the Swedish Navy during both World Wars
- Plejad-class torpedo boat (1953), operated by the Swedish Navy during most of the Cold War
