= Sten Luthander =

Swedish professor in aeronautics

Sten Åke Birger Luthander (December 8, 1905, in Silbodal in Värmland – February 13, 2000, at Lidingö) was a Swedish professor in aeronautics.

== Education and career ==
After studying at KTH Royal Institute of Technology 1925–1930, he was employed as an assistant to Ivar Malmer in aeronautical engineering (1930) and strength theory (1936) at KTH. He was head of department at the National Aeronautical Research Institute in 1940, and was appointed professor of aeronautical engineering at KTH in 1944. He was head of Saab AB's research department in Linköping 1947–1949. Retired from KTH 1972. In 1961 he started the consulting company LUTAB (Professor Sten Luthander Ingenjörsbyrå AB).

== Awards ==
In 1952 he was awarded the Swedish Aeronautical Society's Thulin Medal in gold.

== Membership ==
- Member of the Royal Swedish Academy of Engineering Sciences (IVA), 1956.

== Family ==
In his first marriage in 1940, Sten Luthander was married to the cellist Carin de Frumerie (1911–1974), who was the sister of Gunnar de Frumerie and later remarried Bellander. In his second marriage, he was married from 1960 until his death to Wiveca, born Hagenow. The daughter in the first marriage Eva Luthander (born 1944) is a pianist and has been employed as a senior lecturer at the Royal College of Music, Stockholm. Sten Luthander is buried in Lidingö Cemetery.
