= Tore Gullstrand =

Swedish business leader (1921–2002)

Tore Ragnar Gullstrand (16 August 1921 in Karlstad – 2002 in Linköping) was a Swedish business leader in the aviation industry and researcher in aeronautics. He was the son of Ragnar Gullstrand.

Gullstrand was chief engineer (the manager) by Saab AB, Linköping, Sweden, by the development and vast expansion of the Swedish Air Force (the Defence Act of 1958) and for the construction of Saab 35 Draken and Saab 37 Viggen in the shadow of the Cold War and the nuclear arms race.

Gullstrand became a engineer at the Royal Institute of Technology in 1945, licentiate in technology in 1950 and doctoral dissertation in 1952 for technology doctoral degree. He acted as acting director of professorship in aeronautical engineering 1947–1949 (when Sten Luthander worked as head of SAAB's research department) and became associate professor in 1953. He was employed in 1953 at Saab in Linköping where he in 1958 became chief engineer, 1962 director, 1965 head of the technical department, 1968 deputy managing director in Saab-Scania, 1969 head of the aviation division and 1983–1991 head of the central staff for research and technical development.

In 1954 he became flight engineer of the 1st degree in Swedish Air Force reserve.

He was elected in 1962 to the Royal Swedish Academy of Engineering Sciences (IVA), 1968 to the Royal Swedish Academy of War Sciences and in 1981 became a member of the Royal Swedish Academy of Sciences.

In 1965 he was awarded the Swedish Aeronautical Society's Thulin Medal in gold and in 1985 was awarded IVA's great gold medal "for his outstanding work in the Swedish aviation industry".

== See also ==
- Saab 32 Lansen
- Saab 35 Draken
- Saab 105
- Saab 37 Viggen
