= HSwMS Perseus =

Swedish torpedo boat

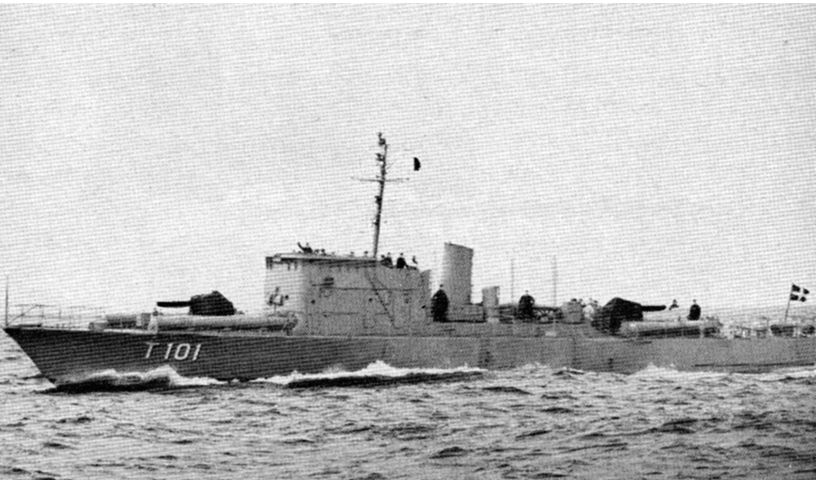
- HSwMS Perseus sometime before 1959

History

Sweden
- Name: Perseus
- Builder: Karlskrona Navy Yard
- Launched: 23 March 1950
- Commissioned: 1951
- Fate: Stricken 1 January 1967
- Badge

General characteristics
- Type: Torpedo boat
- Displacement: Standard: 145 tons; Full load: 170 tons
- Length: wl: 45.19 m (148 ft 3 in); oa: 48.01 m (157 ft 6 in)
- Beam: 5.87 m (19 ft 3 in)
- Draft: 1.60 m (5 ft 3 in)
- Installed power: 10,500 hp (7,800 kW)
- Speed: Top: 40 knots (74 km/h; 46 mph); Cruising: 30 knots (56 km/h; 35 mph)
- Complement: 33
- Armament: 4 × 533 mm (21.0 in) torpedo tubes; 4 × 103 mm (4.1 in) guns; 1 × twin 40 mm (1.6 in) gun; 12 × flare launchers

HSwMS Perseus (T 101) was an experimental torpedo boat operated by the Swedish Navy during the 1950s and 1960s. She was ordered as part of a new doctrine that emphasized a small coastal fleet compared to capital ships. The design featured four torpedo tubes along with several guns of various caliber and was equipped with diesel engines and a gas turbine that allowed for a top speed of 40 knots (74 km/h; 46 mph). The ship was commissioned in 1951 and used to develop the design into the subsequent Plejad-class torpedo boat (1953). After being rebuilt several times to test further designs, she was decommissioned in 1967.

== Development and design ==
In the early Cold War, the Swedish Navy was one of the most powerful in the Baltic Sea as other regional powers slowly rebuilt from World War II. By 1960, the numerical superiority was lost and a new approach was needed. In response, the Defense Act of 1958 introduced the concept of a "light navy". Compared to the old navy that was built around capital ships, the doctrine emphasized escorts to protect the Swedish coast, with large torpedo boats slated to both serve in task forces with destroyers and operate independently. An order for such vessels was placed in the early 1950s from Lürssen Werft, a German shipyard that specialized in E-boats during the war. Compared to contemporary torpedo boats, the design featured a much larger and robust hull, which allowed for more weapons and electronics on board.

Perseus was intended to serve as a prototype of this design. She featured a waterline length of 45.19 metres (148 ft 3 in), overall length of 48.01 metres (157 ft 6 in), beam of 5.87 metres (19 ft 3 in), and draught of 1.60 metres (5 ft 3 in). She was powered by two MTU V20 diesel engines and a gas turbine with a combined output of 10,500 horsepower (7,800 kW) and allowed for a top speed of 40 knots (74 km/h; 46 mph). At a cruising speed of 30 knots (56 km/h; 35 mph), she had a range of 600 nautical miles (1,100 km; 690 mi) and had a crew of 33. The ship was armed with four 533 mm (21.0 in) torpedo tubes, two single-barreled 40 mm (1.6 in) anti-aircraft guns, four 103 mm (4.1 in) and twelve 57 mm (2.2 in) illumination flare launchers. She displaced 145 tons at a standard load and 170 tons fully loaded.

She was built at the Karlskrona Navy Yard, was launched on 23 March 1950, and commissioned in 1951. She was used to prototype further torpedo boat designs, primarily the 11-ship strong Plejad class that entered service between 1954 and 1958. She was regularly rebuilt to test new designs, which included the fitting of significantly more powerful engines and the removal of her funnel. Soon after the Plejad-class ships were rebuilt, Perseus was decommissioned on 1 January 1967.
