= Defence Act (Sweden) =

Swedish Act of Parliament

A Defence Act (Swedish: Försvarsbeslut, literally Defence Decision) is an act passed by the Swedish Riksdag every four years which details how the Swedish Armed Forces will function and develop during the coming years.

Between 1901 and 1958, Acts were generally passed every ten years, with the exception of the Defence Act of 1942, which was passed earlier due to World War II. The Defence Act of 1968 introduced a system requiring Defence Acts to be passed every five years. The work revolving a new Defence Act starts off with all elements of the Swedish Total Defence drawing up plans on what structure and capacity the Defence will operate under during the coming 10 to 15 years. After discussions with the government, the defence authorities deliver a proposal to the cabinet detailing how the defence of Sweden can be developed. The government then drafts a proposition which is sent to the Riksdag, where it is eventually passed.

== History ==
Until the Defence Act of 1958, the Swedish Armed Forces had been steadily improving in quality and in numbers. A policy of gradual disarmament commenced as a result of the Defence Act of 1968, thus lowering the yearly conscripted manpower pool of 50,000 men and women to today's 5,000.

In December 1988, the Carlsson Cabinet decided on disbanding the sitting Defence Committee and replacing it with a new committee where members of all parties of the Riksdag would be present. The evaluation time was increased by 6 months, due to the poor handling of the Defence Inquiry of 1987. Since 1989, Defence Acts have been passed every four years until 2008, when the Reinfeldt Cabinet delayed the Defence Act of 2008 to the spring of 2009.

As of the Defence Act of 2004, the Swedish Armed Forces has abandoned the traditional doctrine of invasion defence and moved on to a doctrine of operational defence. The 2004 act also decided that the military was to establish the Nordic Battlegroup, consisting of troops from Estonia, Finland and Norway (and later, the Republic of Ireland was included). As of the Defence Act of 2009, conscription was suspended during times of peace and was replaced from 2011 by volunteer military training.

Conscription was reintroduced in 2017.
