= Plejad-class torpedo boat (1953) =

Swedish torpedo boat class

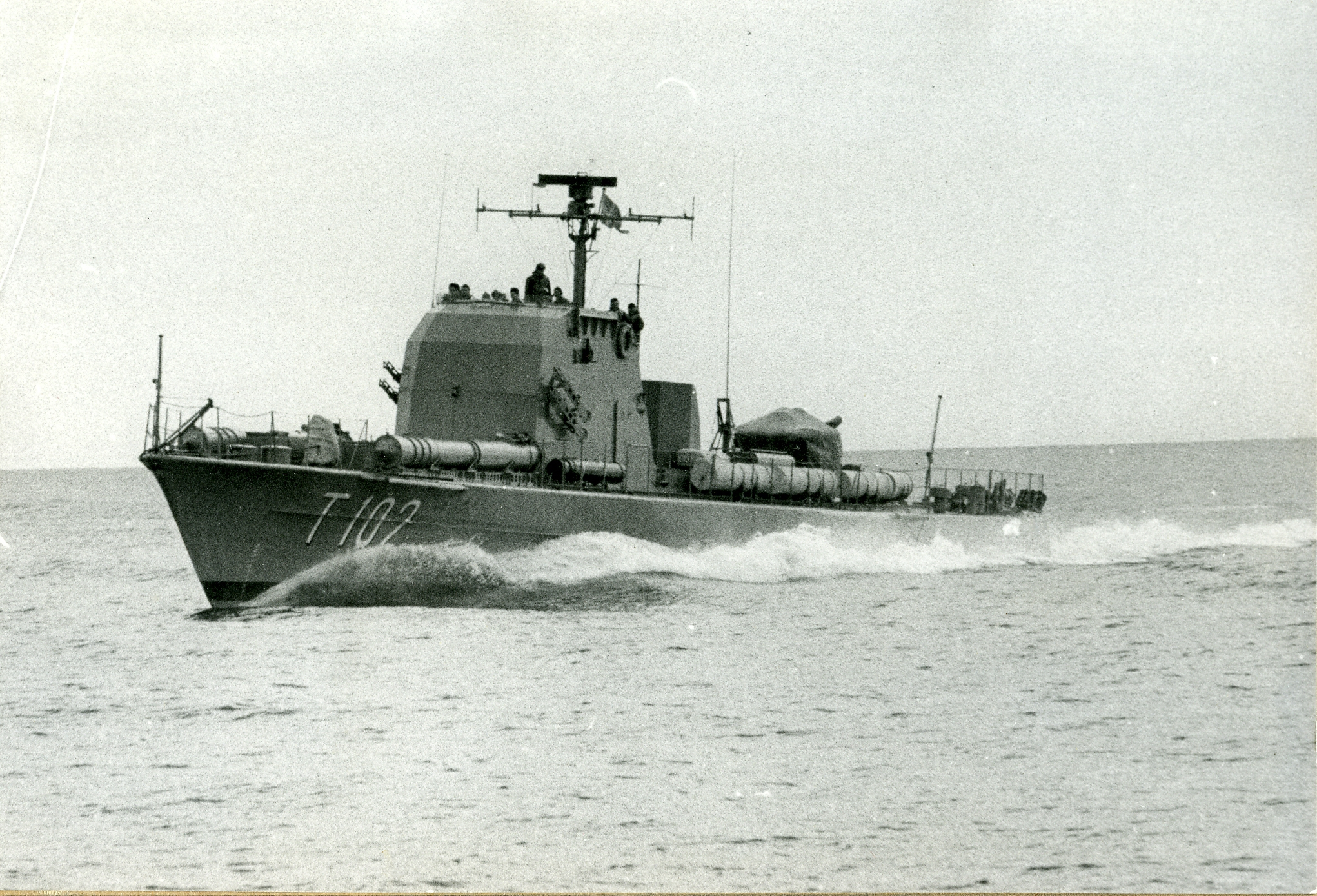
- HSwMS Plejad in 1955, underway at high speed

Class overview
- Name: Plejad class
- Builders: Karlskrona Navy Yard
- Operators: Swedish Navy
- Preceded by: HSwMS Perseus
- Succeeded by: Spica class
- Built: 1953–1958
- In service: 1954–1981
- Completed: 11

General characteristics
- Type: Torpedo boat
- Displacement: Standard: 155 tons; Full load: 170 tons
- Length: wl: 45.19 m (148 ft 3 in); oa: 48.01 m (157 ft 6 in)
- Beam: 5.87 m (19 ft 3 in)
- Draft: 1.60 m (5 ft 3 in)
- Installed power: 9,000 bhp (6,700 kW)
- Speed: Top: 37.5 knots (69.5 km/h; 43.2 mph); Cruising: 30 knots (56 km/h; 35 mph)
- Complement: 33
- Armament: 6 × 533 mm (21.0 in) torpedo tubes; 4 × 103 mm (4.1 in) guns; 1 × twin 40 mm (1.6 in) gun; 12 × flare launchers

The Plejad class was a series of large torpedo boats operated by the Swedish Navy during the Cold War. They were developed in the early 1950s as part of a new doctrine that emphasized a small coastal fleet compared to capital ships. The vessels were designed in Germany and built in Sweden and were large for their type. The design was well armed, incorporating five guns of various caliber and six torpedo tubes. Aside from the initial prototype Perseus, 11 vessels were built to the design. The last ship entered service in 1958 and was decommissioned in 1981.

== Development and design ==
In the early Cold War, the Swedish Navy was one of the most powerful in the Baltic Sea as other regional powers slowly rebuilt from World War II. By 1960, the numerical superiority was lost and a new approach was needed. In response, the Defense Act of 1958 introduced the concept of a "light navy". Compared to the old navy that was built around capital ships, the doctrine emphasized escorts to protect the Swedish coast, with large torpedo boats slated to both serve in task forces with destroyers and operate independently. An order for such vessels was placed in the early 1950s from Lürssen Werft, a German shipyard that specialized in E-boats during the war. Compared to contemporary torpedo boats, the design featured a much larger and robust hull, which allowed for more weapons and electronics onboard.

A prototype, Perseus, was laid down in 1950 and featured a standard displacement of 145 tons with two diesel engines, 4 torpedo tubes, a gas turbine, and was later rebuilt as a test bed for further torpedo boat designs. The class featured a waterline length of 45.19 metres (148 ft 3 in), overall length of 48.01 metres (157 ft 6 in), beam of 5.87 metres (19 ft 3 in), and draught of 1.60 metres (5 ft 3 in). They were powered by three MTU V20 diesel engines, which produced 9,000 brake horsepower (6,700 kW) and a top speed of 37.5 knots (69.5 km/h; 43.2 mph). At a cruising speed of 30 knots (56 km/h; 35 mph), the ships had a range of 600 nautical miles (1,100 km; 690 mi). They were armed with six 533 mm (21.0 in) torpedo tubes, two 40 mm (1.6 in) gun (two single mounts), and four 103 mm (4.1 in) and twelve 57 mm (2.2 in) illumination flare launchers. At a standard load, the vessels displaced 155 tons and 170 tons fully loaded. They were crewed by 33 sailors. If the torpedo tubes were removed, they could be fitted with minesweeping equipment.

Many features of the design was retained in the later Spica-class torpedo boats, with the main changes regarding improved fire control. The design was Lürssen Werft's first fast attack craft design since World War II, and it served as the basis for the Jaguar and Seeadler-class fast attack craft built for the West German Navy.

The vessels were built in two batches at the Karlskrona Navy Yard. The first batch of six were laid down between 1953 and 1954 were commissioned in either 1954 or 1955 while the second batch was laid down between 1956 or 1957 and entered service between 1956 and 1958. Most of the ships were stricken in 1977, but two, Aldebaran and Astrea, remained in service until 1981.

== Ships in class ==
Data
Name	Launched	Stricken	Hull number
Plejad	21 November 1953	1 July 1977	T 102
Polaris	18 January 1954	1 July 1977	T 103
Pollux	3 March 1954	1 July 1977	T 104
Regulus	15 April 1954	1 July 1977	T 105
Rigel	16 June 1954	1 July 1977	T 106
Aldebaran	16 August 1954	1 July 1981	T 107
Altair	24 May 1956	1 July 1977	T 108
Antares	14 August 1956	1 July 1977	T 109
Arcturus	5 November 1956	1 July 1977	T 110
Argo	18 January 1957	1 July 1977	T 111
Astrea	15 March 1957	1 July 1981	T 112
