= RB 04 =

RB-04E
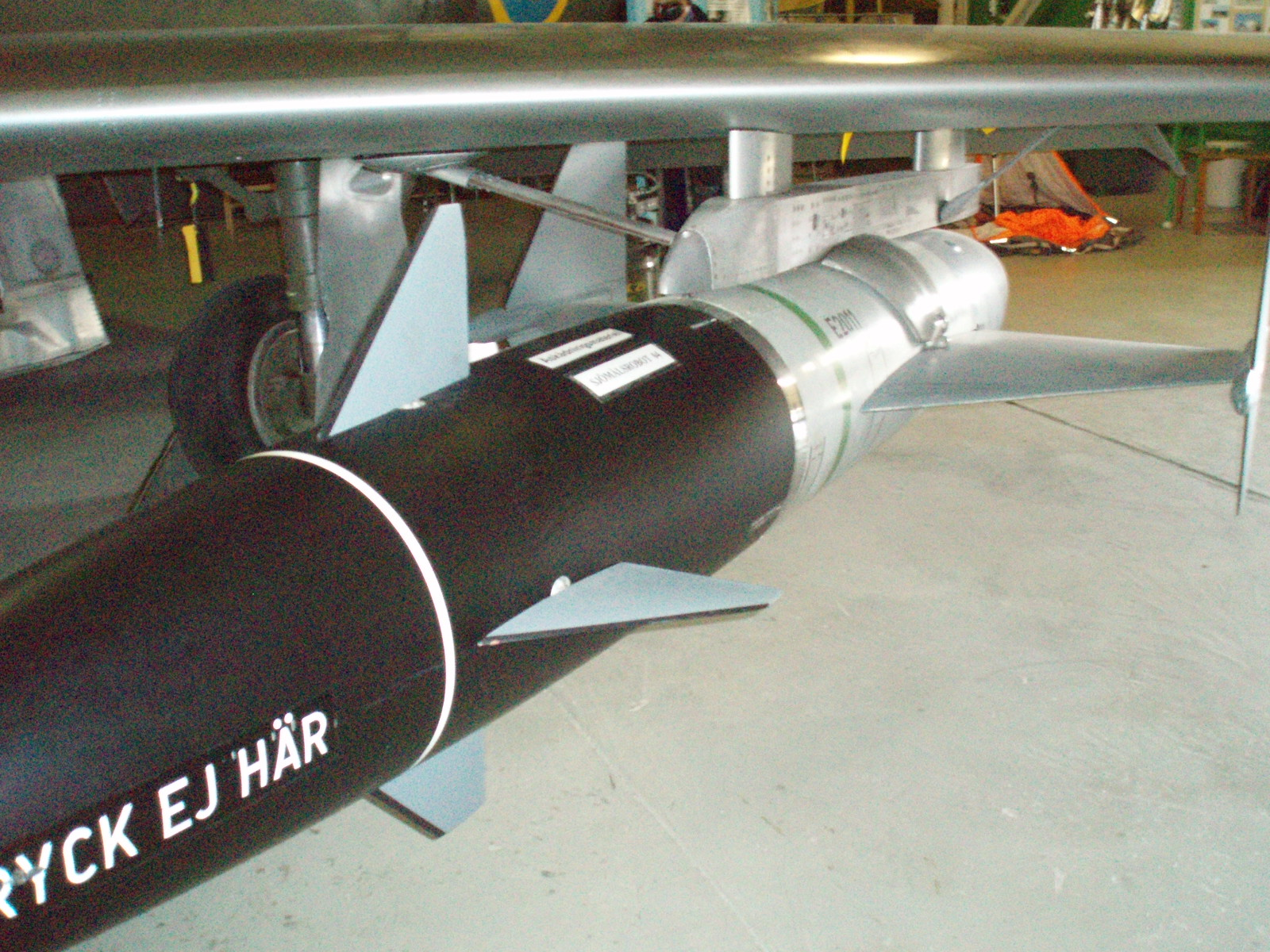
- Type: Fire and forget anti-ship missile
- Place of origin: Sweden

Service history
- In service: 1962–2000?
- Used by: Sweden

Production history
- Manufacturer: SAAB

Specifications
- Mass: 600 kg (1,300 lb)
- Length: 4.45 m (14 ft 7 in)
- Diameter: 50 cm (20 in)
- Wingspan: 2.04 m (6 ft 8 in)
- Warhead: 300 kg (660 lb) HE blast and pre-fragmented
- Detonation mechanism: impact or proximity
- Engine: INI Solid Rocket Engine
- Propellant: Solid
- Operational range: 32 km (20 mi)
- Flight altitude: sea skimming
- Maximum speed: subsonic
- Guidance system: active radar homing, Track on Jam (AGA-1 seeker, Rb04C)
- Launch platform: Aircraft A 32, AJ 37, AJS 37

The RB-04 (Robot 04) is a long-range sea skimming fire-and-forget air-to-surface, anti-ship missile. The missile was known as the "RB-304" during development and early service years.

== Development ==
While interest in guided anti-ship missiles was subdued in the 1950s, it was not entirely extinct. In 1949, the Swedish government placed a request for a radar-guided, air-launched anti-ship missile. The request materialized as the SAAB "Robot-Byrån (RB) 04", which was first test launched by a Saab 29 Tunnan fighter in early 1955. The early versions of the missile suffered teething problems in regards to the two targeting modes, which were area attack, for striking a big group of ships (like an invasion fleet), and select targeting, where the missiles home in on a single vessel. In the area attack mode, the missile would only target a ship in the group if they were within 1,000 meters of another vessel. This was also in the early electronic age, and changes in this distance required hardware modifications in a workshop.

Many components of the missile were reused when the RBS-15 was developed, including the main body and warhead, although the motor and main wings were the most obvious external changes.

== Variants ==
- RB-04C: The initial production version, the "RB-04C", entered service with Swedish Air Force A 32A Lansen attack aircraft in 1959. The RB-04C had a canard configuration, with short triangular cruciform fins around the nose, and two wide wings with fins attached to the wingtips. The RB-04C had a boost-sustain solid rocket motor and a SAP warhead that could be fitted with a contact or proximity fuse.
- RB-04D: Further development of the C version. Longer range rocket engines and maintenance free thermal batteries were the main improvements. Introduced in the late 1960s.
- RB-04E: Further development of the D version to suit the new AJ37 Viggen strike aircraft. The missile had a shorter wingspan and improved guidance system and new monopulse radar seeker. This version was highly resistant to ECM and would automatically lock on especially powerful jamming signals.

== Operational use ==
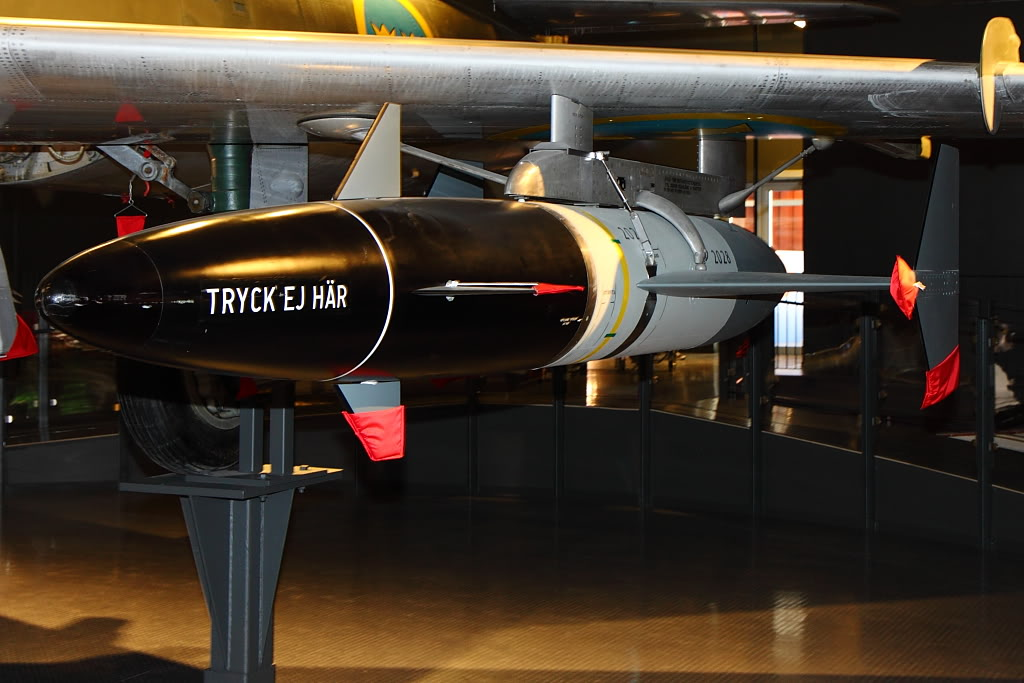
Robot 04 on A32A Lansen

The missile has never seen combat; the closest it has come to being used was during the "Whiskey on the Rocks" incident in 1981, when a Soviet (NATO code Whiskey Class) submarine ran aground outside the naval station in Karlskrona. Swedish AJ37 Viggens with RB-04E's mounted under their wings, taken from top secret storage bunkers, stood on high alert for a possible Soviet incursion. On one occasion, when a Soviet rescue operation seemed to be underway, aircraft were scrambled with the intent to intercept Soviet ships.
