= Plejad-class torpedo boat (1907) =

Swedish torpedo boat class

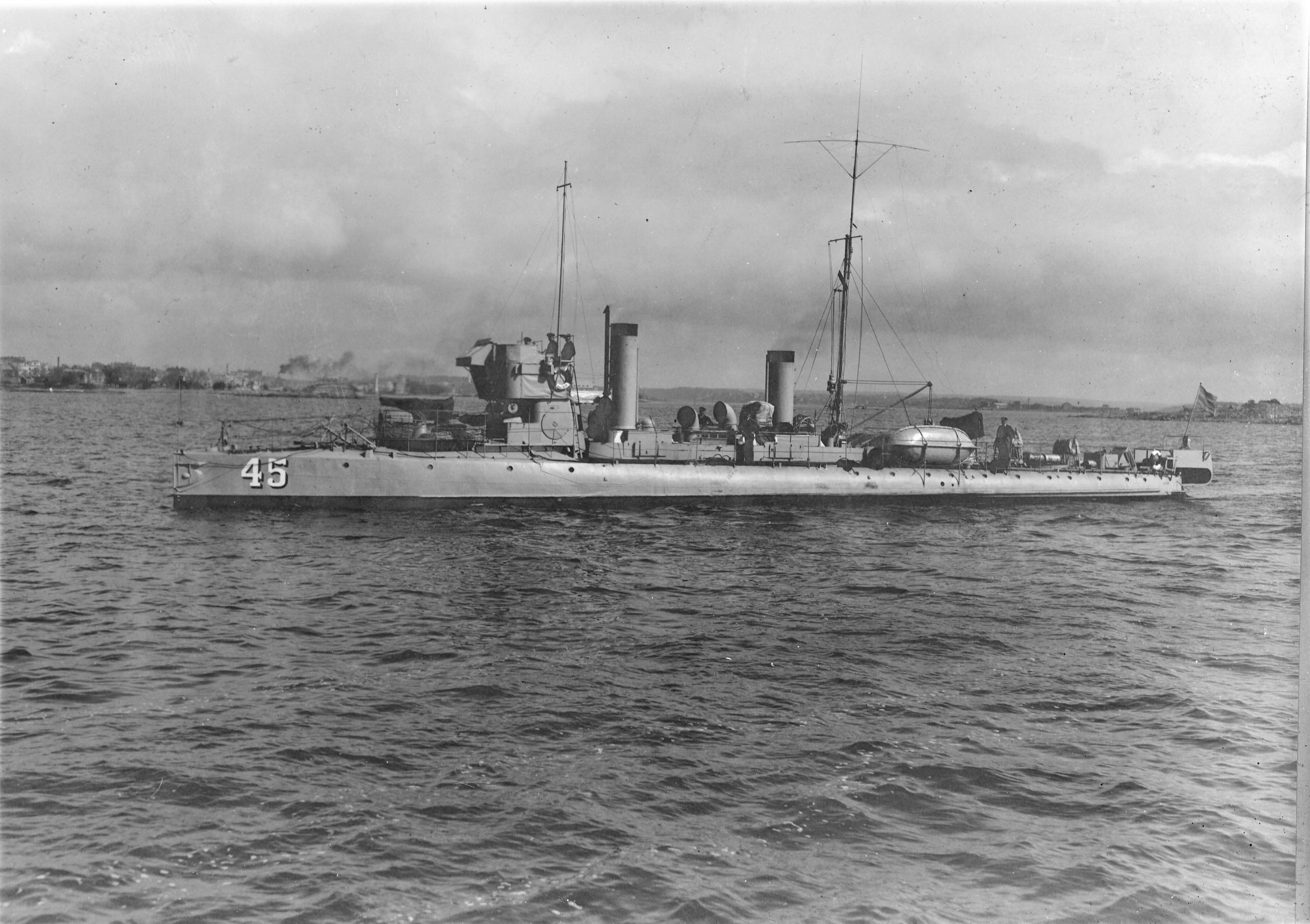
- HSwMS Altair in 1929, after her conversion into a patrol boat

Class overview
- Name: Plejad class
- Operators: Swedish Navy
- Built: 1905–1910
- In service: ?–1947
- Completed: 17

General characteristics
- Type: Torpedo boat
- Armament: 2 × 18 in (46 cm) torpedo tubes (removed 1928); 2 × 3 lb (1.4 kg) guns; 2 × 6 lb (2.7 kg) guns

The Plejad-class torpedo boat was a series of 17 first-class torpedo boats operated by the Swedish Navy during the first half of the 20th century. In the 1920s, the vessels were refitted as patrol boats and were decommissioned in the 1940s.

== History ==
During the turn of the 20th century, Sweden maintained a modern and powerful navy and regularly invested into the fleet to maintain an edge over other navies in the Baltic. The first ship in the class, HSwMS Plejad, was a prototype built at Le Havre in 1905. While the armament varied for the first three boats, the class was armed with two 3 lb (1.4 kg) guns, two 6 lb (2.7 kg) guns, and two 18 in (46 cm) torpedo tubes. Aside from Plejad, the class was built domestically in Sweden and built between 1907 and 1910. Other characteristics of the ships varied, such as displacement.

Starting 1926, the ships were served as patrol boats. The torpedo tubes were removed and replaced with minesweeping gear. Two years later, each ship was renamed Vedettbåt followed by a unique number. Most of the vessels were stricken in the 1940s and disposed of over the next several years.

== Ships in class ==
Data
Name (renamed)	Launch date	Stricken	Broken up
Plejad (Vedettbåt nr 38)	19 June 1905	1930	–
Castor (Vedettbåt nr 51)	24 April 1909	1940	1947
Pollux (Vedettbåt nr 52)	3 May 1909	1940	1947
Astrea (Vedettbåt nr 42)	1 October 1908	1947	Sunk 1953
Spica (Vedettbåt nr 41)	22 October 1908	1947	1951
Iris (Vedettbåt nr 39)	31 October 1908	1947	Sold 1958
Thetis (Vedettbåt nr 40)	19 September 1908	1947	Sunk (artillery target)
Vega (Vedettbåt nr 53)	17 November 1910	1941	1948
Vesta (Vedettbåt nr 54)	24 November 1910	1941	1947
Altair (Vedettbåt nr 45)	5 June 1909	1941	1951
Argo (Vedettbåt nr 46)	19 September 1909	1940	1947
Antares (Vedettbåt nr 43)	11 June 1909	1947	1951
Arcturus (Vedettbåt nr 44)	26 July 1909	1947	1951
Perseus (Vedettbåt nr 48)	6 April 1910	1947	1951
Polaris (Vedettbåt nr 47)	1 December 1909	1947	1951
Regulus (Vedettbåt nr 49)	20 May 1910	1944	1946
Rigel (Vedettbåt nr 50)	6 April 1910	1944	1949
