= Eva Dillner =

Swedish author

- Born: December 5, 1952 (age 73); Stockholm, Sweden
- Occupation: Author

Eva Dillner (born 5 December 1952 in Stockholm) is a Swedish author. She grew up in Linköping and at the age of fourteen moved with her family to the United States, where she stayed until she was 30.

== Bibliography ==
- Dillner, Eva (2003). The naked truth: an exercise in therapeutic storytelling and the principles involved in becoming finally free. [Bloomington, Ind.]: 1st Books Library. ISBN 1-4140-1518-6
- Dillner, Eva (2003). God put a dream in my heart: handbook of life therapy. [United States]: 1st Books. ISBN 1-4107-4240-7
- Dillner, Eva (2005). The pathfinder process: exploring the potential of organizations and relations. Bloomington, Ind. : AuthorHouse, cop. 2005. Libris länk. ISBN 1-4208-0613-0
- Dillner, Eva (2006). Våga leva. Eksjö: Divine design. ISBN 978-91-976309-1-7
- Dillner, Eva (2010). Meandering mind (2., [rev.] ed.). Eksjö: Divine Design. ISBN 9789197823128
- Dillner, Eva (2011). Z 2 A. Eksjö: Divine design. ISBN 978-91-978231-3-5
- Dillner, Eva (2011). Z 2 a. Eksjö: Divine design. ISBN 978-91-978231-3-5
- Dillner, Eva (2014). Konstriket. Divine Design. ISBN 9789198038729
