= National Aeronautical Research Institute =

- Flygtekniska försöksanstalten (FFA)

Agency overview
- Formed: 1940
- Dissolved: 31 December 2000
- Superseding agency: Defence Research Agency
- Headquarters: Ulvsunda, Sweden
- Parent department: Ministry of Trade (1940-1963), Ministry of Defence (1963-2000)

The National Aeronautical Research Institute (Swedish: Flygtekniska försöksanstalten, FFA), was a former Swedish state governmental authority under the Ministry of Defence with the aim to conduct research, development and experimentation in the aeronautical field. The FFA was located in Ulvsunda industrial park in Bromma, Stockholm.

== History ==
The large facility at Ranhammarsvägen was designed by architect Erik and Lars-Erik Lallerstedt (father and son). The FFA was established in 1940 and its first director was Professor Ivar Malmer. Its task was, in accordance with its instruction, to promote the development of aviation technology in Sweden and remunerated conduct aeronautical research and experimentation. Operations were focused on aerodynamic research and testing activities related to the design of the lifting and controlling elements in aircraft and missiles, and partly to the strength of materials research and testing activities mainly relating to so called high-strength lightweight structures.

Initially the agency sorted under the Ministry of Trade, but was transferred in 1963 to the Ministry of Defence. The agency was led by a board of directors. Members of this was the head of the FFA, who was the chairman, and six other members which were appointed by the King in Council. The head of the FFA was a Director General. It was organized in an office and four departments, namely the Aerodynamic Department, Strength of Materials Department, Metrology Department and the Operation Department.

The FFA was disbanded on 31 December 2000, when it together with the National Defence Research Institute (FOA) on 1 January 2001 formed the Defence Research Agency (FOI). Later cutbacks in the Swedish defense research subsequently led to the reduction within the FOI and several parts of the former FFA activities, which after a few years ceased to be operated as a separate department. Operations in experimental aerodynamics, primarily based on wind tunnel testing, which formed a large part of FFA activities both before and immediately after the incorporation of the FOI, was taken over 1 July 2008 by the consulting firm Sjöland & Thyselius AB. A new company, Sjöland & Thyselius Aerodynamic Research Centre AB (STARCS), was formed to continue this business. It ceased its operations in 2011.

== Heads ==
- 1940–1948: Ivar Malmer, Deputy Director-General (acting 1940-1942)
- 1948–1967: Bo Lundberg, Deputy Director-General 1948-1962 (acting 1947-1948), Director General 1962-1967
- 1967–1981: Åke Sundén, Director General
- 1981–1986: Sven-Olof Olin, Director General
- 1986–1996: Lars-Bertil Persson, Director General
- 1996–2000: Hans Dellner, Director General

== Gallery ==
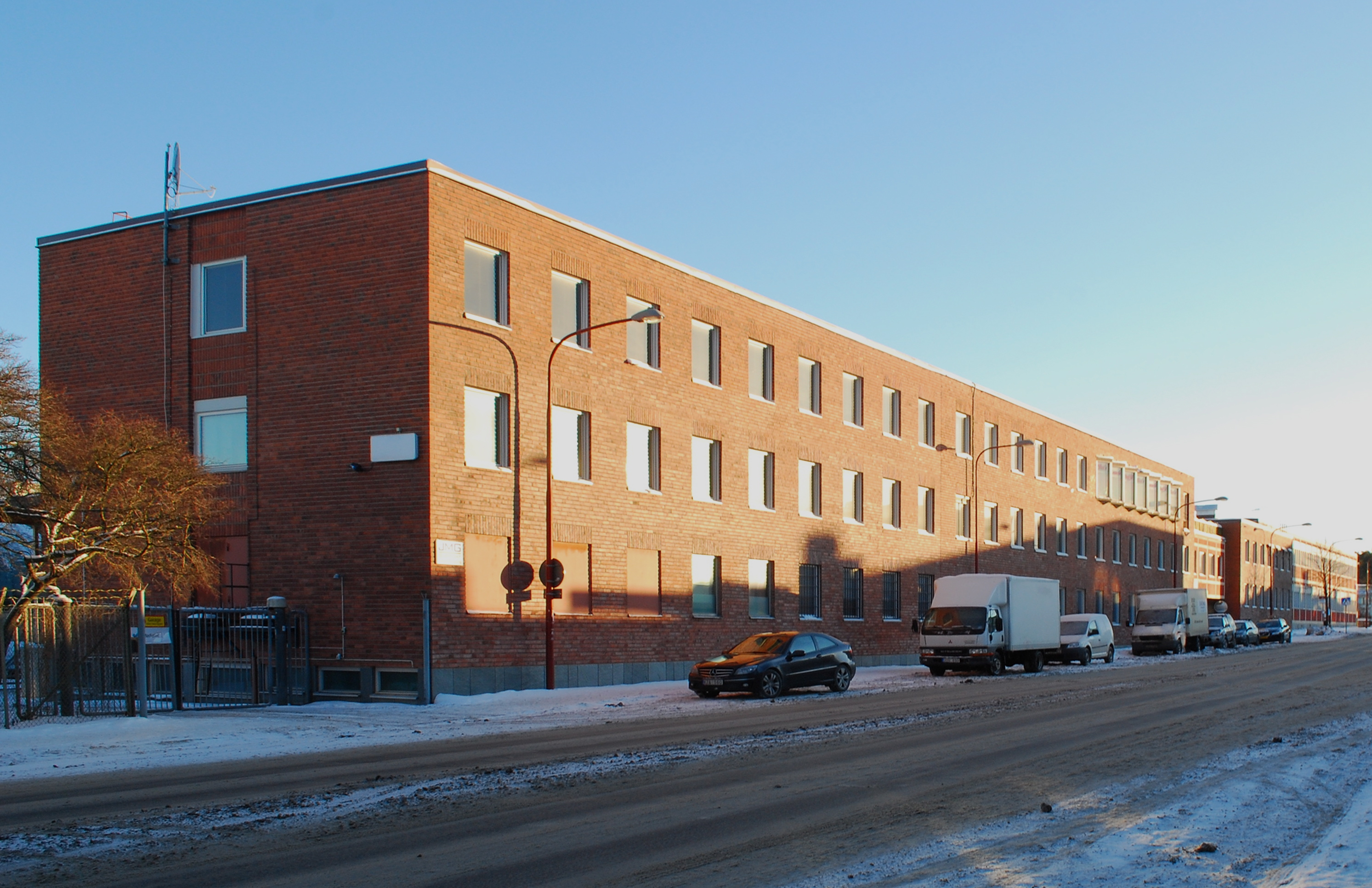
FFA building in Ulvsunda.

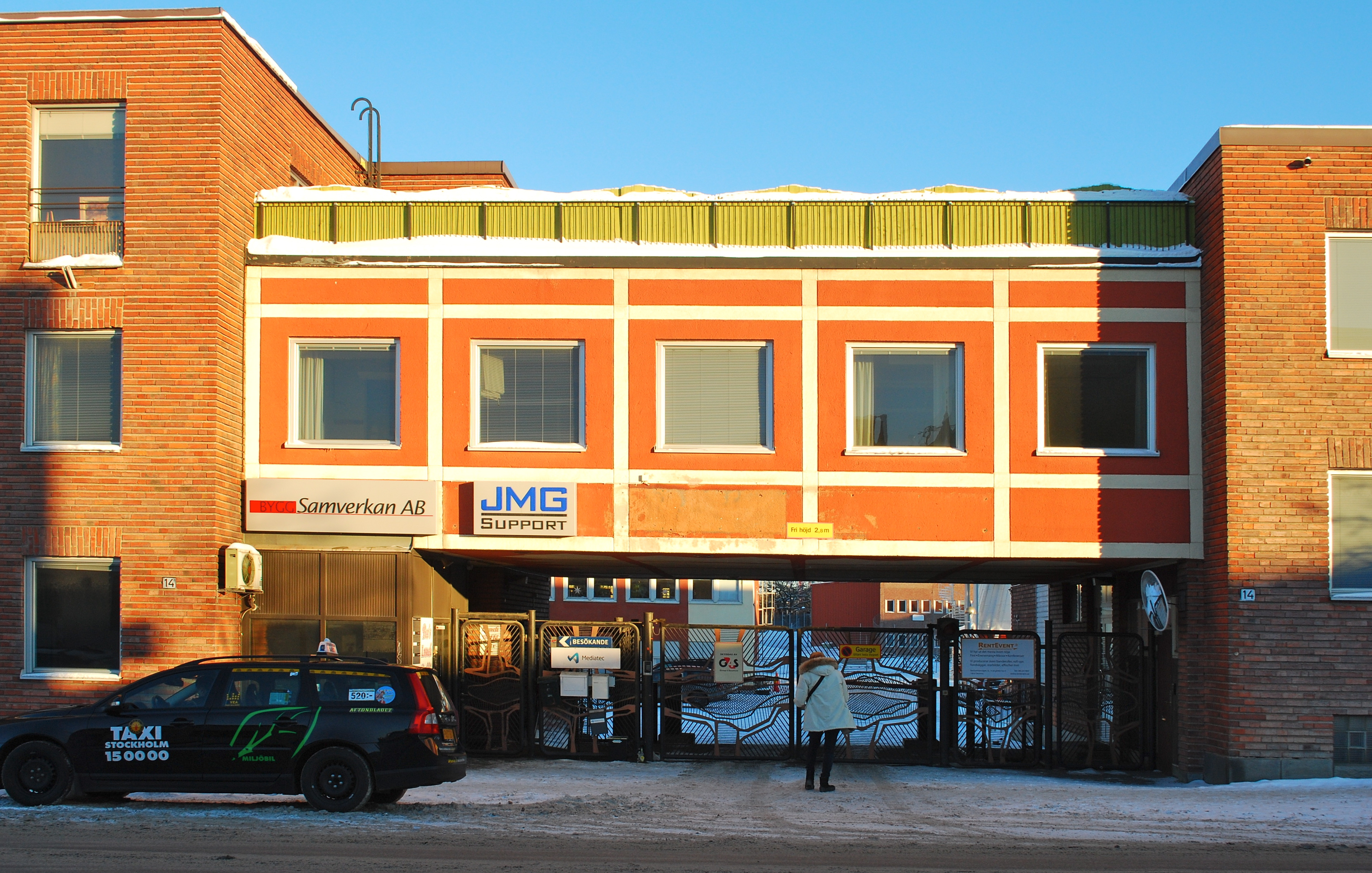
The main entrance to the FFA's former headquarters in Ulvsunda.

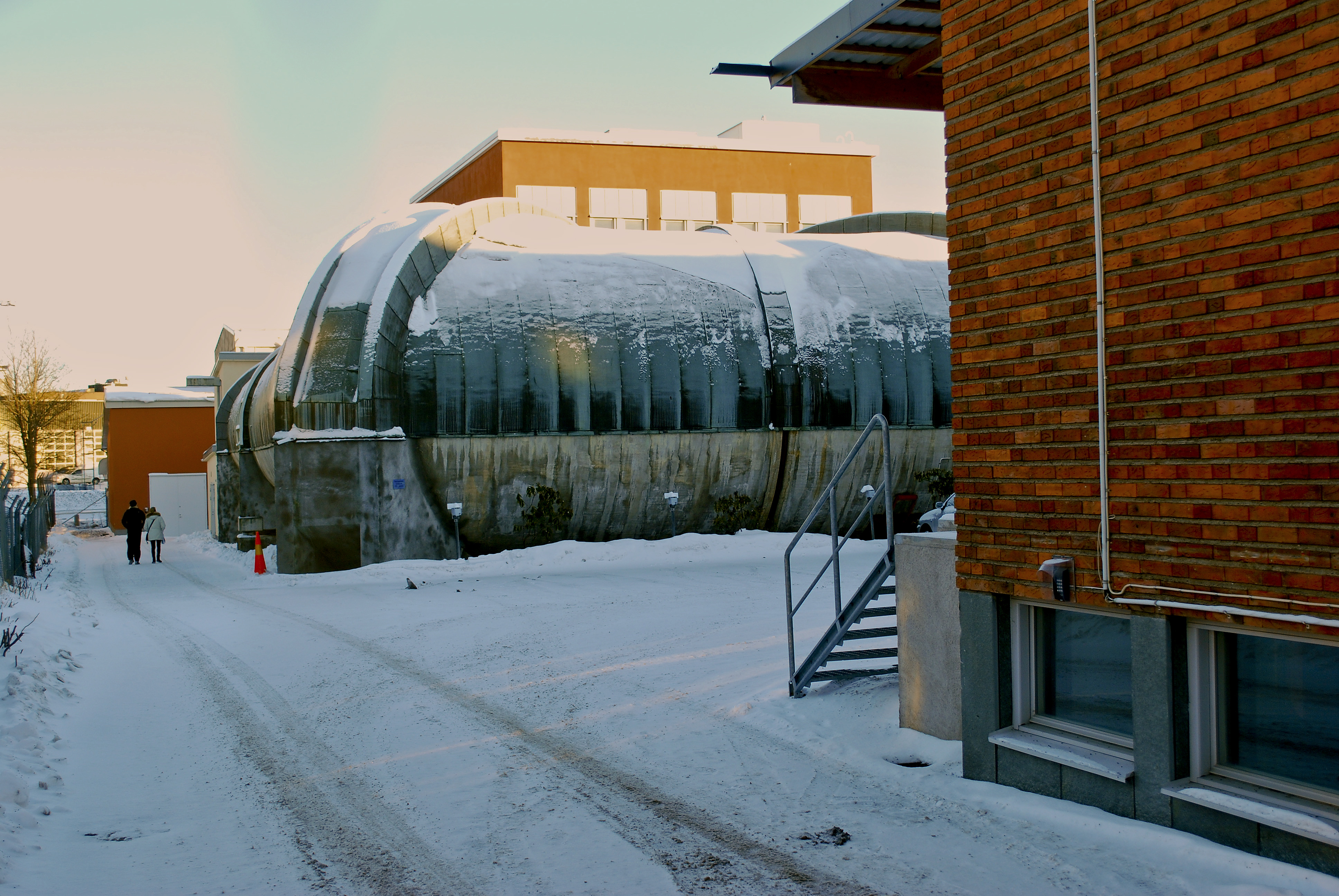
Ulvsunda complex's courtyard with the former wind tunnel.
