= Thulin Medal =

Swedish Society of Aeronautics and Astronautics award

- Sponsored by: Swedish Society of Aeronautics and Astronautics
- Date: 1944
- Country: Sweden

The Thulin Medal (Swedish: Thulinmedaljen) is an annual award given by the Swedish Society of Aeronautics and Astronautics. It is given to individuals who have contributed to the advancement of aeronautical or aerospace engineering through their studies or work.

The award, approved by the Royal Swedish Academy of Engineering Sciences, is considered Sweden's highest recognition in the aerospace field.

The Thulin Medal was established in 1944 in memory of Enoch Thulin, a Swedish aviation pioneer. The medals can be in gold, silver and bronze and are awarded annually on 14 May, the date on which Thulin died at an air show.
