= Saab 32 Lansen =

Swedish fighter aircraft

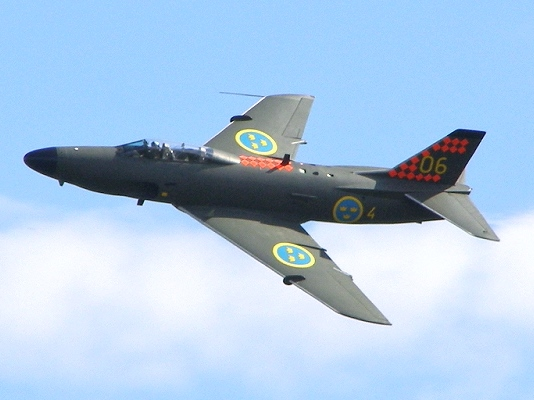
- A Saab J 32D at Kristianstad Airshow, 2006

General information
- Type: Fighter; Attack aircraft; Reconnaissance aircraft
- Manufacturer: Saab AB
- Primary user: Swedish Air Force
- Number built: 450

History
- Manufactured: 1954–1960
- Introduction date: 1956
- First flight: 3 November 1952
- Retired: 1997

The Saab 32 Lansen (English: The Lance (Note: The names of Swedish combat aircraft, like Viggen or Draken, are in the definite form.)) is a two-seat, transonic military aircraft designed and manufactured by the Swedish aircraft manufacturer Saab AB.

In late Autumn 1946, development of the Lansen began as a successor to the Saab B 18/S 18 attack aircraft. In December 1948, an initial contract for the design and mockup of Saab's proposed P1150 design was issued. As the design was refined, plans to use the indigenous STAL Dovern turbojet engine were put aside due to technical difficulties in favour of the license-built Rolls-Royce Avon powerplant. On 3 November 1952, the first prototype performed its maiden flight. In 1953, series production of the type began, after flight testing and several refinements.

Deliveries of the Lansen to the Swedish Air Force (Flygvapnet) took place between 1955 and 1960. It was the service's first twin-seat jet aircraft as well as the first equipped with an integrated search radar. Three principal variants of the Lansen were produced, these being for attack (A 32A), fighter (J 32B), and reconnaissance (S 32C) missions. Later built aircraft were equipped with a more powerful model of the Avon engine and increasingly capable electronics. During its lengthy operational life, the Lansen also served in secondary roles, including as an electronic warfare platform, target tug, and research aircraft. The majority were retired during the 1990s following the end of the Cold War.

== Development ==
In Autumn 1946, the Saab company began internal studies aimed at developing a replacement aircraft for the Saab B 18/S 18 as Sweden's standard attack aircraft. In 1948, Saab was formally approached by the Swedish Government with a request to investigate the development of a turbojet-powered strike aircraft, to replace a series of 1940s vintage attack, reconnaissance and night-fighter aircraft in the Flygvapnet: the B 18/S 18, J 21R/A 21R and J 30 (de Havilland Mosquito). Out of several differing design studies performed, including a twin-engine aircraft intended to be powered by a pair of de Havilland Ghost turbojet engines, Saab settled on a single-engine design, which was initially designated the P1150.

Its basic design also drew upon materials obtained from Switzerland, including drawings on Messerschmitt's P.1101, P.1110, P.1111 and P.1112 projects. SAAB's project manager Frid Wänström retrieved these secret papers from Switzerland to Sweden in 1945. The documents originated from Messerschmitt engineers who fled to Switzerland at the end of the Second World War. Among them were the engineer and aerodynamicist Hermann Behrbohm, who joined Saab's core team around the Saab 29 Tunnan and upcoming aircraft like the Saab 32 Lansen and Saab 35 Draken.

On 20 December 1948, a phase one contract for the design and mock-up of the proposed aircraft was issued, formally initiating development work upon the P1150. The requirements laid out by the Swedish Air Force for the P1150 were demanding: it had to be able to attack anywhere along Sweden's 2,000 km (1,245 miles) of coastline within one hour of launch from a central location. It had to be capable of being launched in any weather conditions and at day or night. In response, Saab elected to develop a twin-seat aircraft with a low-mounted wing, and equipped with advanced electronics. The P1150 broke new grounds for the Swedish Air Force, being their first two-seat jet aircraft, and the first to carry a built-in search radar.

Saab had initially envisaged powering the P1150 with the indigenously produced STAL Dovern turbojet engine. Both timescale and technical difficulties encountered during the development of the Dovern resulted in the Swedish government electing to replace the intended Dovern engine with the license-built Rolls-Royce Avon Series 100 turbojet engine instead, designated RM.5. The single Avon engine provided the Saab A 32A with a thrust to weight ratio of about 0.3, and enabled the aircraft to be roughly 10,000lb heavier than the twin engine Saab 18 it replaced. The later-produced J 32B interceptor variant received the upgraded and significantly more powerful RM6A Avon engine instead.

On 3 November 1952, the first P1150 prototype conducted its first flight. The design of the prototypes had initially featured both Fowler flaps and a leading edge slot. This slot was discarded as unnecessary after trials with the prototypes and never appeared on subsequent production aircraft. Triangular fences were added near the wing roots during flight testing in order to improve airflow when the aircraft was being flown at a high angle of attack. A small batch of P1150 prototypes completed design and evaluation trials. In 1953, series production of the newly designated Saab 32 Lansen began. Development work on the project involved more than 2,000,000 man-hours in total.

In 1955, the first production A 32A Lansen attack aircraft were delivered to the Swedish Air Force. Deliveries of this variant proceeded through to mid 1958, at which point manufacturing activity switched to the other two variants of the Lansen, the J 32B and S 32C. These two models differed substantially from the first. The J 32 B was fitted with a new engine for greater flight performance, and new navigation and fire control systems. On 7 January 1957, the first J 32 B Lansen conducted its maiden flight. On 26 March 1957, the first S 32C Lansen performed its first flight. Production of the Lansen continued until May 1960.

== Design ==
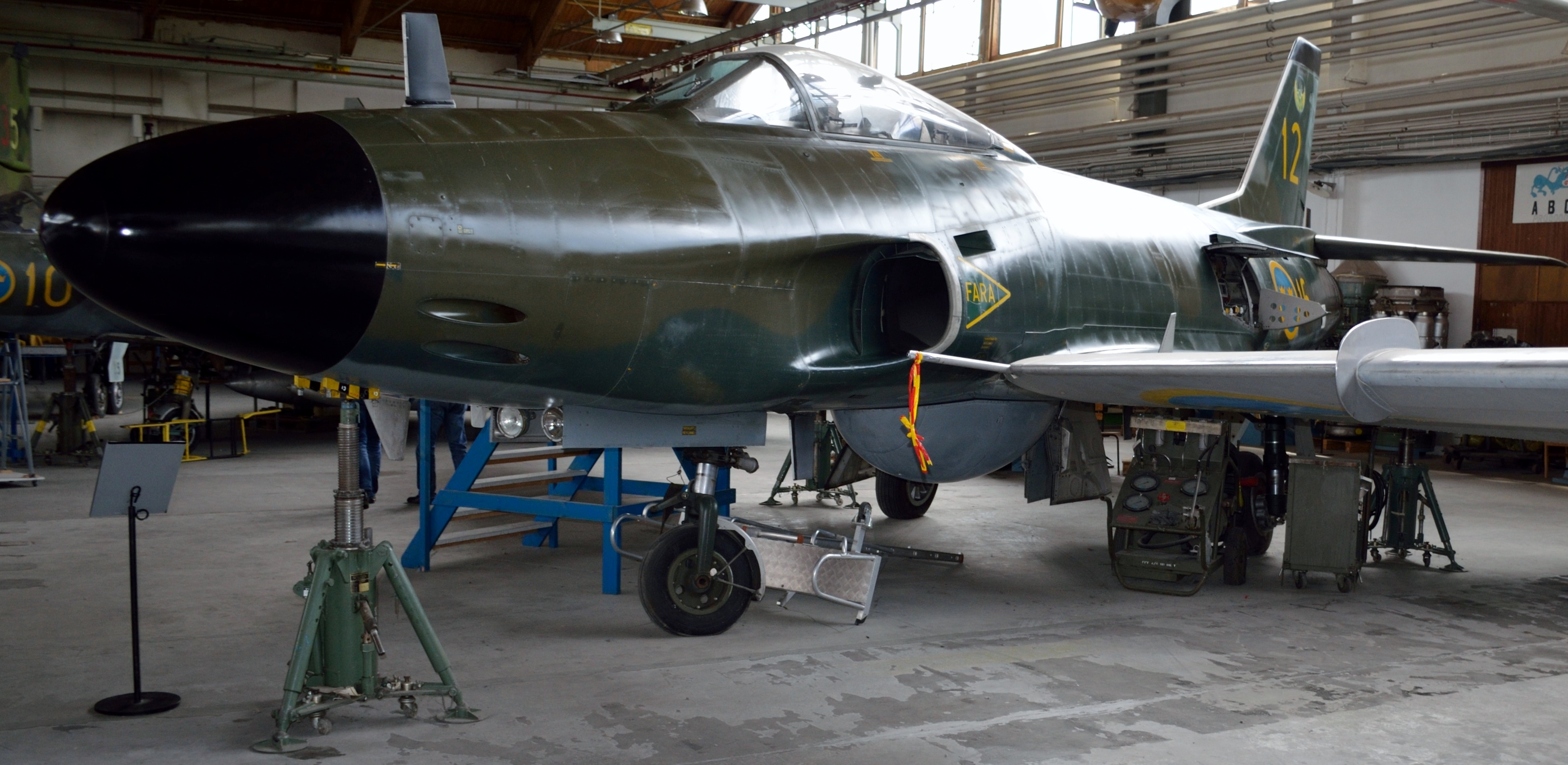
A J 32E Lansen on static display

The Saab 32 Lansen had a straightforward general arrangement, being one of the first aircraft in the world to be specifically developed to fly attack missions. From the outset, it was designed to effectively accommodate the installation of electronic warfare and weapons systems. The aircraft could be armed with a total of four 20 mm cannons, and wing pylons for various calibers of rockets and assorted bombs. The J 32 variant carried four 30 mm ADEN cannons. The A 32 ("A" stands for attack) had an armament of four 20 mm Bofors m/49 cannon hidden under flaps in the nose. The J 32 differed substantially from the other variant, Saab describing it as "to all intents a new aircraft", being fitted with a more powerful engine and newer armaments and a different radar.

The Lansen's nose contained the Ericsson mapping and navigation radar, the forward antenna housed in a large blister fairing underneath the fuselage, directly forward of the main landing gear. This radar worked in conjunction with the Rb 04C anti-ship missile, one of the earliest cruise missiles in western service. The attack variant of the Lansen could carry up to two RB04 missiles, one underneath each wing. (Note: The RB 04 missile would use the Lansen's radar for target lock-on and for the missile's initial programming; after launch it would use its own active terminal homing with no further reliance on the aircraft's radar.) On the reconnaissance variant of the Lansen, up to six cameras could be installed in the place of the four cannon. (Note: The initial camera configuration included two SKa 17 cameras with 5.1 inch lenses and two SKa 18 with 36.2 inch lenses. In 1962, the configuration was updated to a single SKa 15 camera with a 3.9 inch lens, three SKa 16 cameras with 3.9 inch lenses, and two Ska 23 cameras with 23.6 inch lenses.) The camera bodies required the installation of chin blisters on the upper fuselage of the nose. The Lansen could carry up to 12 M62 flash bombs for night photography.

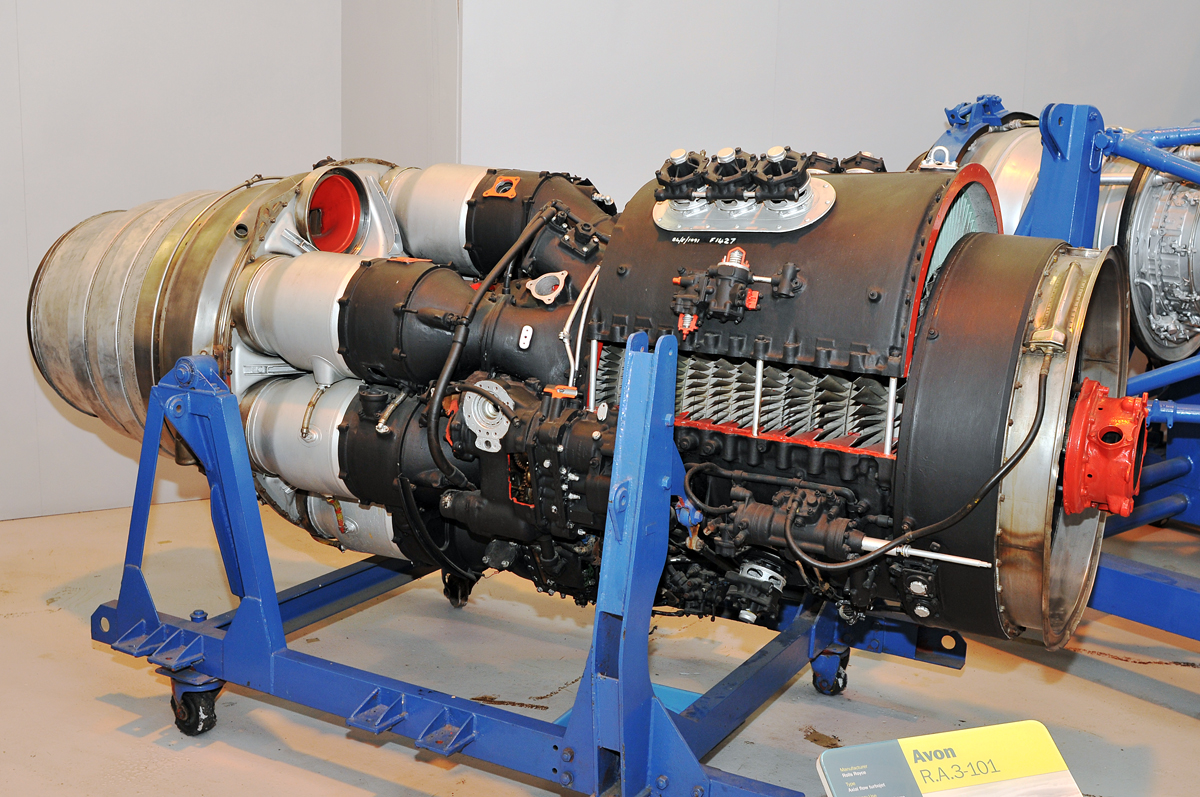
A Rolls-Royce Avon engine

The fuselage of the Lansen was relatively well streamlined, being the first aircraft for which the outer skin curvature and joints between skin panels had been defined by mathematical calculation in order to reduce drag, achieved via an early application of computer technology. The wing had a 10 per cent laminar profile and a 35° sweep. Hydraulically-boosted ailerons and large Fowler flaps on the wings comprised the primary flight control surfaces, as did the hydraulically assisted elevators of the powered tailplane. Four airbrakes were on the sides of the rear fuselage.

The Lansen had a tricycle undercarriage with a single wheel on all of the landing gear. Other wing features include one-section stall fences on the outer-thirds of the wing, a pitot tube on the right wingtip, and three underwing hardpoints. To test the 35° sweepback design of the Lansen's wing, a half-scale wing was mounted on a Saab Safir, designated Saab 202 Safir.

The Lansen was powered by a single afterburning Svenska Flygmotor RM5 turbojet engine, which was a license-produced Rolls-Royce Avon RA.3/Mk.109 engine manufactured by Svenska Flygmotor. For easy maintenance access to the engine, the aircraft's entire aft fuselage was detachable. The air intakes for the engine were located just forwards and above the wing. The two-man pilot and navigator crew were contained in a pressurised cockpit, equipped with a single-piece clamshell canopy. A second windscreen separated the cockpit in between the pilot and navigator, to protect the latter in case of inadvertent jettisoning of the canopy.

== Operational history ==
On 25 October 1953, a SAAB 32 Lansen attained a Mach number of at least 1.12 while in a shallow dive, exceeding the sound barrier. In December 1955, deliveries of the A 32A attack variant began, allowing the swift retirement of the last piston-powered B 18 bomber from Swedish service shortly thereafter. According to Bill Gunston and Peter Gilchrist, the A 32A proved to be extremely effective, both in terms of serviceability and the accuracy of its armaments. Between 1958 and 1960, 54 S32 C reconnaissance aircraft were manufactured. On 2 May 1960, the last Lansen was delivered to the Flygvapnet.

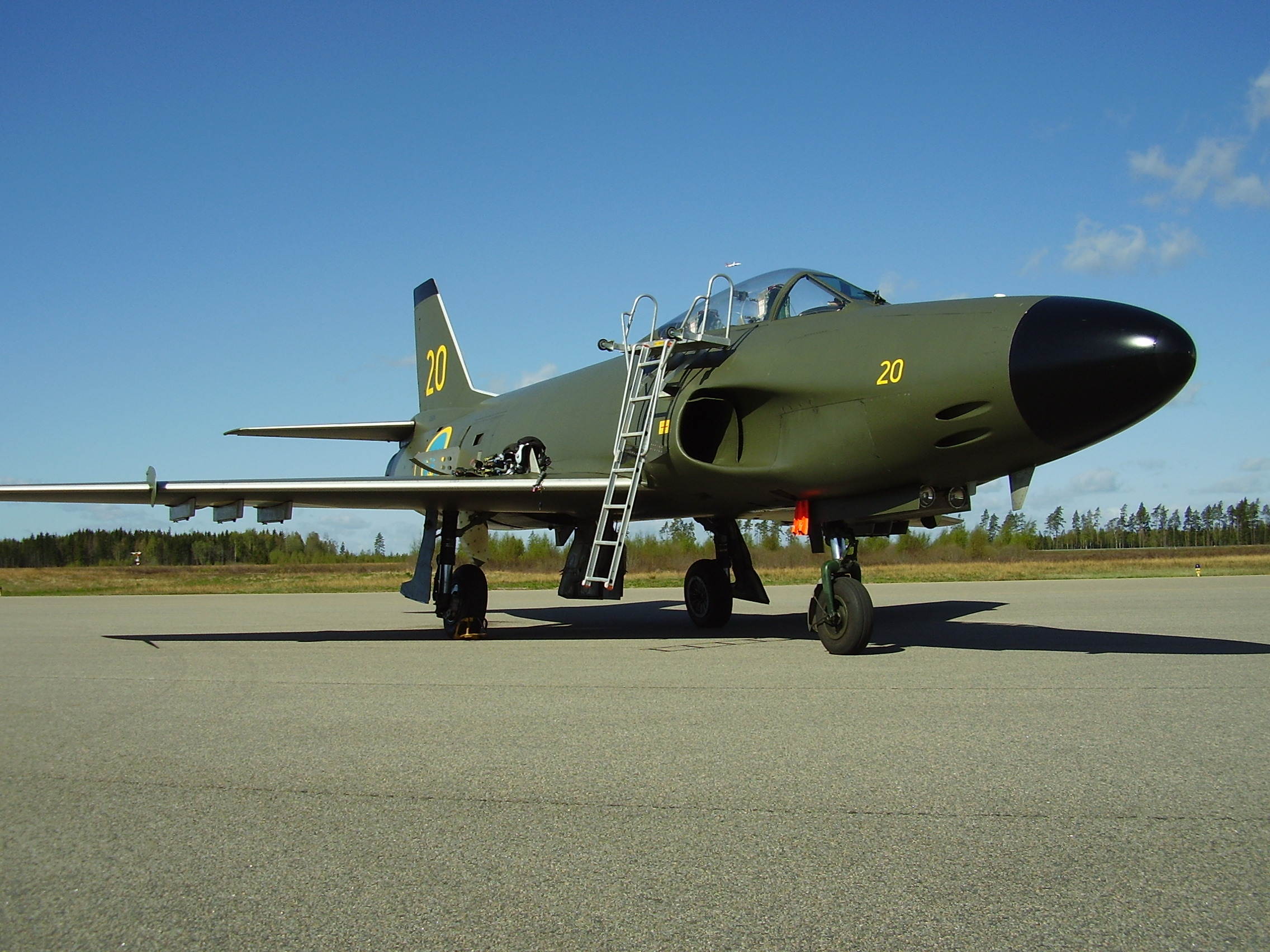
A J 32B Lansen at Växjö Air Show 2012. This aircraft was the last to be built

One intended use for the A 32A was as an aerial delivery system for nuclear or chemical weapons. In the 1950s and 1960s, Sweden operated a nuclear weapons program, but never produced such weapons.

Accidents destroyed a third of all Lansens during 25 years of service, killing 100 crew, along with 7 civilians in Vikbo. The accidents were due to a combination of technical faults, the aircraft not being ready for service, and training deficiencies in regards to flying at night and in adverse weather.

In the 1960 Vikbo crash, pilot Uno Magnusson's A 32A suffered an engine outage, and ejected before crashing into a farmhouse, killing all seven civilian occupants. The crash was due to a known fault which occurred when a drop tank was fitted; the fighter variant J32 B had been forbidden from using the drop tank. Replacement parts to correct the fault were available at the base but had not yet been fitted. The crash's causes were suppressed from the public by the Flygvapnet press office. As the victims were civilians, they were not included in official accident statistics.

The A 32 Lansen was Sweden's last purpose-built attack aircraft. In June 1971, the replacement of the A 32A formally began, the more advanced Saab 37 Viggen being slowly used to take over its attack responsibilities. (Note: Since the early 1960s, the Swedish Air Force had developed the Viggen as the specified successor to the Lansen in the attack role.) As the type was gradually being replaced by more modern types, the Saab 32 continued to be operated into the late 1990s as target tugs and electronic warfare platforms, with 20 J 32Bs converted for these duties. In 2010, at least two Lansens were still operational, having the sole task of taking high altitude air samples for research purposes in collaboration with the Swedish Radiation Safety Authority. One of these collected volcanic ash samples in mid 2010. As of April 2020, all aircraft have been withdrawn from active service.

== Variants ==
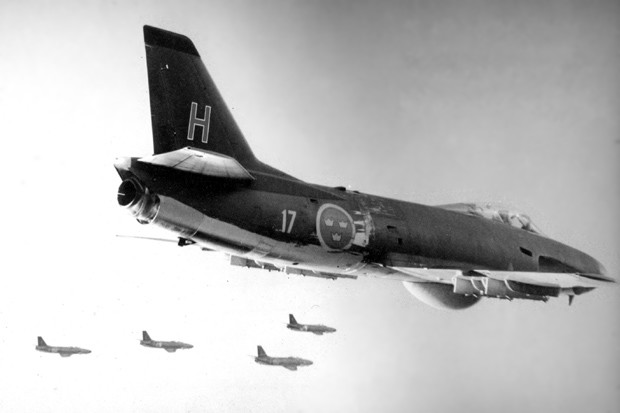
A 32A Lansen from F 17, 1960

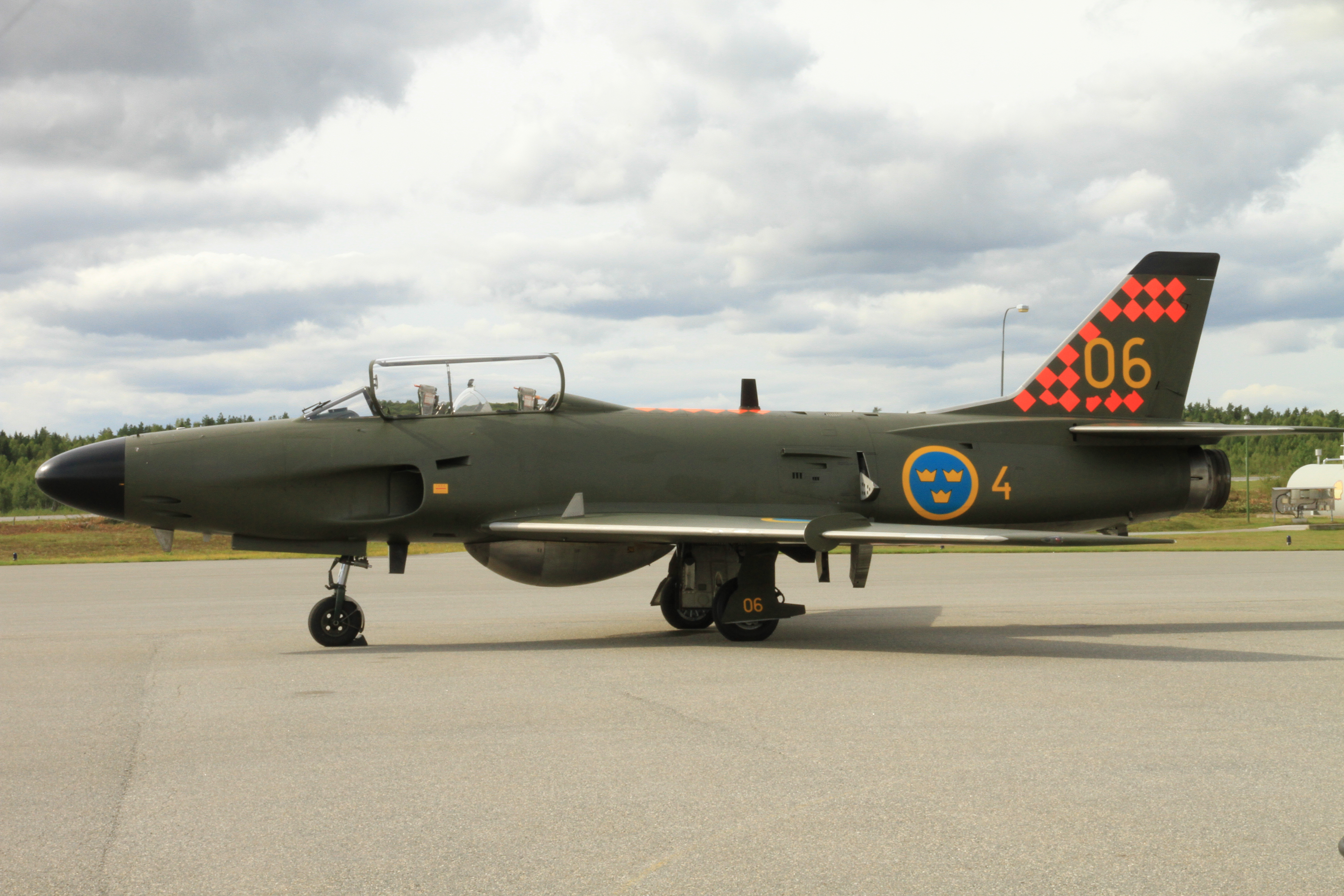
A Saab J 32D Lansen at Flygfest 2011, Örebro, Sweden

A 32A
Ground-attack and maritime-strike version. 287 aircraft built between 1955 and 1957. Retired in 1978. Armed with four 20 mm Bofors m/49 cannons and could carry two SAAB RB 04 missiles, unguided rocket pods and a variety of different bombs up to 3x600 kg bombs. Equipped with Radarvarnare F9/5 Radar warning receiver and Box-3 chaff dispenser.
J 32B
All-weather fighter version, initially operated only for bad weather and night fighter duties. Two prototypes and 118 production aircraft built between 1958 and 1960. Retired in 1973. Armed with four 30 mm ADEN guns, Rb 24 missiles (license-built AIM-9 Sidewinder), or 75 mm unguided rocket pods. J 32B was powered by more powerful Svenska Flygmotor RM6A (Rolls-Royce Avon Mk 47A) engine.
S 32C
Specialized maritime and photo reconnaissance version developed from A 32A. 45 aircraft built between 1958 and 1959. Retired in 1978. Equipped with PS-432/A radar with extended range and with six cameras – two SKa 23 (Fairchild K-47), one SKa 15 (Williamson F49 Mk 2) and three SKa 16 (Vinten F95).
J 32D
Target tug version. Six J 32B were modified. Retired in 1997.
J 32E
ECM (electronic warfare and countermeasures) version, used also for ECM training. Fourteen J 32B were modified. Retired in 1997. Aircraft was equipped with jamming system G 24 in one of three versions (for L, S or C bands) used for jamming ground and naval radars. Adrian (for S and C bands) and Petrus (for X band) pods were used for jamming aerial radars.
J 32AD
Project of day fighter version from 1953 as interim solution between the J 29 Tunnan and J 35 Draken, designated J 32AD ("D" stands for Dag [day]). Aircraft was lighter, without radar and armed with four 20 mm and one 30 mm guns in nose and different missiles. None built, 120 Hawker Hunter fighters bought instead.
J 32U
Project of fighter version from 1954 ("U" stands for utveckling [development]) with much better performance than J 32B. Aircraft was equipped with more powerful Rolls-Royce RA 19R engine and had improved wing design. None built.
J 32S/J16
In 1969, at the Norrbotten Wing (F 21), 4 aircraft of the J32B version were modified to become a kind of snow remover by using the heat from the engine to melt snow and ice. The wings and the tail was removed and a small cabin was added on top of the fuselage. Where the engine outlet had been, there was now a square pipe, which lead the air down to the ground. The type was tested and evaluated at F 21 until 1971, when the project was cancelled. The project was cancelled due to low efficiency and a very high fuel-consumption. There was also a problem with the welding in the pipe. The naming of the version is pretty simple, J32S (S stands for Snö [Snow]) and J16, simply because half of the aircraft was removed in order to create the J32S.

== Surviving aircraft ==
One aircraft has been restored to flying condition and takes part in air force shows. This is a J32D model which was formerly 32606, now registered as SE-RME. Production number 32543 is flying under registration SE-RMD as of 2017, for the Swedish Air Force Historic Flight.

Additionally, a number of non flying airframes are on static display at various museums and former air force bases.

- #32070: Gate guardian at Skaraborg Wing (F 7) in Såtenäs.
- #32085: In a museum at former Hälsinge Wing (F 15) in Söderhamn.
- #32127: On display by the drive way to the civilian terminal in Halmstad. Consists of parts from 32127, 32094 and, after the overhaul in 2019, the rear part of 32035.
- #32151: In a museum at former Blekinge Wing (F 17) in Kallinge.
- #32197: At the Swedish Air Force Museum in Linköping.
- #32259: Gate guardian at former Västgöta Wing (F 6) in Karlsborg
- #32284: On display at the Estrella Warbirds Museum in Paso Robles, US.
- #32510: On display in the Österreichisches Luftfahrtmuseum at Graz airport, Austria.
- #32512: In a museum at the former Göta Wing, today Aeroseum, Säve, Göteborg.
- #32543: On display in Museum of Aeronautics and Astronautics (Madrid) (F 3) in Cuatro Vientos, Madrid, Spain.

== Operators ==
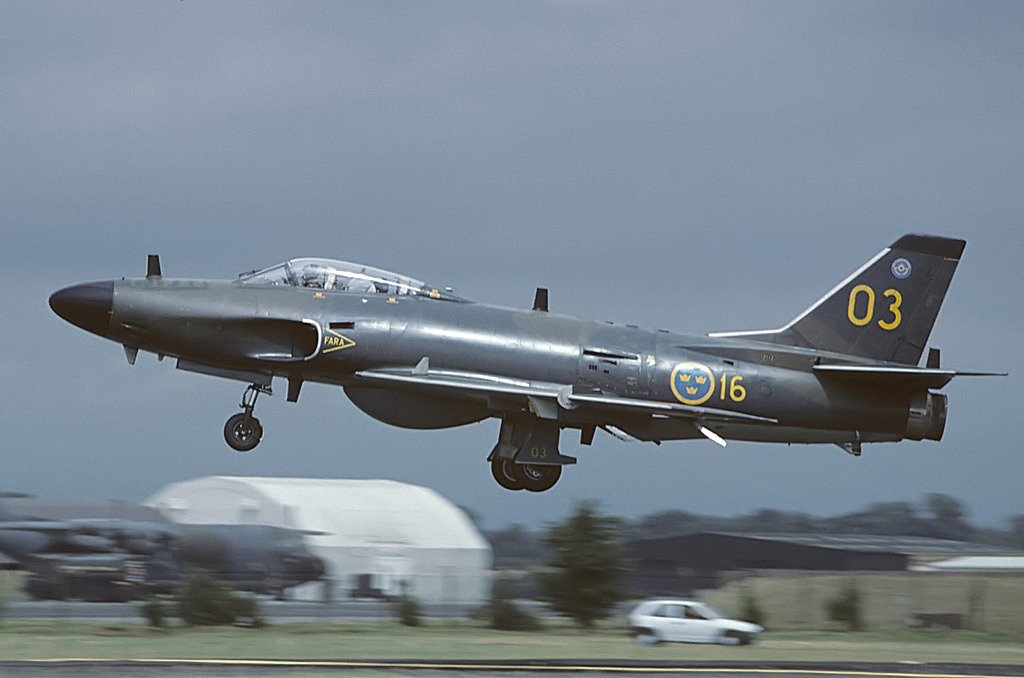
A J32E Lansen of F16, Uppsala, arriving at RAF Fairford for RIAT 94

Sweden

- Swedish Air Force
  - F 1 Hässlö
  - F 3 Malmslätt
  - F 4 Frösön
  - F 6 Karlsborg
  - F 7 Såtenäs
  - F 11 Nyköping
  - F 12 Kalmar
  - F 13 Norrköping
  - F 14 Halmstad
  - F 15 Söderhamn
  - F 16 Uppsala
  - F 17 Kallinge
  - F 21 Luleå

== Specifications (J 32B) ==
Saab J 32 Lansen 3-view drawing

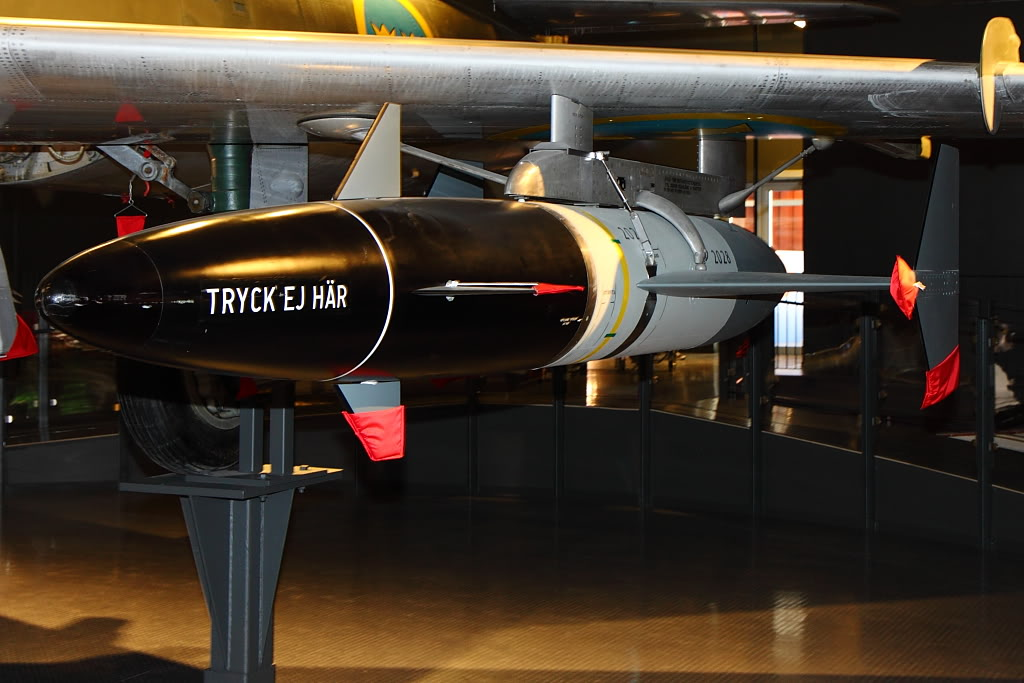
A RB 04 anti-ship missile under the wing on an A32 A Lansen

External videos
- Footage of a SAAB J32 B Lansen of the Swedish Airforce Historic Flight
- Documentary on the J32 Lansen

Data from The Great Book of Fighters, Combat Aircraft since 1945

General characteristics

- Crew: 2
- Length: 14.94 m (49 ft 0 in)
- Wingspan: 13 m (42 ft 8 in)
- Height: 4.65 m (15 ft 3 in)
- Wing area: 37.4 m^{2} (403 sq ft)
- Airfoil: NACA 64A010
- Empty weight: 7,500 kg (16,535 lb)
- Max takeoff weight: 13,500 kg (29,762 lb)
- Powerplant: 1 × Svenska Flygmotor RM6A afterburning turbojet engine, 47 kN (11,000 lbf) thrust dry, 65.3 kN (14,700 lbf) with afterburner

Performance

- Maximum speed: 1,200 km/h (750 mph, 650 kn)
- Range: 2,000 km (1,200 mi, 1,100 nmi)
- Service ceiling: 15,000 m (49,000 ft)
- Rate of climb: 100 m/s (20,000 ft/min)

Armament

- Guns: 4 × 30 mm ADEN cannons 90 rounds each
- Rockets: 4 × 75 mm air-to-air rocket pods
- Missiles: 4 × Rb 24 air-to-air missiles

== See also ==
Aircraft of comparable role, configuration, and era

- Dassault Mystère – Fighter-bomber in the French Air Force
- Grumman F-9 Cougar – US Navy carrier-based fighter aircraft in service 1952-1974
- Hawker Hunter – 1950s family of British fighter aircraft
- McDonnell F3H Demon – US Navy fighter aircraft
- Republic F-84F Thunderstreak – 1950 fighter-bomber aircraft

Related lists

- List of fighter aircraft
- List of military aircraft of Sweden
