= Defence Act of 1958 (Sweden) =

The Defence Act of 1958 (Swedish: Försvarsbeslutet 1958, FB58) was a defence act passed by the Swedish Riksdag on 4 February 1958. It was made with Prague Coup, Korean War and Hungarian Revolution of 1956 as a background, where the threat of nuclear weapons, adaptability and possible acquisition of a Swedish nuclear weapon also played a role.

== Background ==
For Swedish Armed Forces, the defence act meant an investment in quality over quantity, which meant a minor reduction of the Swedish Army while there was a strong redistribution of resources from Swedish Navy to Swedish Air Force, where attack aircraft would take over the tasks of the larger ships. At the same time, the defence budget for each year would be upgraded automatically by 2.5 percent.

The defence act was a broad political majority agreement. The assessments behind the act were not entirely dominated by defence policy considerations, but were also motivated by factual factors such as socio-economic development and the financial situation.

The defence act also meant prioritizing the initial force over endurance. The development of Soviet nuclear weapons and the introduction of tactical nuclear weapons into NATO and the Warsaw Pact led to extensive redeployment in the early 1960s. The increased threat of nuclear weapons entailed demands for increased proliferation, mobility and protection. A nuclear war was judged to lead to a surface war without clear fronts and a higher pace of combat.

== The Army ==
For the army, the defence act meant that a new modern tank would be added. Prior to the defence act, three different alternatives were developed for further studies:

- Alternative A - Anglo-American Development (M60 Patton)
- Alternative T - German-French development (Leopard 1)
- Alternative S - Swedish proposal. A proposal that began to be developed as early as 1956, a carriage in the 30-ton class with a small silhouette, strong protection and good mobility.

Alternative S was the proposal that won the procurement, this due to the Swedish neutrality policy and to some extent also the labour market policy. In order to appear credible as a neutral state, they chose to develop their own carriage. This also led to the creation of jobs in the defence industry. The first prototypes of the S-wagon were ordered for delivery in 1961. In the years 1967–1971, 290 wagons of Tank S (which in the army was named Stridsvagn 103) were delivered and distributed within the armoured troops.

Within the army, it was further decided that five infantry brigades would be disbanded in 1958 and that one armored brigade was reorganized into infantry brigades. In the years 1957–1963, three regiments were also organized as armoured infantry.

== The Air Force ==
For the Air Force, the defence act meant a smaller decommissioning of flotillas, but through this cut, there was room for modernization and improvement of the remaining parts, including the introduction of the aircraft Saab 32 Lansen and Saab 35 Draken. The idea with the defence act was to have the opportunity to meet an attacker at a longer distance and thereby the air force came to be prioritized due to its operational mobility. This prioritization took place at the expense of both the army and the navy.

The types of aircraft that existed in the country were fighter, attack and reconnaissance aircraft and consisted of the aircraft types:

- J29 Tunnan (fighter aircraft and later also reconnaissance aircraft)
- A32 Lansen (attack aircraft and later also reconnaissance aircraft and fighter aircraft)
- J34 Hawker (120 pieces were acquired to increase the hunting capacity while waiting for the J35 Dragon)
- J35 Draken (fighter aircraft intended for fast and high-flying targets, later also as reconnaissance aircraft)

In addition to investing in new aircraft, it was also decided that the Air Force would be provided with an additional 31 bases for a total cost of 250 million and that the total number of air bases would amount to 70 within the Bas 60 system. The bases would be of three different types:

- Base A - used constantly during the year and around the clock
- Base B - temporarily in peace and constantly at war
- Base C - use only in war

== The Navy ==
For Navy, the act meant that the share of the defence budget was reduced from 18 to 12 percent. This was planned to be implemented by gradually replacing the large surface vessels with anti-submarine warfare capability with a larger number of smaller attack vessels. At the same time, submarines would have a greater area of responsibility and increased efficiency In other words: a transition to a light fleet. The size of these new attack vessels did not allow them to be equipped with systems to locate and combat submarines.

Through the defence act, Marine Plan 60 was added. A naval plan that came to guide development within the navy throughout the 1960s. Projects that were added through the defence act included the submarine class Sjöormen-class submarine.

== Printed sources ==
- "Kungl. Maj:ts proposition nr 110 år 1955". riksdagen.se.
- "Kungl. Maj:ts proposition nr 110 år 1957". riksdagen.se.
- "Kungl. Maj:ts proposition nr 110 år 1958". riksdagen.se.
- "Kungl. Maj:ts proposition nr 117 år 1959". riksdagen.se.
- "Kungl. Maj:ts proposition nr 110 år 1962". riksdagen.se.
