= List of delta-wing aircraft =

This is a list of aircraft with delta wings.

Type	Country	Class	Role	Date	Status	No.	Notes
Concorde	UK/France	Supersonic	Transport	1969	Retired		Ogival delta.
Antonov 'M' Masha	USSR	Supersonic	Fighter	1947	Prototype		Tailless. Vertical stabilizers in the form of winglets.
Atlas Cheetah	South Africa	Supersonic	Fighter	1986	Production		Canard development of the Dassault Mirage III
Avión Torpedo	Peru		VTOL	1902	Prototype		Avant-garde design using liquid propellant rockets installed in the tiltwing when swiveled, capable of vertical or horizontal flight.
Avro Vulcan	UK	Subsonic	Bomber	1952	Retired		Tailless.
Avro 707	UK		Experimental	1949	Prototype		Tailless test aircraft for the Avro's jet bomber design
Avro Canada CF-105 Arrow	Canada	Supersonic	Fighter	1959	Prototype		Tailless.
BAC 221	UK	Supersonic	Experimental	1964	Prototype	1	Ogival delta wing fitted to a Fairey Delta 2 to test the Concorde design.
Boeing X-32	US	Supersonic	Fighter	2000	Prototype		Tailless JSF contender.
Boulton Paul P.111	UK	Subsonic	Experimental	1950	Prototype		Tailless.
Boulton Paul P.120	UK	Subsonic	Experimental	1953	Prototype		Tailed development of the P.111.
Buran	USSR	Spaceplane	Transport	1988	Prototype		Tailless.
CAC CA-23	Australia	Supersonic	Fighter	1952	Prototype		Tailed delta.
Chengdu J-7	China	Supersonic	Fighter	1966	Production		Tailed. Chinese development of MiG-21
Chengdu J-9	China	Supersonic	Fighter	1998	Prototype		Canard.
Chengdu J-10	China	Supersonic	Fighter	1998	Production		Canard.
Chengdu J-20	China	Supersonic	Fighter	2011	Production		Canard.
Convair XF-92	US		Fighter	1948	Prototype		Tailless
Convair F2Y Sea Dart	US	Supersonic	Fighter	1953	Prototype		Tailless seaplane.
Convair F-102 Delta Dagger	US	Supersonic	Fighter	1953	Retired		Tailless.
Convair XFY Pogo	US	Propeller	Experimental	1954	Prototype		Tailless VTOL, propeller-driven.
Convair F-106 Delta Dart	US	Supersonic	Fighter	1956	Retired		Tailless.
Convair B-58 Hustler	US	Supersonic	Bomber	1956	Retired		Tailless.
Dassault Mirage I	France	Supersonic	Fighter	1955	Prototype		Tailless.
Dassault Mirage III	France	Supersonic	Fighter	1956	Production		Tailless.
Dassault Mirage IV	France	Supersonic	Bomber	1959	Production		Tailless.
Dassault Mirage 5	France	Supersonic	Fighter	1965	Production		Tailless.
Dassault Mirage 2000	France	Supersonic	Fighter	1978	Production		Tailless.
Dassault Rafale	France	Supersonic	Fighter	1986	Production		Canard.
Dyke Delta	US		Private	1966	Homebuilt		Double-delta.
Eurofighter Typhoon	EU	Supersonic	Fighter	1994	Production		Canard.
Fairey Delta 1	UK	Subsonic	Experimental	1951	Prototype		Tailed. Planned VTOL variant.
Fairey Delta 2	UK	Supersonic	Experimental	1954	Prototype	2	Tailless. First aircraft to exceed 1,000 mph. One example rebuilt as BAC 221.
General Dynamics F-16XL	US	Supersonic	Experimental	1982	Prototype	1	Cranked arrow double-delta.
Gloster Javelin	UK	Subsonic	Fighter	1951	Production		Tailed.
Gluhareff-Sikorsky Dart	US	Propeller	Fighter	1947	Experimental		Propeller-driven delta. Not completed.
HAL Tejas	India	Supersonic	Fighter	2001	Production		Tailless.
Handley Page HP.115	UK	Subsonic	Experimental	1961	Prototype	1	Tailless narrow delta. Experimental into low speed performance of delta wing for Concorde
Hawker Siddeley HS 138	UK	Supersonic	Strike fighter	1969	Prototype		Tailless.
Helwan HA-300	Egypt		Fighter	1969	Prototype		Tailed. Designed by Willy Messerschmitt for Hispano-Aviación in Spain.
IAI Kfir	Israel	Supersonic		1973	Production		Canard development of the Dassault Mirage III.
Lavochkin La-250	USSR		Fighter	1956	Prototype		Tailed.
Lippisch DM1	Germany	Glider	Experimental	1944	Prototype		Tailless. Also known as the Akaflieg Darmstadt/Akaflieg München DM1.
Lockheed A-12	US	Supersonic		1962	Production		Tailless with long chines. Mach 3+
Lockheed YF-12	US	Supersonic	Fighter	1968	Prototype		Tailless with long chines. Mach 3+
Lockheed M-21	US	Supersonic		1966	Prototype		Tailless with long chines. Mach 3+ mothership for D-21.
Lockheed D-21	US	UAV		1971	Prototype		Tailless with long chines. Launched from the M-21.
Lockheed SR-71 Blackbird	US	Supersonic		1964	Production		Tailless with long chines. Mach 3+
Lockheed Martin/Boeing F-22 Raptor	US	Supersonic	Fighter	2005	Production		Clipped.
Löhr Delta	Austria	Propeller	Private	1970s	Experimental	1	Propeller-driven delta. Not completed.
McDonnell Douglas A-4 Skyhawk	US			1954	Production		Ogival delta, with tail.
Mikoyan-Gurevich MiG-21	USSR	Supersonic		1956	Production		Tailed delta
Myasishchev M-50	USSR			1959	Prototype		
Moskalyev SAM-9 Strela	USSR		Experimental	1934	Prototype		Tailless narrow, curved delta.
NASA Space Shuttle Orbiter	US	Spaceplane	Transport	1981	Production		Double delta.
North American XB-70 Valkyrie	US	Supersonic	Bomber	1964	Prototype		Canard capable of Mach 3.
Payen PA-22	France			1941	Prototype		Tandem wing with straight canard plane and delta aft plane
Payen Pa 49	France			1954	Prototype		
Saab 35 Draken	Sweden	Supersonic		1955	Production		Double delta.
Saab 37 Viggen	Sweden	Supersonic		1967	Production		Canard. First close-coupled type.
Saab JAS 39 Gripen	Sweden	Supersonic		1988	Production		Canard.
Shenyang J-8	China	Supersonic		1969	Production		
Short SC.1	UK	Subsonic	Experimental	1957	Prototype	1	Tailless VTOL aircraft.
Sukhoi T-4 / 100 Sotka	USSR	Supersonic	Bomber	1972	Prototype		Canard capable of Mach 3
Sukhoi Su-9	USSR			1956	Production		
Sukhoi Su-11	USSR			1958	Production		
Sukhoi Su-15 (Early models)	USSR	Supersonic	Fighter	1962	Production		Tailed. Later models had a cranked leading edge.
Tupolev Tu-144	USSR	Supersonic	Transport	1968	Production		Double delta with retractable "moustache" foreplanes.
Variviggen	US		Private	1970	Homebuilt		Canard Delta.
Verhees D-Plane 1	Belgium	Propeller	Private	2004	Homebuilt		Cropped delta with elliptical planform.
Verhees D-Plane 2	Belgium	Propeller	Private	2018	Homebuilt		Cropped delta with elliptical planform.
