= APX (disambiguation) =

APX is a complexity class in computer science.

APX also may refer to:

== Organizations ==
- APX Alarm Security Solutions, a residential security company
- Alpha Rho Chi (αρχ), architects' fraternity
- Australia Pacific Exchange
- APX Group, an Anglo-Dutch energy exchange
- Atari Program Exchange, an early computer software publisher

== Militaries ==
- Atelier de Construction de Puteaux, state arsenal belonging to the French Army
- Beretta APX, an Italy semi-automatic pistol
- 47 mm APX anti-tank gun, a France anti-tank gun

== Automotive ==
- Lotus APX, a 2006 concept car
- APX Grand Prix (Apex GP), a fictional race team in the 2025 Brad Pitt sports film F1 (film)

== Technology ==
- Advanced Performance Extensions, a set of Intel x86 architecture extensions
- iAPX, a brand Intel used for some CPUs

== Chemistry ==
- Ascorbate peroxidase, an antioxidant enzyme

== See also ==
- Apex (disambiguation)
- AP10 (disambiguation)
