= PA22 =

PA22 may refer to:

- Payen PA-22, a French experimental aircraft
- Pennsylvania Route 22 (1920s)
- Pennsylvania's 22nd congressional district
- Piper PA-22 Tri-Pacer, an American light aircraft
- U.S. Route 22 in Pennsylvania
