= Delta wing =

Triangle shaped aircraft wing configuration

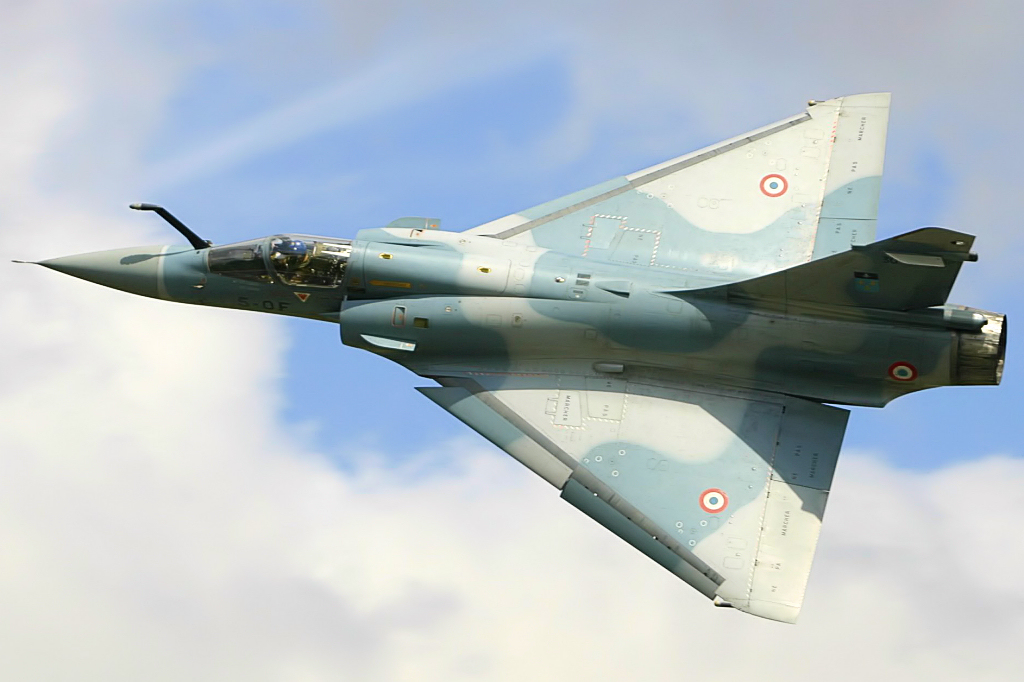
A Dassault Mirage 2000. The French-designed Mirage series is famous for its distinctive delta wing configuration.

A delta wing is a wing shaped in the form of a triangle. It is named for its similarity in shape to the Greek uppercase letter delta (Δ).

Although long studied, the delta wing did not find significant practical applications until the Jet Age, when it proved suitable for high-speed subsonic and supersonic flight. At the other end of the speed scale, the Rogallo flexible wing proved a practical design for the hang glider and other ultralight aircraft. The delta wing form has unique aerodynamic characteristics and structural advantages. Many design variations have evolved over the years, with and without additional stabilising surfaces.

== General characteristics ==
=== Structure ===
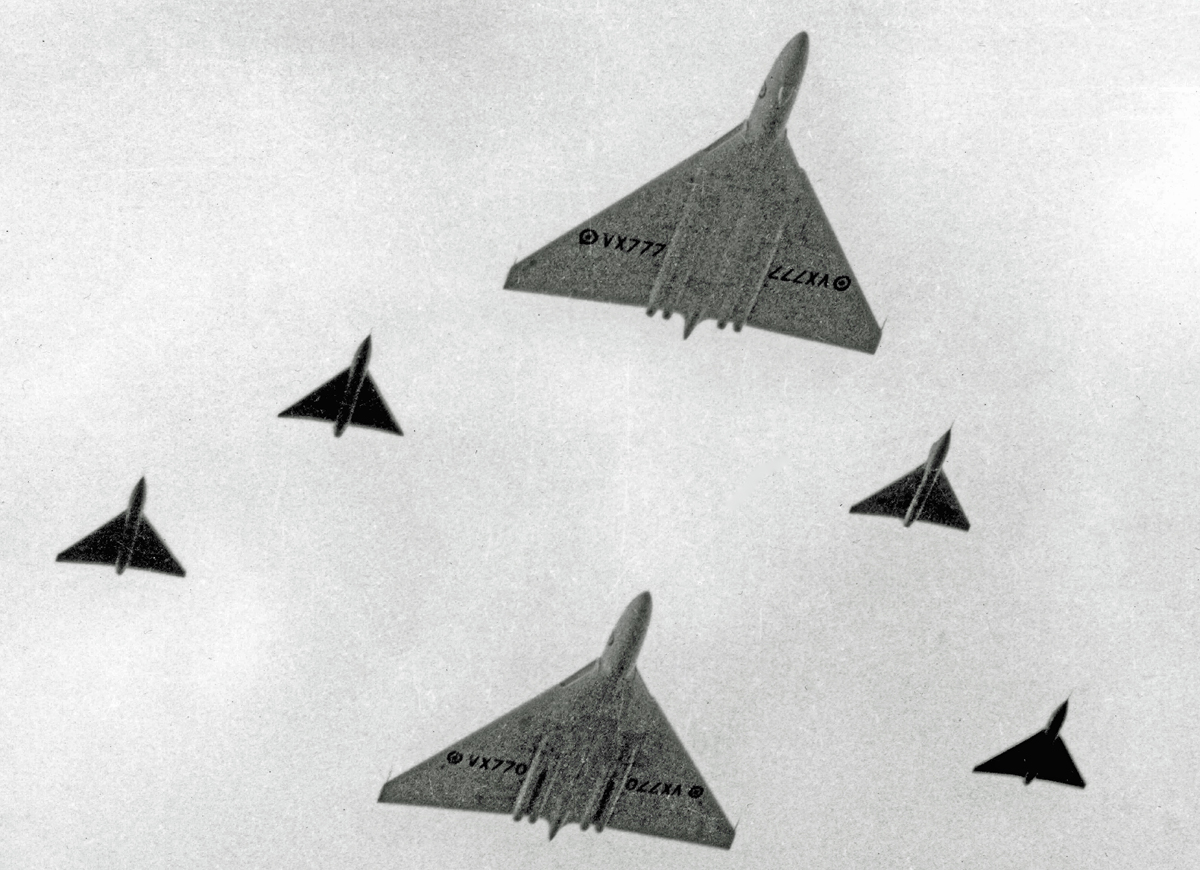
Two Avro Vulcan bombers flying in formation with four Avro 707 experimental aircraft. The Vulcan's delta wing configuration earned it the nickname of 'Tin Triangle'.

The long root chord of the delta wing and minimal area outboard make it structurally efficient. It can be built stronger, stiffer and at the same time lighter than a swept wing of equivalent aspect ratio and lifting capability. Because of this it is easy and relatively inexpensive to build—a substantial factor in the success of the MiG-21 and Mirage aircraft series.

Its long root chord also allows a thicker wing structure for a given aerofoil section. This both enhances its weight-saving characteristic and provides greater internal volume for fuel and other items, without a significant increase in drag. However, on supersonic designs the opportunity is often taken to use a thinner aerofoil instead, in order to reduce drag.

=== Aerodynamics ===
==== Low-speed flight and vortex lift ====
Like any wing, at low speeds a delta wing requires a high angle of attack to maintain lift. At a sufficiently high angle the wing exhibits flow separation, together with an associated high drag.

Ordinarily, this flow separation leads to a loss of lift known as the stall. However, for a sharply-swept delta wing, as air spills up round the leading edge it flows inwards to generate a characteristic vortex pattern over the upper surface. The lower extremity of this vortex remains attached to the surface and also accelerates the airflow, maintaining lift. For intermediate sweep angles, a retractable "moustache" or fixed leading-edge root extension (LERX) may be added to encourage and stabilise vortex formation. The ogee or "wineglass" double-curve, seen for example on Concorde, incorporates this forward extension into the profile of the wing.

In this condition, the centre of lift approximates to the centre of the area covered by the vortex.

==== Subsonic flight ====
In the subsonic regime, the behaviour of a delta wing is generally similar to that of a swept wing. A characteristic sideways element to the airflow develops. In this condition, lift is maximised along the leading edge of the wing, where the air is turned most sharply to follow its contours. Especially for a slender delta, the centre of lift approximates to halfway back along the leading edge.

The sideways effect also leads to an overall reduction in lift and in some circumstances can also lead to an increase in drag. It may be countered through the use of leading-edge slots, wing fences and related devices.

==== Transonic and low-supersonic flight ====
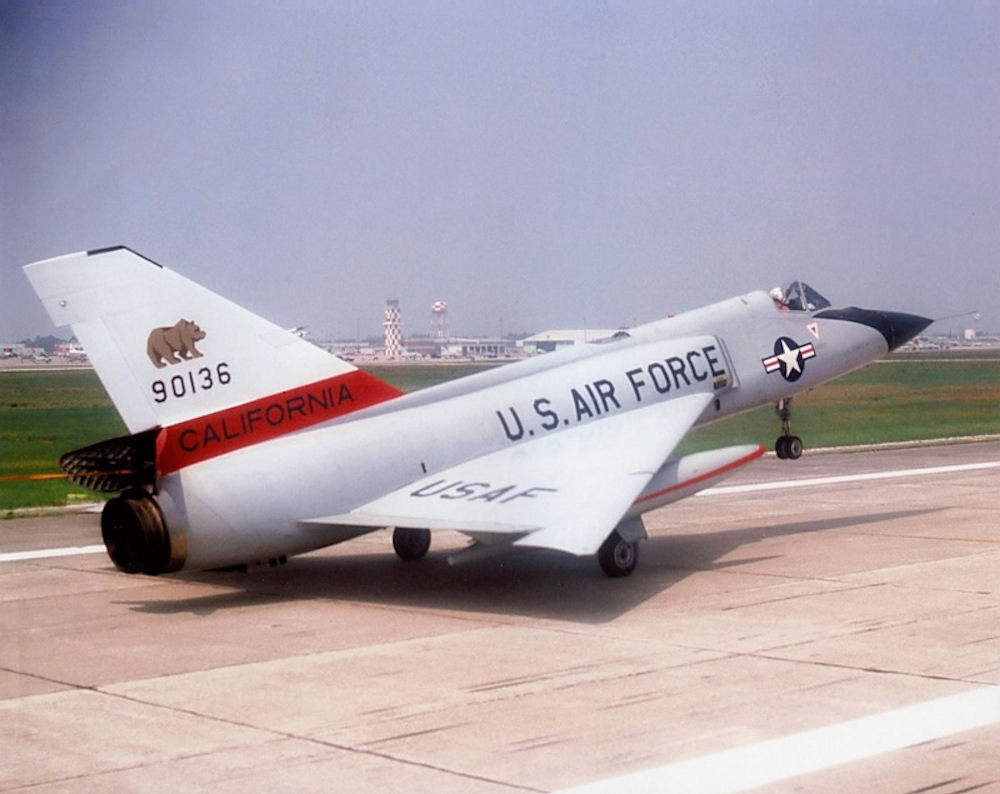
Convair made several supersonic deltas. This is an F-106 Delta Dart, a development of their earlier F-102 Delta Dagger.

With a large enough angle of rearward sweep, in the transonic to low supersonic speed range the wing's leading edge remains behind the shock wave boundary or shock cone created by the leading edge root.

This allows air below the leading edge to flow out, up and around it, then back inwards creating a sideways flow pattern similar to subsonic flow. The lift distribution and other aerodynamic characteristics are strongly influenced by this sideways flow.

The rearward sweep angle lowers the airspeed normal to the leading edge of the wing, thereby allowing the aircraft to fly at high subsonic, transonic, or supersonic speed, while the subsonic lifting characteristics of the airflow over the wing are maintained.

Within this flight regime, drooping the leading edge within the shock cone increases lift, but not drag to any significant extent. Such conical leading edge droop was introduced on the production Convair F-102A Delta Dagger at the same time that the prototype design was reworked to include area-ruling. It also appeared on Convair's next two deltas, the F-106 Delta Dart and B-58 Hustler.

==== High-speed supersonic waveriding ====
At high supersonic speeds, the shock cone from the leading edge root angles further back to lie along the wing surface behind the leading edge. It is no longer possible for the sideways flow to occur and the aerodynamic characteristics change considerably. It is in this flight regime that the waverider design, as used on the North American XB-70 Valkyrie, becomes practicable. Here, a shock body beneath the wing creates an attached shockwave and the high pressure associated with the wave provides significant lift without increasing drag.

== Design variations ==
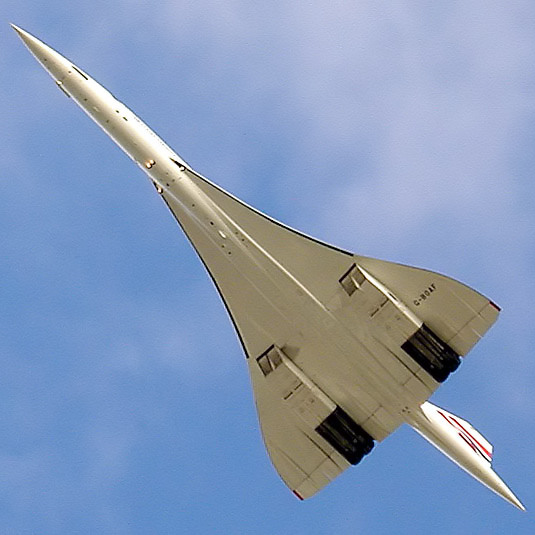
Aérospatiale-BAC Concorde shows off its ogee wing.

Variants of the delta wing plan offer improvements to the basic configuration.

Cropped delta – tip is cut off. This helps maintain lift outboard and reduce wingtip flow separation (stalling) at high angles of attack. Most deltas are cropped to at least some degree.

In the compound delta, double delta or cranked arrow, the leading edge is not straight. Typically the inboard section has increased sweepback, creating a controlled high-lift vortex without the need for a foreplane. Examples include the Saab Draken fighter, the experimental General Dynamics F-16XL, and the Hawker Siddeley HS. 138 VTOL concept. The ogee delta (or ogival delta) used on the Anglo-French Concorde supersonic airliner is similar, but with the two sections and cropped wingtip merged into a smooth ogee curve.

Tailless delta	Cropped delta	Compound delta	Cranked arrow	Ogival delta	Tailed delta

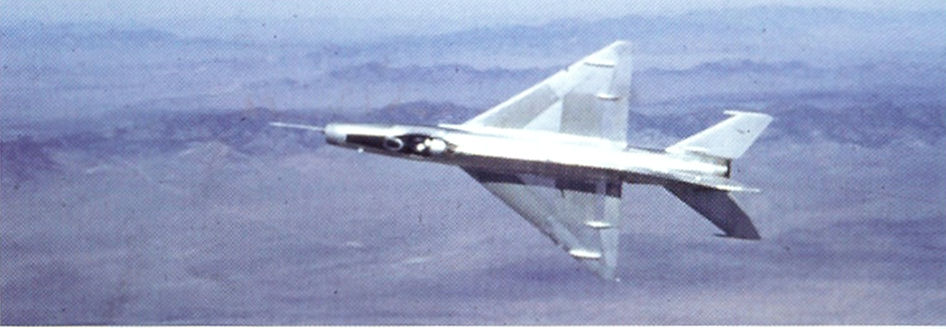
The MiG-21 was a very effective fighter with its famous tailed delta silhouette.

Tailed delta – adds a conventional tailplane (with horizontal tail surfaces), to improve handling. Common on Soviet types such as the Mikoyan-Gurevich MiG-21.

Canard delta – Many modern fighter aircraft, such as the JAS 39 Gripen, the Eurofighter Typhoon and the Dassault Rafale use a combination of canard foreplanes and a delta wing.

=== Tailless delta ===
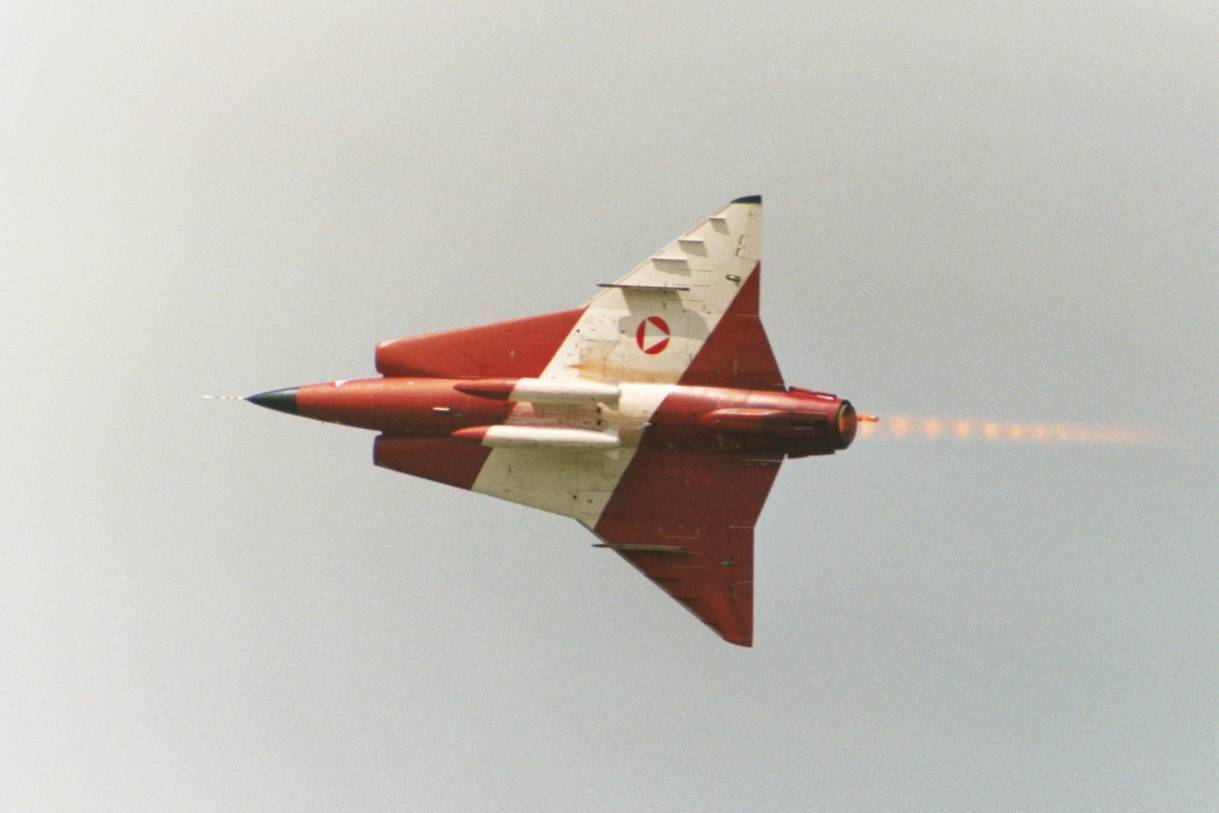
The Saab 35 Draken was a successful tailless double-delta design.

Like other tailless aircraft, the tailless delta wing is not suited to high wing loadings and requires a large wing area for a given aircraft weight. The most efficient aerofoils are unstable in pitch and the tailless type must use a less efficient design and therefore a bigger wing. Techniques used include:

- Using a less efficient aerofoil which is inherently stable, such as a symmetrical form with zero camber, or even reflex camber near the trailing edge,
- Using the rear part of the wing as a lightly- or even negatively-loaded horizontal stabiliser:
  - Twisting the outer leading edge down to reduce the incidence of the wing tip, which is behind the main centre of lift. This also improves stall characteristics and can benefit supersonic cruise in other ways.
  - Moving the centre of mass forwards and trimming the elevator to exert a balancing downforce. In the extreme, this reduces the craft's ability to pitch its nose up for takeoff and landing.

The main advantages of the tailless delta are structural simplicity and light weight, combined with low aerodynamic drag. These properties helped to make the Dassault Mirage III one of the most widely manufactured supersonic fighters of all time.

=== Tailed delta ===
A conventional tail stabiliser allows the main wing to be optimised for lift and therefore to be smaller and more highly loaded. Development of aircraft equipped with this configuration can be traced back to the late 1940s.

When used with a T-tail, as in the Gloster Javelin, like other wings a delta wing can give rise to a "deep stall" in which the high angle of attack at the stall causes the turbulent wake of the stalled wing to envelope the tail. This makes the elevator ineffective and the airplane cannot recover from the stall. In the case of the Javelin, a stall warning device was developed and implemented for the Javelin following the early loss of an aircraft to such conditions. Gloster's design team had reportedly opted to use a tailed delta configuration out of necessity, seeking to achieve effective manoeuvrability at relatively high speeds for the era while also requiring suitable controllability when being flown at the slower landing speeds desired.

=== Canard delta ===
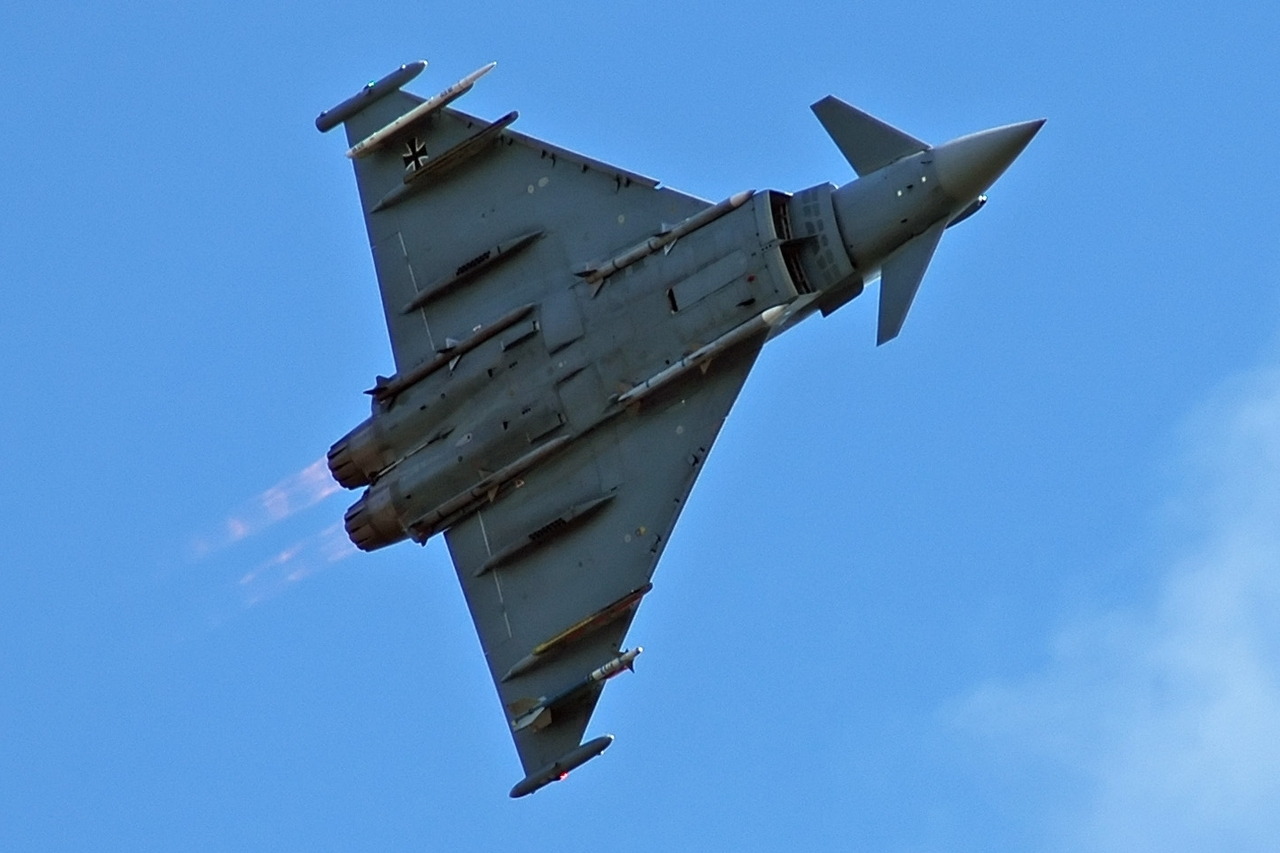
The Eurofighter Typhoon has a canard delta wing configuration.

A lifting-canard delta can offer a smaller shift in the center of lift with increasing Mach number compared to a conventional tail configuration.

An unloaded or free-floating canard can allow a safe recovery from a high angle of attack. Depending on its design, a canard surface may increase or decrease longitudinal stability of the aircraft.

A canard delta foreplane creates its own trailing vortex. If this vortex interferes with the vortex of the main delta wing, this can adversely affect the airflow over the wing and cause unwanted and even dangerous behaviour. In the close-coupled configuration, the canard vortex couples with the main vortex to enhance its benefits and maintain controlled airflow through a wide range of speeds and angles of attack. This allows both improved manoeuvrability and lower stalling speeds, but the presence of the foreplane can increase drag at supersonic speeds and hence reduce the aircraft's maximum speed.

== History ==
=== Early research ===
Triangular stabilizing fins for rockets were described as early as 1529-1556 by the Austrian military engineer Conrad Haas and in the 17th century by the Polish-Lithuanian military engineer Kazimierz Siemienowicz. However, a true lifting wing in delta form did not appear until 1867, when it was patented by J.W. Butler and E. Edwards in a design for a low-aspect-ratio, dart-shaped rocket-propelled aeroplane. This was followed by various similarly dart-shaped proposals, such as a biplane version by Butler and Edwards, and a jet-propelled version by the Russian Nicholas de Telescheff. In 1909 a variant with a canard foreplane was experimented with by the Spanish sculptor Ricardo Causarás.

Also in 1909, British aeronautical pioneer J. W. Dunne patented his tailless stable aircraft with conical wing development. The patent included a broad-span biconical delta, with each side bulging upwards towards the rear in a manner characteristic of the modern Rogallo wing. During the following year, in America U. G. Lee and W. A. Darrah patented a similar biconical delta winged aeroplane with an explicitly rigid wing. It also incorporated a proposal for a flight control system and covered both gliding and powered flight. None of these early designs is known to have successfully flown although, in 1904, Lavezzani's hang glider featuring independent left and right triangular wings had left the ground, and Dunne's other tailless swept designs based on the same principle would fly.

The practical delta wing was pioneered by German aeronautical designer Alexander Lippisch in the 1930s, using a thick cantilever wing without any tail. His first such designs, for which he coined the name "Delta", used a very gentle angle so that the wing appeared almost straight and the wing tips had to be cropped sharply (see below). His first such delta flew in 1931, followed by four successively improved examples. These prototypes were not easy to handle at low speed and none saw widespread use.

=== Subsonic thick wing ===
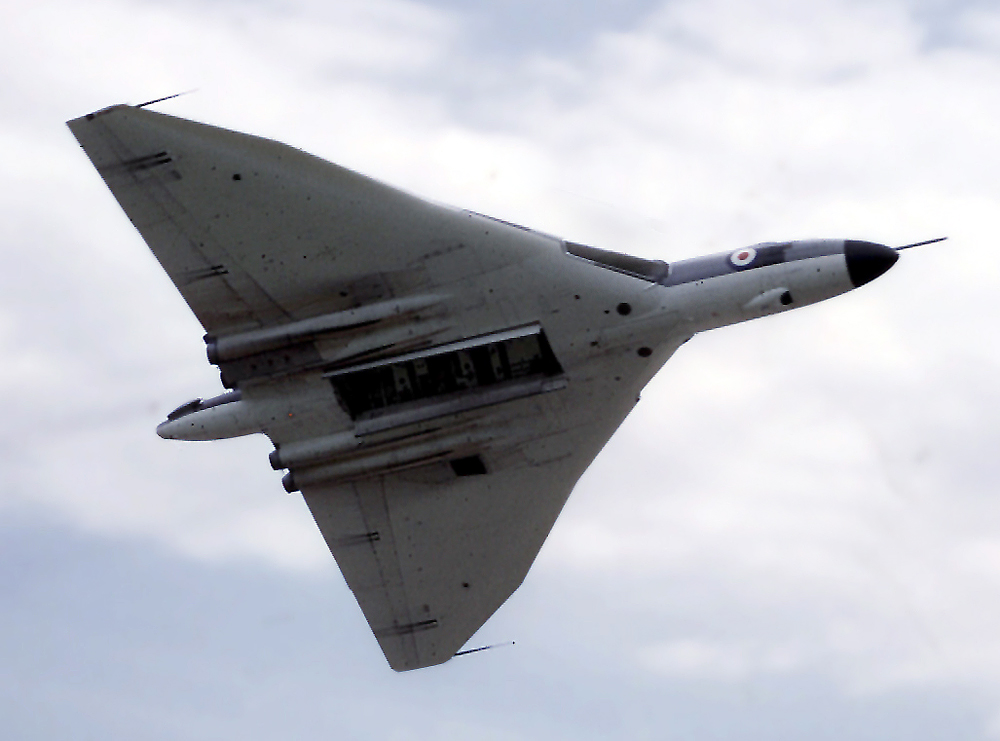
The Avro Vulcan bomber had a thick wing.

During the latter years of World War II, Alexander Lippisch refined his ideas on the high-speed delta, substantially increasing the sweepback of the wing's leading edge. An experimental glider, the DM-1, was built to test the aerodynamics of the proposed P.13a high-speed interceptor. Following the end of hostilities, the DM-1 was completed on behalf of the United States and the shipped to Langley Field in Virginia for examination by NACA (National Advisory Committee for Aeronautics, forerunner of today's NASA) It underwent significant alterations in the US, typically to lower its drag, resulting in the replacement of its large vertical stabilizer with a smaller and more conventional counterpart, along with a normal cockpit canopy taken from a Lockheed P-80 Shooting Star.

The work of French designer Nicolas Roland Payen somewhat paralleled that of Lippisch. During the 1930s, he had developed a tandem delta configuration with a straight fore wing and steep delta aft wing, similar to that of Causarás. The outbreak of the Second World War brought a halt to flight testing of the Pa-22, although work continued for a time after the project garnered German attention. During the postwar era, Payen flew an experimental tailless delta jet, the Pa.49, in 1954, as well as the tailless pusher-configuration Arbalète series from 1965. Further derivatives based on Payen's work were proposed but ultimately went undeveloped.

Following the war, the British developed a number of subsonic jet aircraft that harnessed data gathered from Lippisch's work. One such aircraft, the Avro 707 research aircraft, made its first flight in 1949. British military aircraft such as the Avro Vulcan (a strategic bomber) and Gloster Javelin (an all-weather fighter) were among the first delta-equipped aircraft to enter production. Whereas the Vulcan was a classic tailless design, the Javelin incorporated a tailplane in order to improve low-speed handling and high-speed manoeuvrability, as well as to allow a greater centre of gravity range. Gloster proposed a refinement of the Javelin that would have, amongst other changes, decreased wing thickness in order to achieve supersonic speeds of up to Mach 1.6.

=== Supersonic thin wing ===
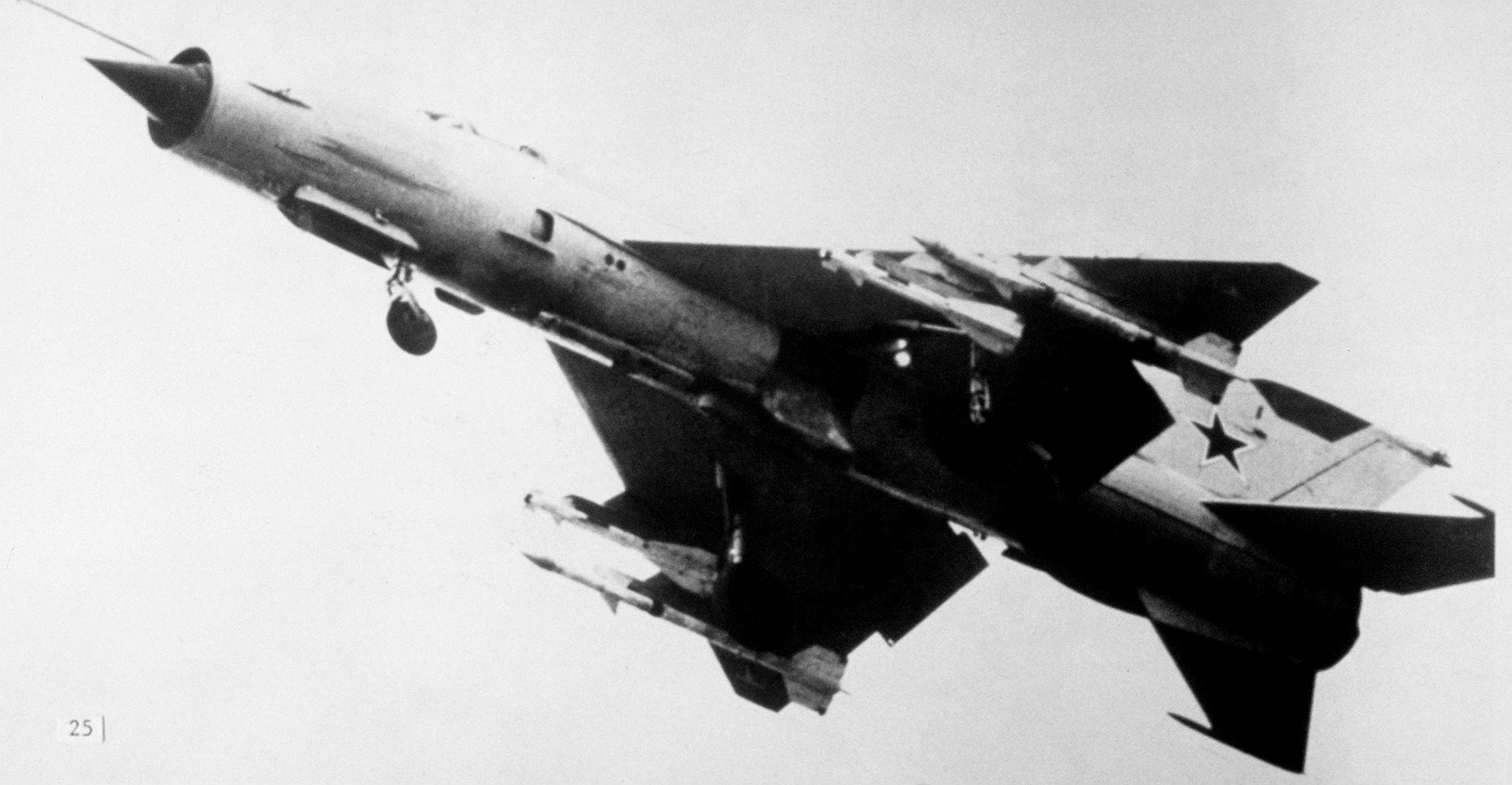
The MiG-21 fighter had a conventional tail.

The American aerodynamicist Robert T. Jones, who worked at NACA during the Second World War, developed the theory of the thin delta wing for supersonic flight. First published in January 1945, his approach contrasted with that of Lippisch on thick delta wings. The thin delta wing first flew on the Convair XF-92 in 1948, making it the first delta-winged jet plane to fly. It provided a successful basis for all practical supersonic deltas and the configuration became widely adopted.

During the late 1940s, the British aircraft manufacturer Fairey Aviation became interested in the delta wing, its proposals led to the experimental Fairey Delta 1 being produced to Air Ministry Specification E.10/47. A subsequent experimental aircraft, the Fairey Delta 2 set a new World air speed record on 10 March 1956, achieving 1,132 mph (1,811 km/h) or Mach 1.73. This raised the record above 1,000 mph for the first time and broke the previous record by 310 mph, or 37 per cent; never before had the record been raised by such a large margin.

In its original tailless form, the thin delta was used extensively by the American aviation company Convair and by the French aircraft manufacturer Dassault Aviation. The supersonic Convair F-102 Delta Dagger and transonic Douglas F4D Skyray were two of the first operational jet fighters to feature a tailless delta wing when they entered service in 1956. Dassault's interest in the delta wing produced the Dassault Mirage family of combat aircraft, especially the highly successful Mirage III. Amongst other attributes, the Mirage III was the first Western European combat aircraft to exceed Mach 2 in horizontal flight.

The tailed delta configuration was adopted by the TsAGI (Central Aero and Hydrodynamic Institute, Moscow), to improve high angle-of-attack handling, manoeuvrability and centre of gravity range over a pure delta planform. The resulting TsAGI S-12 airfoil was used in the Mikoyan-Gurevich MiG-21 ("Fishbed"), which became the most widely built combat aircraft of the 1970s.

=== Close-coupled canard ===
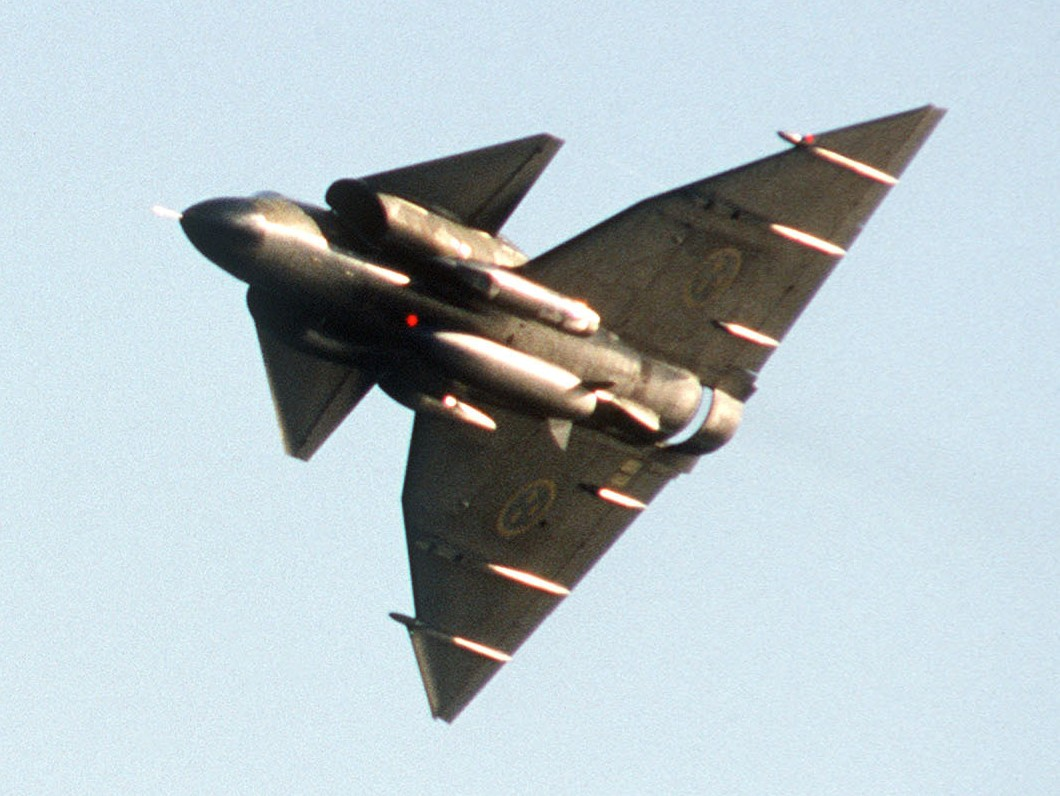
The Saab Viggen pioneered the close-coupled canard.

Through the 1960s, the Swedish aircraft manufacturer Saab AB developed a close-coupled canard delta configuration, placing a delta foreplane just in front of and above the main delta wing. Patented in 1963, this configuration was flown for the first time on the company's Viggen combat aircraft in 1967. The close coupling modifies the airflow over the wing, most significantly when flying at high angles of attack. In contrast to the classic tail-mounted elevators, the canards add to the total lift as well as stabilising the airflow over the main wing. This enables more extreme manoeuvres, improves low-speed handling and reduces the takeoff run and landing speed. During the 1960s, this configuration was considered to be radical, but Saab's design team judged that it was the optimal approach available for satisfying the conflicting performance demands for the Viggen, which including favourable STOL performance, supersonic speed, low turbulence sensitivity during low level flight, and efficient lift for subsonic flight.

The close-coupled canard has since become common on supersonic fighter aircraft. Notable examples include the multinational Eurofighter Typhoon, France's Dassault Rafale, Saab's own Gripen (a successor to the Viggen) and Israel's IAI Kfir. One of the main reasons for its popularity has been the high level of agility in manoeuvring that it is capable of.

=== Supersonic transport ===
When supersonic transport (SST) aircraft were developed, the tailless ogival delta wing was chosen for both the Anglo-French Concorde and the Soviet Tupolev Tu-144, the Concorde beginning test flights in 1965 and the Tupolev first flying in 1968. While both Concorde and the Tu-144 prototype featured an ogival delta configuration, production models of the Tu-144 differed by changing to a double delta wing. The delta wings required these airliners to adopt a higher angle of attack at low speeds than conventional aircraft; in the case of Concorde, lift was maintained by allowed the formation of large low pressure vortices over the entire upper wing surface. Its typical landing speed was 170 miles per hour (274 km/h), considerably higher than subsonic airliners. Multiple proposed successors, such as the Zero Emission Hyper Sonic Transport ZEHST), have reportedly adopted a similar configuration to that Concorde's basic design, thus the Delta wing remains a likely candidate for future supersonic civil endeavours.

=== Rogallo flexible wing ===
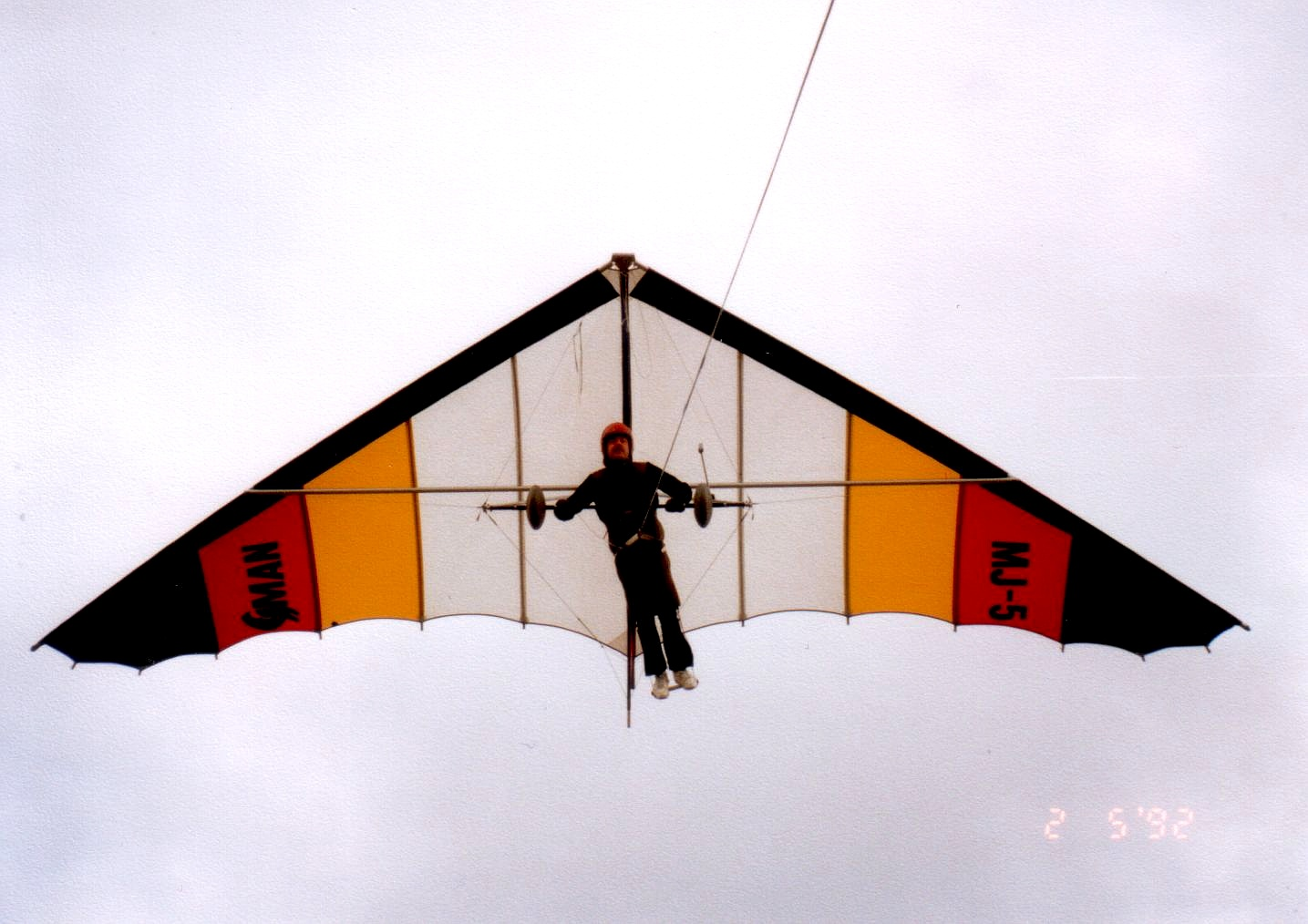
This hang glider is a relatively broad-span and lightly swept Rogallo delta.

During and after WWII, Francis and Gertrude Rogallo developed the idea of a flexible wing which could be collapsed for storage. Francis saw an application in spacecraft recovery and NASA became interested. In 1961, Ryan flew the XV-8, an experimental "flying Jeep" or "fleep". The flexible wing chosen for it was a delta wing; in use, it billowed out into a double-cone profile which gave it aerodynamic stability. Although tested but ultimately never used for spacecraft recovery, this design soon became popular for hang gliders and ultra-light aircraft and has become known as the Rogallo wing.

== See also ==
- List of delta-wing aircraft
- Hermann Behrbohm
- Bertil Dillner
- Swept wing
- Flying wing
- Tailless aircraft
