= Avión Torpedo =

1902 Peruvian rocket aircraft project

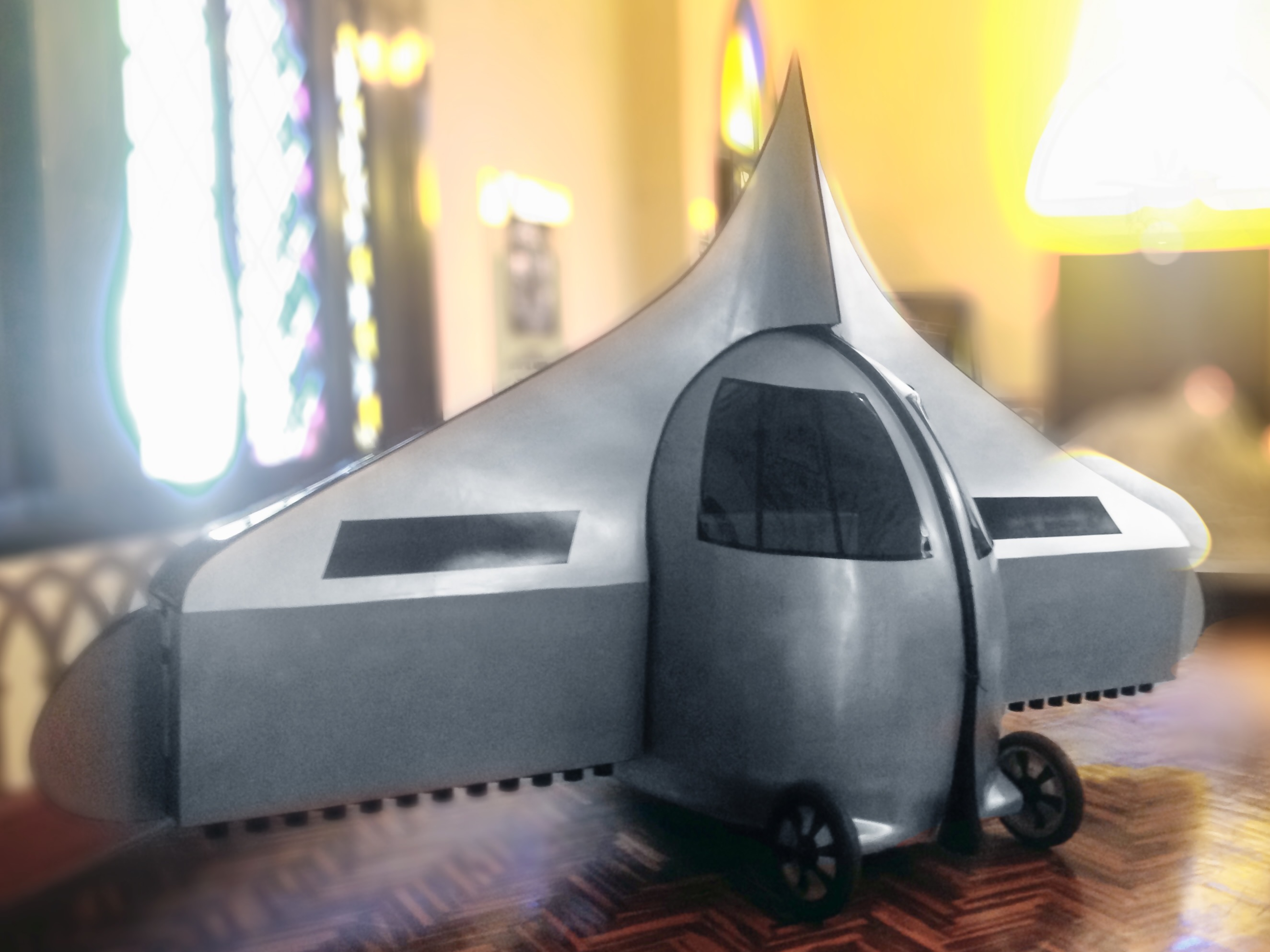
- Replica of Pedro Paulet's Avión Torpedo of 1902

General information
- Type: Liquid-propelled rocket-powered aircraft
- National origin: Peru
- Designer: Pedro Paulet
- Status: Project only
- Number built: 0

The Avión Torpedo was a liquid-propelled rocket-powered aircraft project designed by Pedro Paulet in 1902. Paulet would spend decades attempting to achieve funding for the project throughout Europe and Latin America, but found no donors.

== Design and development ==
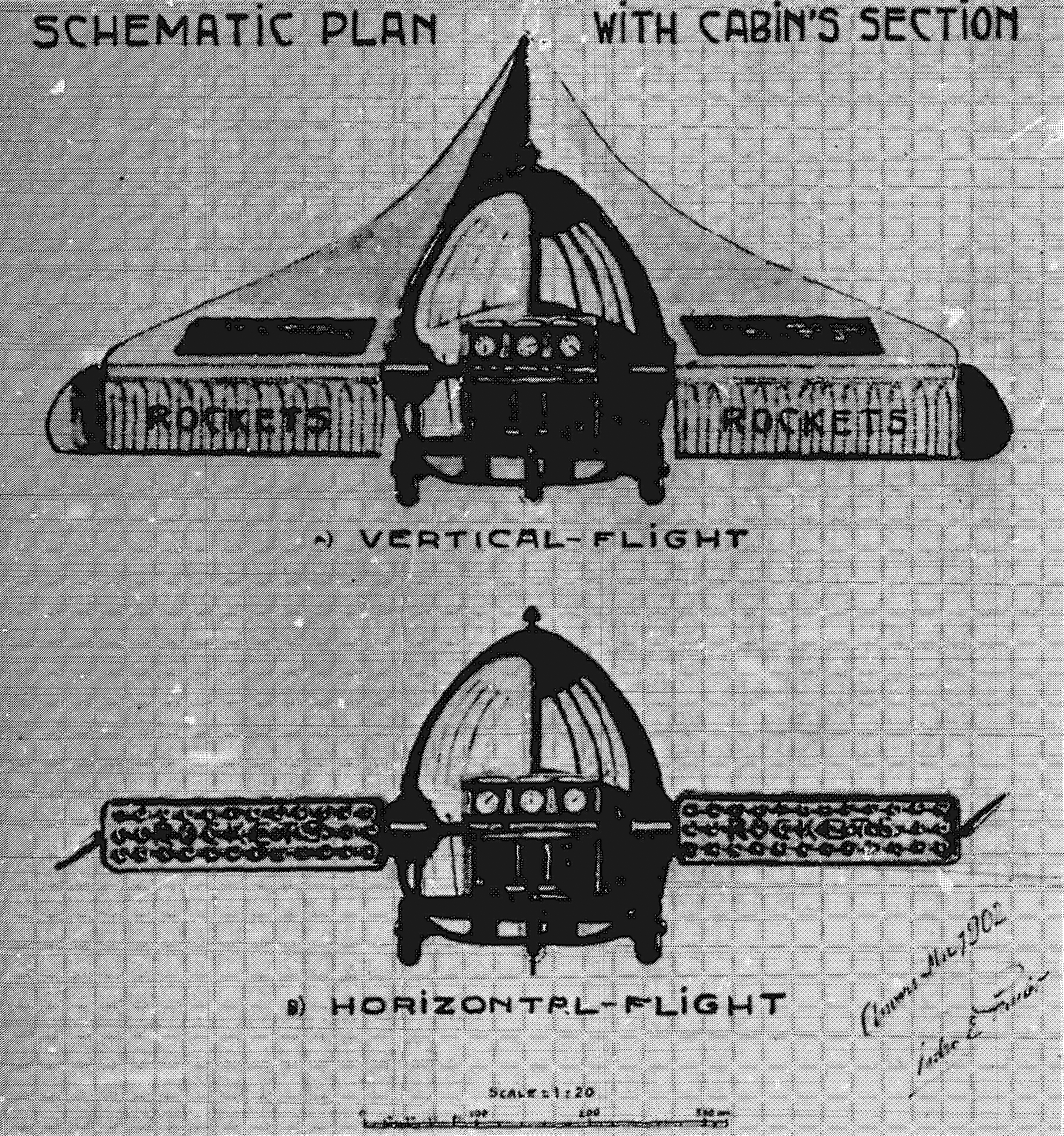
Paulet Avion-Torpedo schematic

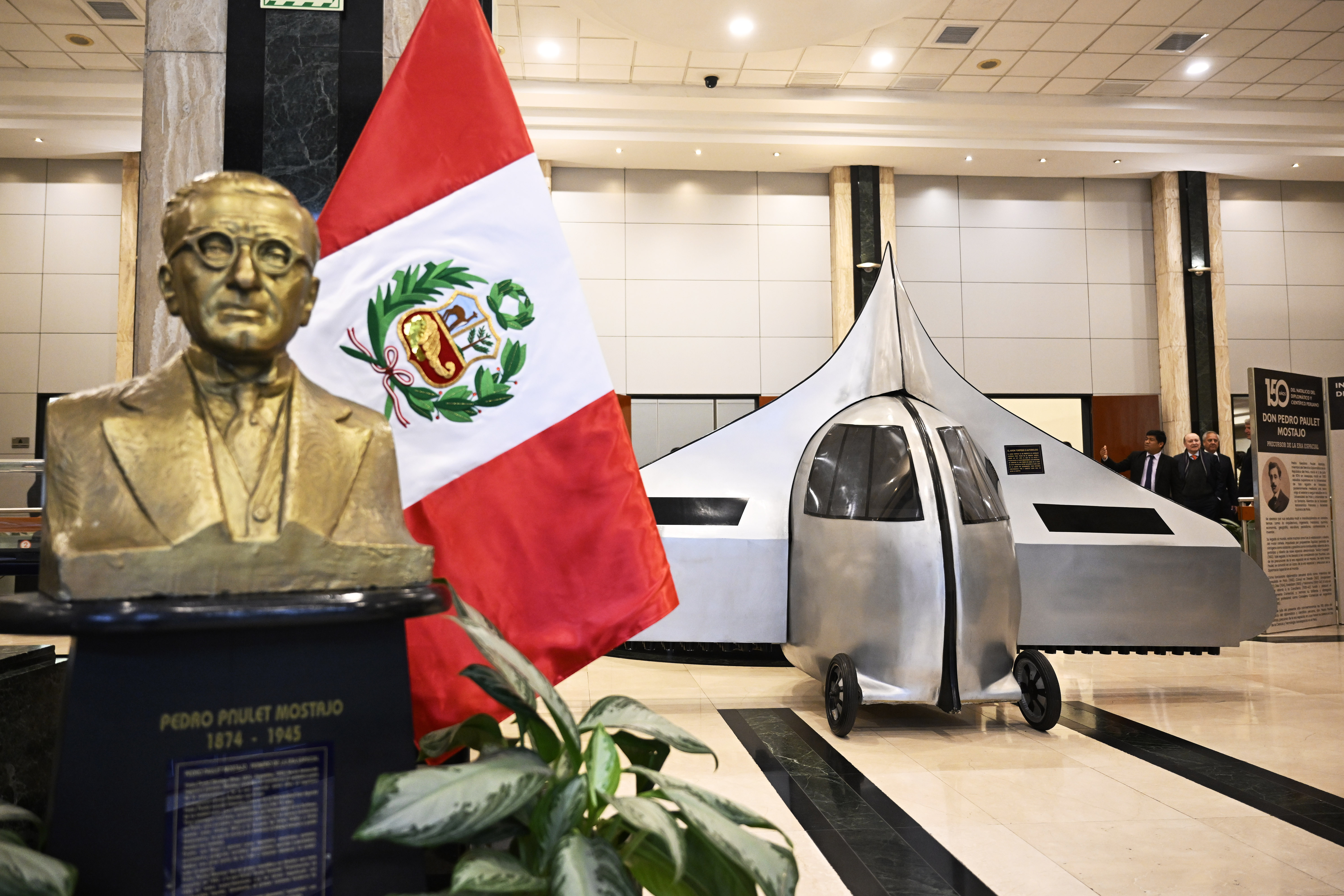
150th anniversary of the birth of Pedro Paulet Mostajo, prominent Peruvian diplomat and scientist. Note the Avion-Torpedo on display

Peruvian Pedro Paulet developed a liquid-propellant rocket engine in 1895. In 1902, he designed the Avión Torpedo, a liquid-propellant rocket-powered aircraft that featured a canopy fixed to a delta tiltwing. Paulet's concept of using liquid-propellant was decades ahead of rocket engineers at the time who utilized black powder as a propellant.

== In popular culture ==
- The Avión Torpedo was featured in a Google Doodle to commemorate the birthday of Pedro Paulet in 2011

== See also ==
- List of rocket aircraft
- List of delta-wing aircraft
- List of VTOL aircraft
- PTOL
- Blown flap
