= AP10 =

AP10 may refer to:

== Transportation and vehicles ==
- Payen AP.10, a single-seat monoplane
- AP-10 (Advanced Project 10), company designation of the Republic P-47 Thunderbolt
- Toyota Porte (AP10), a 2000s Japanese mini-MPV, AP10 being the first generation of the Porte
- USS McCawley (AP-10), a WWII U.S. Navy McCawley-class attack transport

== Other uses ==
- IBS AP10 coprocessor card; see Apple II processor cards
- Yersinia virus AP10; see List of virus species

== See also ==
- APX (disambiguation)
- AP (disambiguation)
- 10 (disambiguation)
