= Payen Pa.101 =

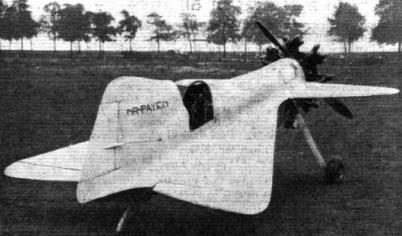

General information
- Type: Experimental aircraft
- National origin: France
- Manufacturer: Nicolas Roland Payen
- Number built: 1

History
- First flight: 17 April 1935

The Payen Pa.101 was an experimental aircraft designed by Nicolas Roland Payen in the 1930s.

== Design ==
The Pa.101 was quite unorthodox for employing a combination of a delta wing and canard surfaces, given that the delta wing was in its developmental infancy.

== Specifications ==
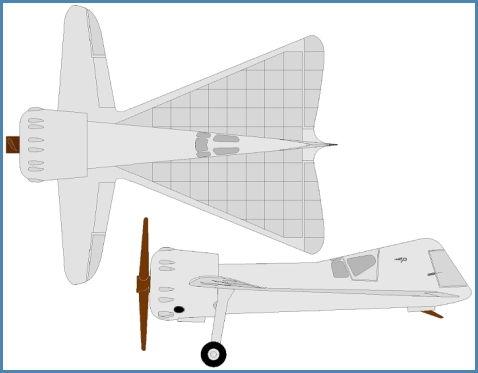
3-view drawing

Data from

General characteristics

- Crew: 1
- Length: 5.75 m (18 ft 10 in)
- Wingspan: 4.20 m (13 ft 9 in)
- Height: 2.60 m (8 ft 6 in)
- Gross weight: 750 kg (1,653 lb)
- Powerplant: 1 × Gnome & Rhône 7Kd 7-cyl. air-cooled radial piston engine, 280 kW (380 hp)

Performance

- Maximum speed: 360 km/h (220 mph, 190 kn)
- Cruise speed: 330 km/h (205 mph, 178 kn) landing speed 47 mph
- Range: 1,200 km (750 mi, 650 nmi)
- Service ceiling: 5,600 m (18,500 ft)

== Bibliography ==
- Pelletier, Alain J. (March–April 1997). "Paper Darts to Deltas: The Designs of Roland Payen". Air Enthusiast. No. 68. pp. 33–44. ISSN 0143-5450.
- Roux, Robert J. (November 1969). "Les avions Payen" [The Payen Aircraft]. Le album de fanatique de l'Aviation (in French) (5): 2–6. ISSN 0757-4169.
