= Payen Pa.47 =

Pa.47 Plein Air

General information
- Type: Two seat touring aircraft
- National origin: France
- Manufacturer: Ets Payen aviation
- Designer: Roland Payen
- Number built: 1

History
- First flight: 18 June 1949
- Retired: 1962

The Payen Pa.47 Plein Air (English: Open Air) or Week End was a French two seat, high wing single engine tourer, which first flew in 1949. Only one was built.

== Design and development ==
Most of Roland Payen's aircraft were tailless designs but the Plein Air was strikingly conventional. It was a strut-braced high wing monoplane, seating two side-by-side in a cabin under the wing leading edge and powered by a 48 kW (65 hp) Continental A65 air-cooled flat-four engine. The wings were rectangular in plan and the lift struts were V-form pairs from the lower fuselage.

The Plein Air had a flat sided fuselage which tapered to the tail. This was conventional, with a straight edged fin and rudder with a rounded top. Its tailplane was strut braced to the fin. The tourer had a fixed tail wheel undercarriage with main wheels on split axles mounted on the central fuselage underside; the legs were faired-in V-struts from the lower fuselage. The tail wheel, mounted on a telescopic leg, was also faired.

Its first flight was on 18 June 1949 but it did not receive its Certificate of Airworthiness (C of A) until 24 August 1957. Initially registered with Payen, it changed hands in July 1960 but its C of A ran out in July 1962 and was not renewed.

== Specifications ==
Data from Gaillard (1990)

General characteristics

- Capacity: Two
- Length: 6.35 m (20 ft 10 in)
- Wingspan: 9.40 m (30 ft 10 in)
- Height: 2.20 m (7 ft 3 in)
- Empty weight: 371 kg (818 lb)
- Gross weight: 608 kg (1,340 lb)
- Powerplant: 1 × Continental A65 air-cooled flat-four, 48 kW (65 hp)
- Propellers: 2-bladed

Performance

- Maximum speed: 170 km/h (110 mph, 92 kn)

== Bibliography ==
- Pelletier, Alain J. (March–April 1997). "Paper Darts to Deltas: The Designs of Roland Payen". Air Enthusiast. No. 68. pp. 33–44. ISSN 0143-5450.
- Roux, Robert J. (December 1969). "Le dossier de l'aventure (1): Les Avion Payen (2)". Le Fana de l'Aviation (in French). No. 6. pp. 2–6.
