= Nicolas Roland Payen =

French aeronautical engineer (1914-2004)

Nicolas Roland Payen (2 February 1914 in Athis-Mons, France – 8 December 2004) was a French aeronautical engineer. He has been described as the originator of the delta wing.

== Biography ==
In 1929, Roland Payen founded the light aviation sports association Les Goélands in Athis-Mons, where he built his first aircraft: a German single-beam glider Zögling. On 13 November 1931, together with Robert Sauvage, he filed a patent for an aircraft with a delta wing design, named the Avion Autoplan. He also build several prototypes to demonstrate the advantages of this type of wing. Among his creations was the Pa-49, the world’s smallest delta-wing jet aircraft, which first flew in December 1953. The Pa-49 is now preserved at the Musée de l’air et de l’espace in France. In the 1950s, Payen founded the association Les Amis du Château féodal de Montlhéry, dedicated to the preservation of the Montlhéry castle. In the 1970s, he turned his attention to the castle in Marcoussis, a project he continued into the 1990s until he was succeeded by the Association Historique de Marcoussis (AHM), of which he remained an honorary president and member until his death. During his retirement, Payen devoted himself to building and restoring historic models preserved by the Amicale Jean-Baptiste Salis. He also founded the association Athis-Paray, which established the Delta Museum to save several historic aircraft, including delta-wing models, from destruction. Many of his creations are on display there.

== See also ==
- Payen Pa.101, a French experimental aircraft, first flown in 1935
- Payen AP.10, a French experimental aircraft, first flown in 1936
- Payen PA-22, a French experimental aircraft, first flown in 1942
- Payen Pa.47, a French two seat, high wing single engine tourer, which first flew in 1949
- Payen Pa 49, a small experimental French turbojet powered tailless aircraft, first flown in 1954
- Payen Arbalète, a small, pusher configuration, experimental French tailless aircraft, first flown in 1965

== Bibliography ==
- Pelletier, Alain J. (March–April 1997). "Paper Darts to Deltas: The Designs of Roland Payen". Air Enthusiast. No. 68. pp. 33–44. ISSN 0143-5450.
