= Payen Arbalète =

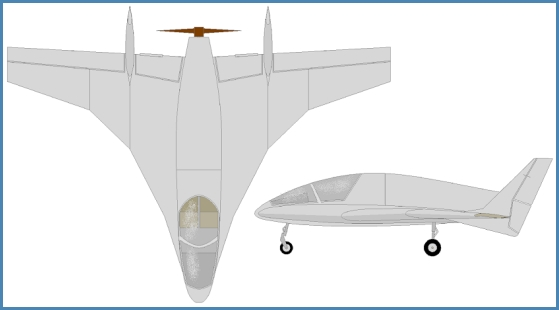
- A 2-vue of the Pa.61

General information
- Type: Experimental aircraft
- National origin: France
- Manufacturer: Fléchair SA
- Designer: Nicolas Roland Payen
- Number built: 2

History
- First flight: 5 June 1965

The Payen Arbalète (English: Crossbow) was a small, pusher configuration, experimental French tailless aircraft, designed by Nicolas Roland Payen, and first flown in 1965.

== Design and development ==
Though there were significant changes during its development, the Arbalète's basic, unusual configuration remained unaltered. It was a low wing cantilever monoplane resembling a cropped double delta in plan, with a short fuselage ending at the pusher engine and propeller. The centre section of the wing was strongly swept and of very broad chord, extending from the engine to the cockpit. Swept fins were placed at the outer end of the centre section and beyond them the wings were much less strongly swept, with blunt tips. The Arbalète had a fixed tricycle undercarriage.

The first version of the Arbalète was the Pa.60 which made its first flight on 5 June 1965. It was powered by a 105 hp (78 kW) Hirth HM 504 air-cooled, four cylinder, inverted inline engine, which was totally enclosed within the flat sided fuselage with no side-scoops for cooling air, an arrangement which led to overheating. Its swept, straight edged fins were placed with their leading edges on the wing leading edges; they extended beyond the wing trailing edge via rounded tips to rudders with swept, curved trailing edges and trim tabs. The two side-by-side seats were enclosed by a long, wide two piece canopy. The main undercarriage legs of the Pa.60 Arbalète were located near the wing leading edge, immediately under the fins.

After the cooling problems and some issues concerning the undercarriage had been resolved, the same aircraft flew as the Pa.61B Arbalète but proved to be underpowered with the Hirth engine. As a result, a new machine, the Pa.61F Arbalète II, was built, powered by a 180 hp (134 kW) Lycoming O-360 air-cooled flat-four engine with side air intakes on the semi-monocoque, circular cross-section fuselage. The Arbalète II's cockpit was large enough to hold three. The mid-span fins were different, slightly straight tapered, mounted on the trailing edge and extending below it. Below the rudders they carried airbrakes. The slight sweep on the centre wing section trailing edge has led to a description of the wing plan as "crescent" rather than delta. A narrow continuation of the leading edge of the wing to the nose formed strakes on each side. There were control surfaces on the trailing edges both within and beyond the fins. The Arbalète II's main undercarriage legs were moved inboard, mounted on the wing but close to the fuselage.

The Arbalète II flew for the first time on 5 August 1970. The flight was satisfactory up to an over fast landing, when it was damaged. It was rebuilt but its subsequent history is obscure. Several proposed developments were abandoned.

== Variants ==
Pa.60 Arbalète
78 kW (105 hp) Hirth HM 504 engine.
Pa.61B Arbalète
Improved engine cooling and landing gear.
Pa.61F Arbalète II
134 kW (180 hp) Lycoming O-360 engine. Other changes described above.
Pa.61G Arbalète II
Proposed version, similar to Pa.61F but with retractable foreplanes instead of rudder airbrakes and forward fuselage strakes.
Pa.61H Arbalète II
Proposed twin 160 kg (353 lb) Turbomeca Palas turbojet version, otherwise like Pa.61F but without strakes.
Pa.610 Arbalète III
Proposed four seat version with retractable gear and 149 kW (200 hp) engine.

== Specifications (Pa.61F Arbalète II) ==
Data from Jane's All the World's Aircraft 1973-74, pp.75-6. Performance figures are estimates at maximum take-off weight.

General characteristics

- Crew: Two or three
- Length: 6.20 m (20 ft 4 in)
- Wingspan: 8.25 m (27 ft 1 in)
- Height: 2.35 m (7 ft 9 in)
- Wing area: 15.00 m^{2} (161.5 sq ft)
- Empty weight: 500 kg (1,102 lb)
- Max takeoff weight: 960 kg (2,116 lb)
- Powerplant: 1 × Lycoming O-360 air-cooled flat-four, 130 kW (180 hp)
- Propellers: 2-bladed

Performance

- Maximum speed: 330 km/h (210 mph, 180 kn)
- Cruise speed: 300 km/h (190 mph, 160 kn)
- Range: 900 km (560 mi, 490 nmi)
- Take-off run: 200 m (656 ft)
- Landing speed: 115 km/h (71 mph; 62 kn)
- Landing run: 265 m (869 ft)

== Bibliography ==
- Pelletier, Alain J. (March–April 1997). "Paper Darts to Deltas: The Designs of Roland Payen". Air Enthusiast. No. 68. pp. 33–44. ISSN 0143-5450.
- Roux, Robert J. (January 1970). "Les avions Payen (3)" [Payen Aircraft, Part 3]. Le album de fanatique de l'Aviation (in French) (7): 2–4. ISSN 0757-4169.
