= Lotus APX =

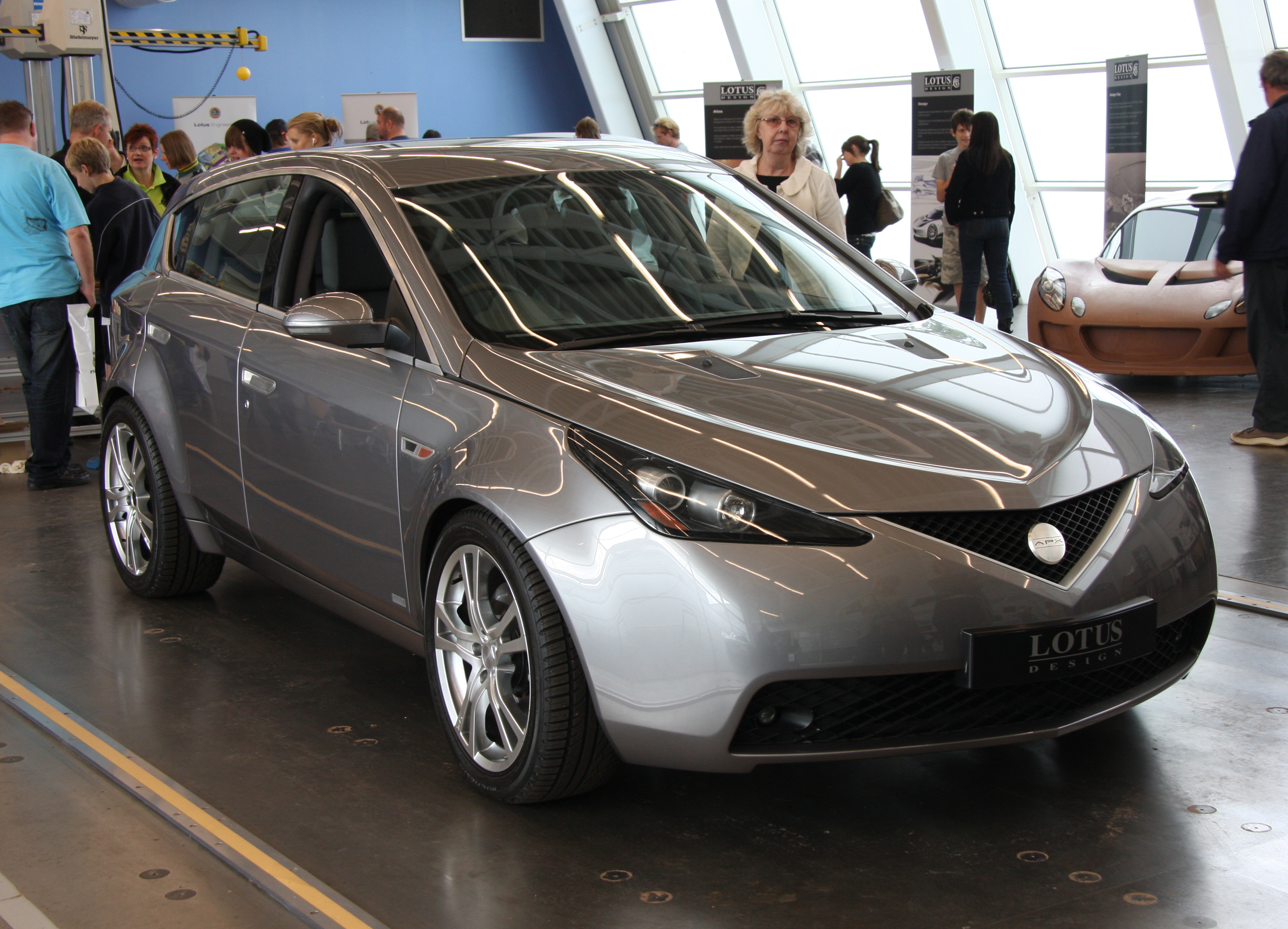

Overview
- Manufacturer: Lotus Cars
- Model years: 2006

Body and chassis
- Body style: crossover

The Lotus APX (standing for Aluminium Performance Crossover) is a concept car created by the British sports car marque, Lotus. It was first introduced at the 2006 Geneva Motor Show, and was also displayed as the Proton MSX. It is the first complete vehicle built on the new Versatile Vehicle Architecture (VVA). This vehicle is also a first for Lotus, as it is the first crossover SUV they have ever built. It was to have entered production as the Youngman Lotus T5, but was cancelled.

== Engine ==
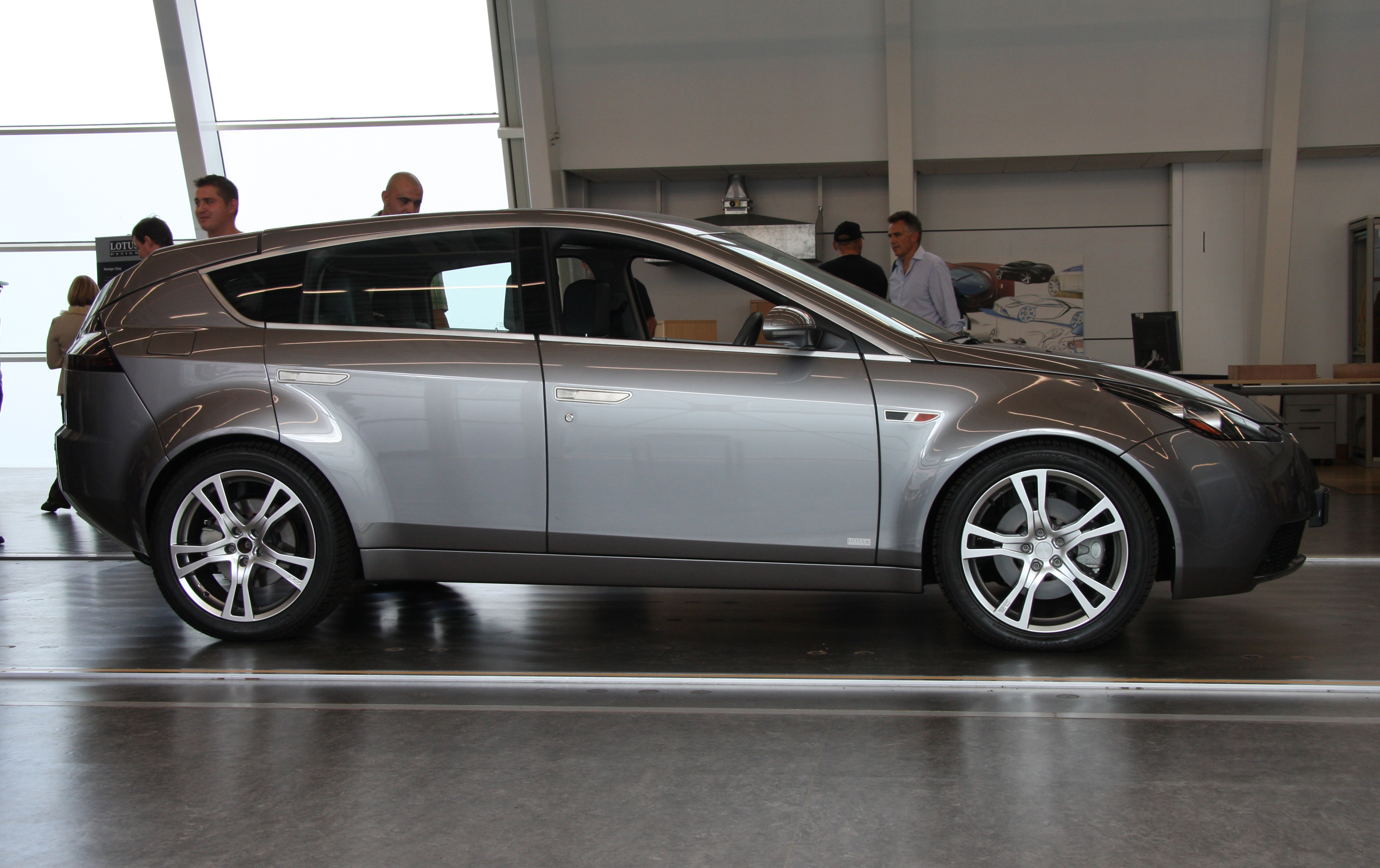
Side view

The APX uses a 3.0 litre supercharged V6 engine, designed and developed by Lotus. The power output of this engine is 300 hp (224 kW) at 6250 rpm with a torque of 360 N⋅m (266 lb⋅ft) at 4500 rpm. It can go from 0–60 mph (97 km/h) in 5 seconds. The APX's top speed is 152 mph (245 km/h). The suspension of the APX makes it perfect for off-road use (another first for the Lotus brand) with its permanent four wheel drive. The combined fuel consumption is estimated to be around 8.7 L/100 km (32 mpg_{‑imp}; 27 mpg_{‑US}).

Also shown at the NADA 2007 show was an all-electric version of the APX, also four wheel drive, with a 0–60 mph acceleration time of 4.8 seconds. The licensing distributor, ZAP, states it has a capacity of up to 324 wheel horsepower, up to 350-mile (563 km) range, recharge in as little as 10 minutes, and a top speed of up to 155 mph (249 km/h). They claim up to 9,000 recharge cycles and 1 penny per mile recharge costs.

== Design ==
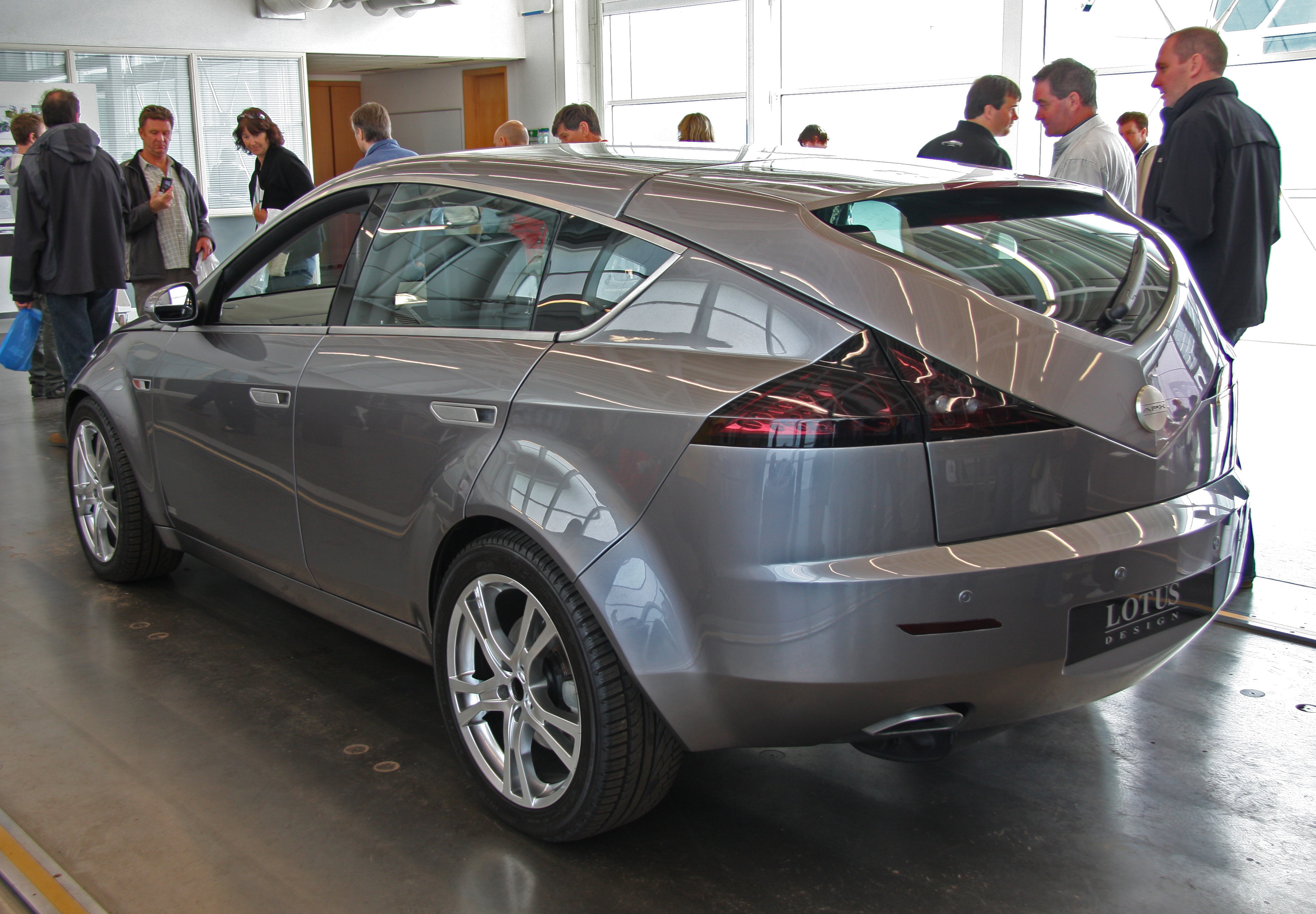
Rear view

The exterior of the APX is all-aluminium. The interior features digital screens, futuristic gadgets and many buttons.
