= Payen AP.10 =

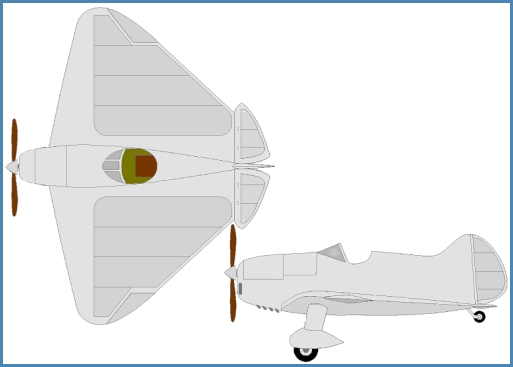

General information
- Type: Experimental aircraft
- National origin: France
- Manufacturer: Payen
- Number built: 1

History
- First flight: 1936

The Payen or Aubrun-Payen AP.10 was an experimental aircraft designed and built in collaboration with Nicolas Roland Payen in the 1930s.

== Design ==
The AP.10 was a tailless single-seat aircraft of reverse-delta configuration. In this it differed markedly from Payen's extensive line of sharply-swept delta canard designs.

== Specifications ==
Data from

General characteristics

- Crew: 1
- Length: 4.16 m (13 ft 8 in)
- Wingspan: 4.95 m (16 ft 3 in)
- Height: 1.86 m (6 ft 1 in)
- Wing area: 10.00 m^{2} (107.6 sq ft)
- Empty weight: 200 kg (441 lb)
- Gross weight: 340 kg (750 lb)
- Powerplant: 1 × Train inverted air-cooled in-line piston engine, 30 kW (40 hp)

Performance

- Maximum speed: 200 km/h (120 mph, 110 kn)
- Range: 900 km (560 mi, 490 nmi)
- Service ceiling: 5,000 m (16,000 ft)

== Bibliography ==
- Roux, Robert J. (November 1969). "Les avions Payen" [The Payen Aircraft]. Le album de fanatique de l'Aviation (in French) (5): 2–6. ISSN 0757-4169.
