= Payen Pa 49 =

Pa 49 Katy
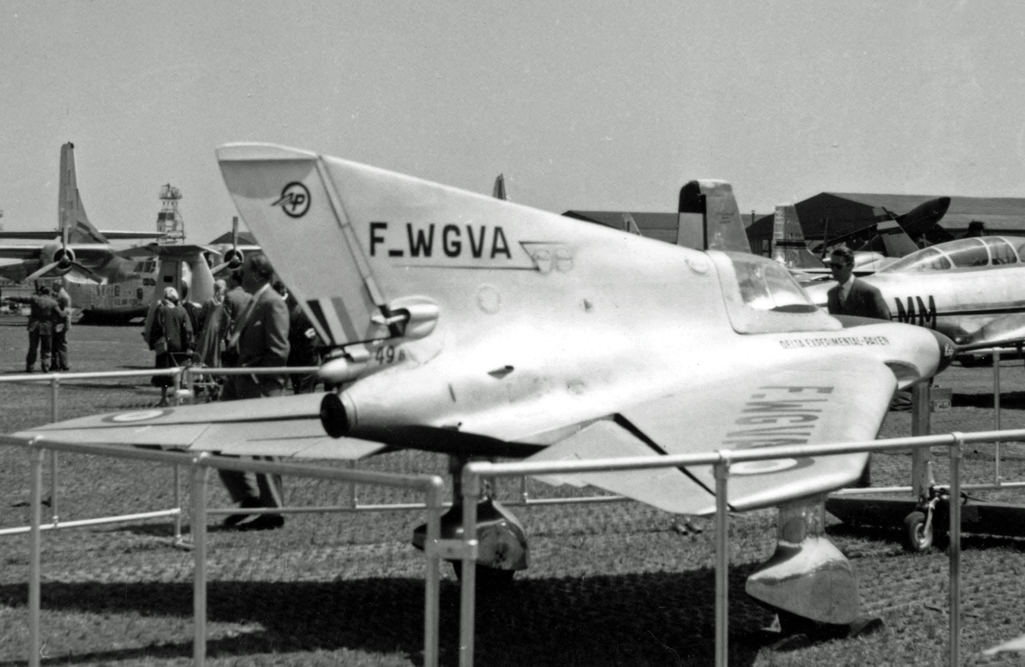
- The sole Pa 49 Katy on display at the 1957 Paris Air Show

General information
- Type: Experimental tailless swept wing
- National origin: France
- Manufacturer: Payen-Aviation, Juvisy, Seine et Oise
- Designer: Roland Payen
- Number built: 1

History
- First flight: 22 January 1954
- Retired: 1958

The Payen Pa 49 Katy was a small experimental French turbojet powered tailless aircraft, designed by Nicolas Roland Payen, and first flown in 1954. It was the first French aircraft of this kind and the smallest jet aircraft of its day.

== Design and development ==
Roland Payen was a pioneer of tailless and delta winged aircraft, building two designs, a light aircraft and a fighter, before the Second World War. The Pa 49 Katy was his first post-war design.

The all-wood Katy was a tailless aircraft, having no separate horizontal stabiliser. The wing leading edge was swept at about 55° but, unlike the classic delta with its straight trailing edge, the Katy's was swept at about 30° with each trailing edge carrying full span control surfaces, elevators inboard and ailerons outboard.

At its root, the wing merged gently into the fuselage with small air intakes for the 1.47 kN (330 lbf) Turbomeca Palas engine built into the leading edge. The cockpit was placed just aft of the intakes and the long straight-edged fin, swept at about 75° and initially as wide as the cockpit, began immediately behind it, narrowing to a slightly swept trailing edge carrying a full depth rudder. Images recorded before the first flight show the Katy with a low bicycle undercarriage with wing tip skids, but, by the time of the flight itself, this was replaced by a fixed, un-faired tricycle undercarriage.

== Operational history ==
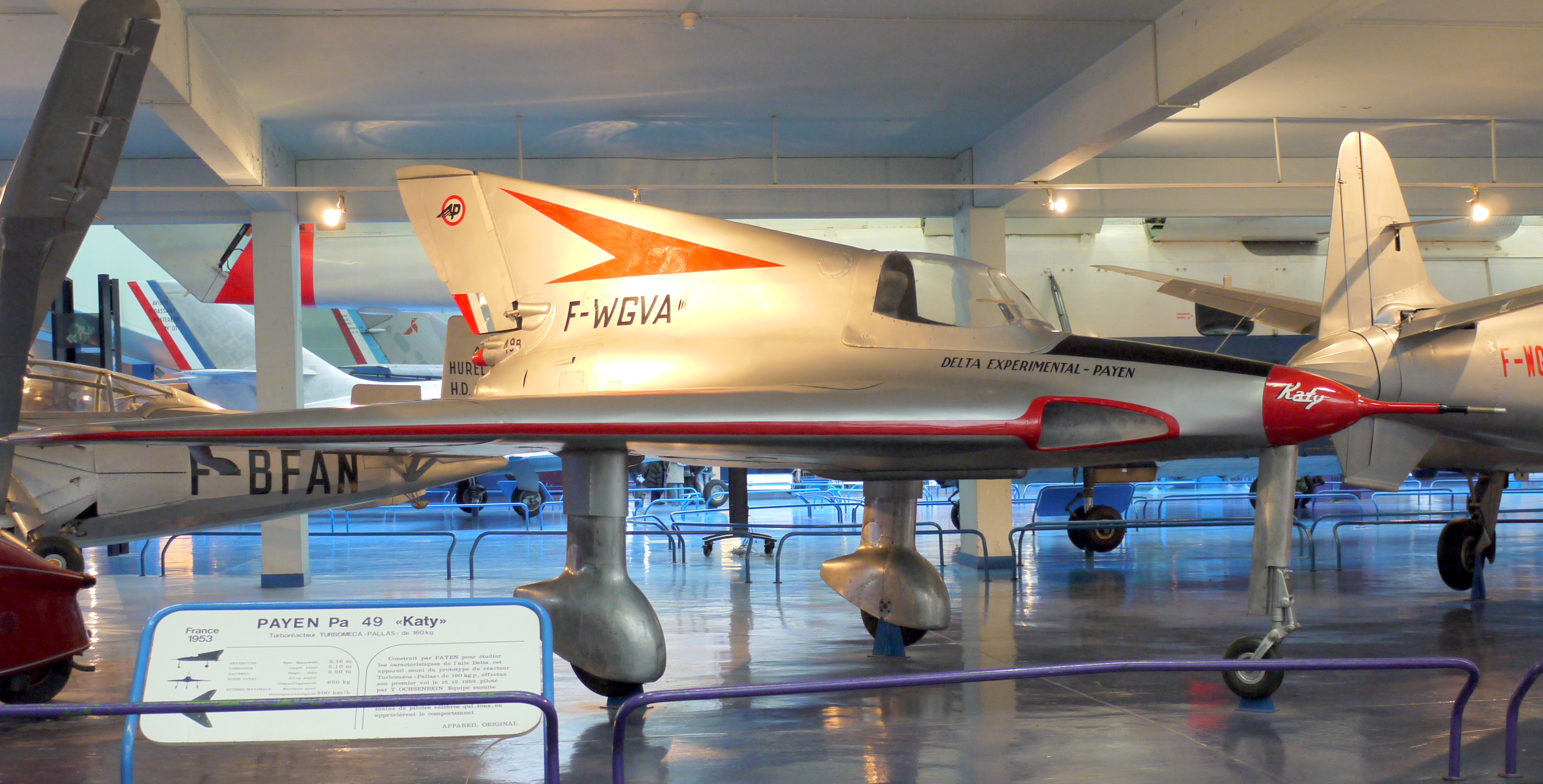
The Pa 49 Katy has been in the Musée de l'Air at Le Bourget since 1958

The first flight of what was now the Pa 49A took place on 22 January 1954 at Melun-Villaroche flown by Tony Ochsenbein, a comparatively inexperienced pilot, who had previously logged only 30 minutes on jets. Ten hours of manufacturer's testing was followed, in April 1954, by assessment at the Centre d'Essais en Vol (CEV), Brétigny-sur-Orge. The aerobatic ability of the Pa 49 was established. At the CEV it was fitted with a split rudder airbrake; the two surfaces of the rudder separated from just below the tip, driven via faired external links near the bottom, into a V at the hinge for braking, rotating together for yaw control. This airbrake was designed by Fléchair SA, a company founded by Payen. At the time of its appearance at the 12th Salon International d'Aeronautique at Paris, in 1957, the undercarriage legs were faired and the main wheels enclosed in spats and the aircraft renamed the Pa 49B. For a time the nosewheel was also spatted. There were plans for a version with a retractable undercarriage, but this did not come about.

When the flight testing programme ended in 1958 Payen gave the aircraft to the Musée de l'Air et de l'Espace at Paris - Le Bourget Airport. He continued to design delta winged aircraft and the Payen Pa 71 and Pa 149 projects of the 1970s were direct developments of the Katy.

== Specifications ==
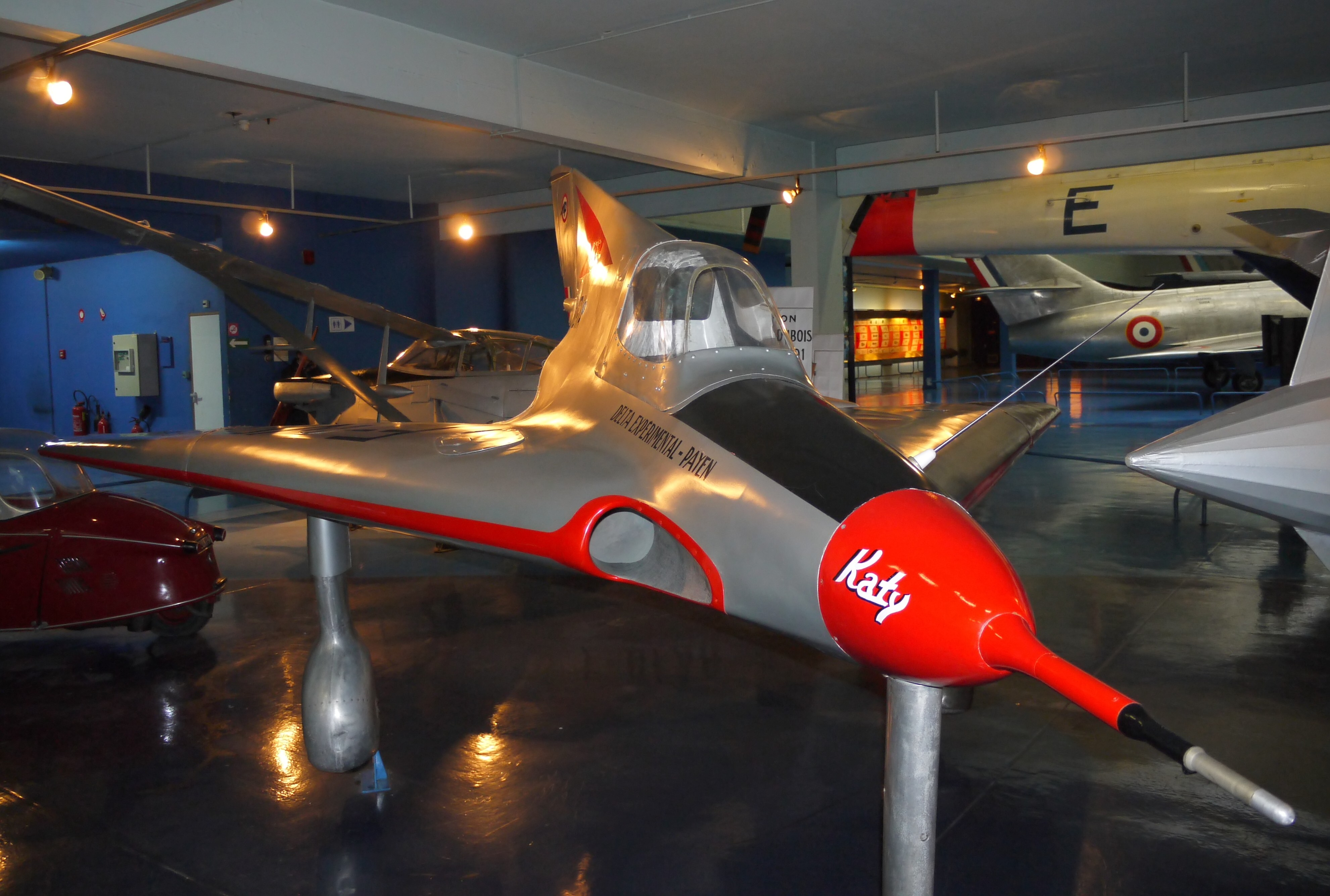
The Pa 49 at Le Bourget

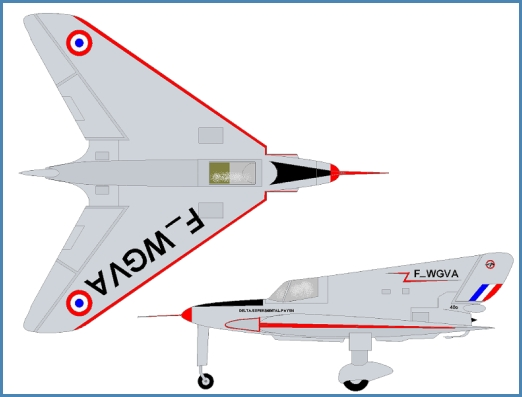

Data from Jane's All the World's Aircraft 1956–57

General characteristics

- Crew: 1
- Length: 5.10 m (16 ft 9 in)
- Wingspan: 5.16 m (16 ft 11 in)
- Height: 2.50 m (8 ft 2 in)
- Empty weight: 457 kg (1,008 lb)
- Gross weight: 650 kg (1,433 lb)
- Powerplant: 1 × Turbomeca Palas centrifugal-flow turbojet, 1.5 kN (330 lbf) thrust

Performance

- Maximum speed: 500 km/h (310 mph, 270 kn)
- Cruise speed: 350 km/h (220 mph, 190 kn)
- Range: 450 km (280 mi, 240 nmi)
- Service ceiling: 8,500 m (27,900 ft)
- Rate of climb: 5.8 m/s (1,140 ft/min) initial

== See also ==
Related development

- Payen PA-22

== Bibliography ==
- Buttler, Tony and Jean-Louis Delezenne. X-Planes of Europe: Secret Research Aircraft from the Golden Age 1946-1974. Manchester, UK: Hikoki Publications, 2012. ISBN 978-1-902-10921-3
- Pelletier, Alain J. (March–April 1997). "Paper Darts to Deltas: The Designs of Roland Payen". Air Enthusiast. No. 68. pp. 33–44. ISSN 0143-5450.
- Roux, Robert J. (December 1969). "Les avions Payen (2)" [Payen Aircraft, Part 2]. Le album de fanatique de l'Aviation (in French) (6): 2–6. ISSN 0757-4169.
