= Payen PA-22 =

French experimental aircraft

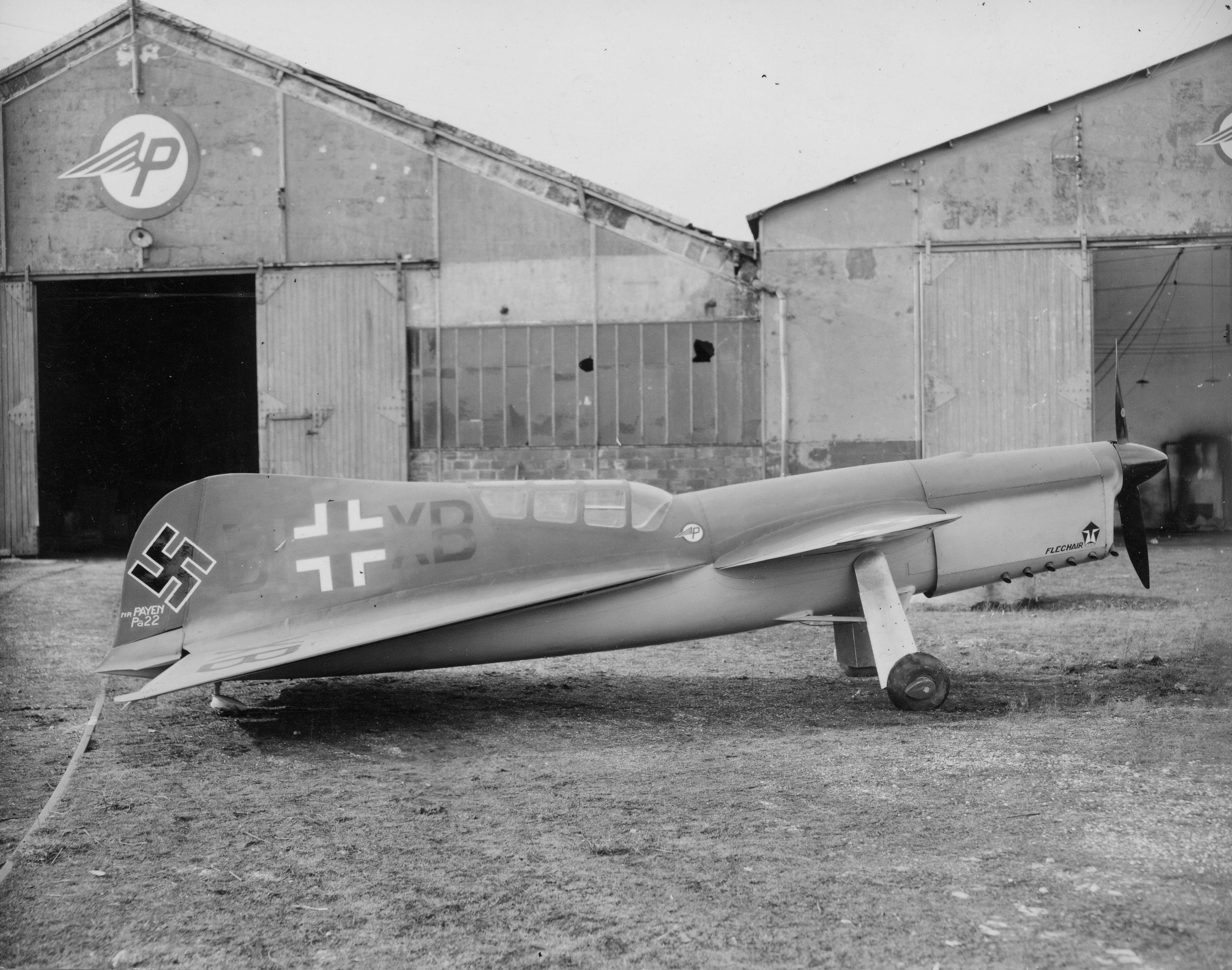
- Captured PA-22 with Luftwaffe markings

General information
- Type: Experimental aircraft
- National origin: France
- Manufacturer: Payen
- Number built: 1

History
- First flight: October 18, 1942

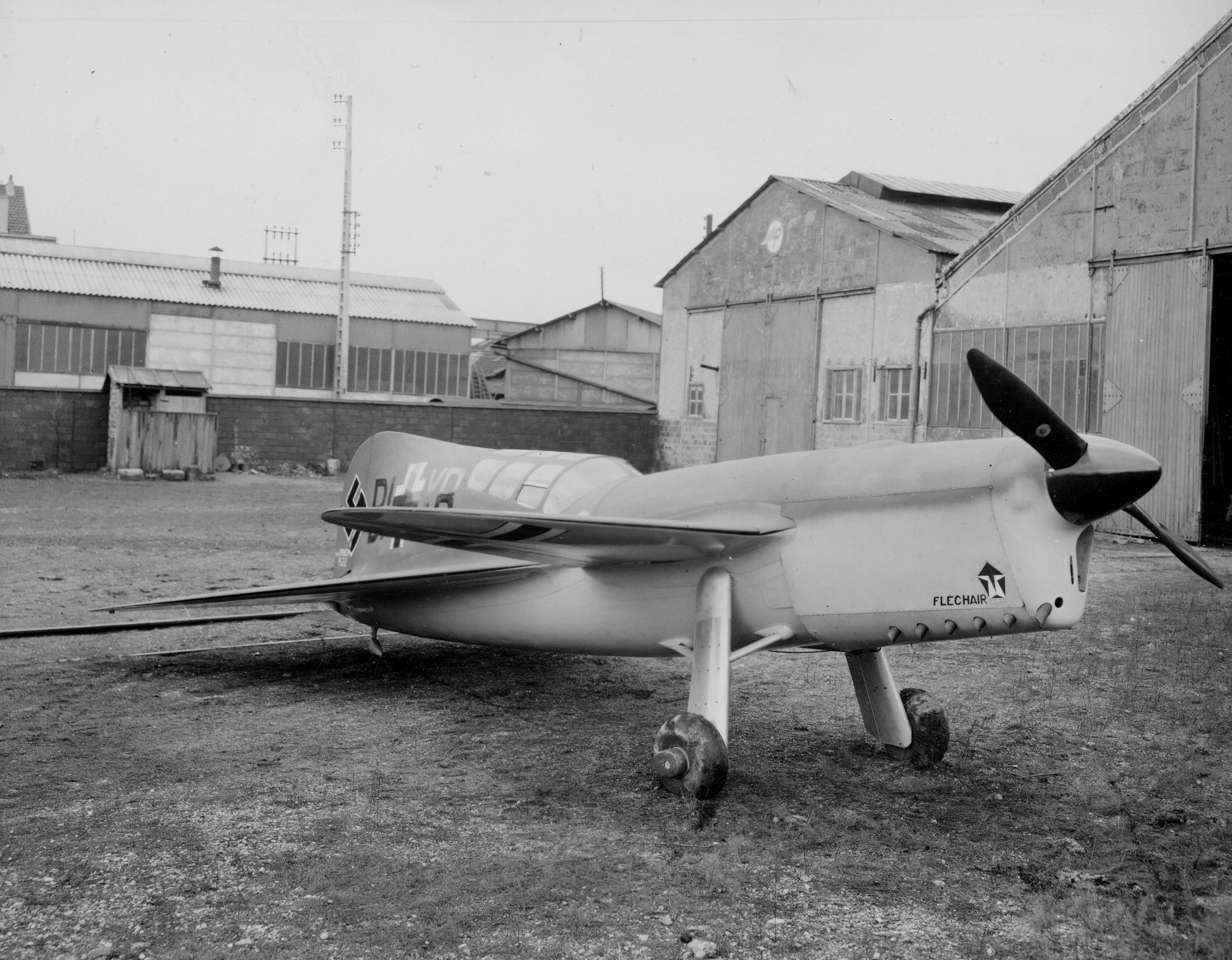
Frontal view

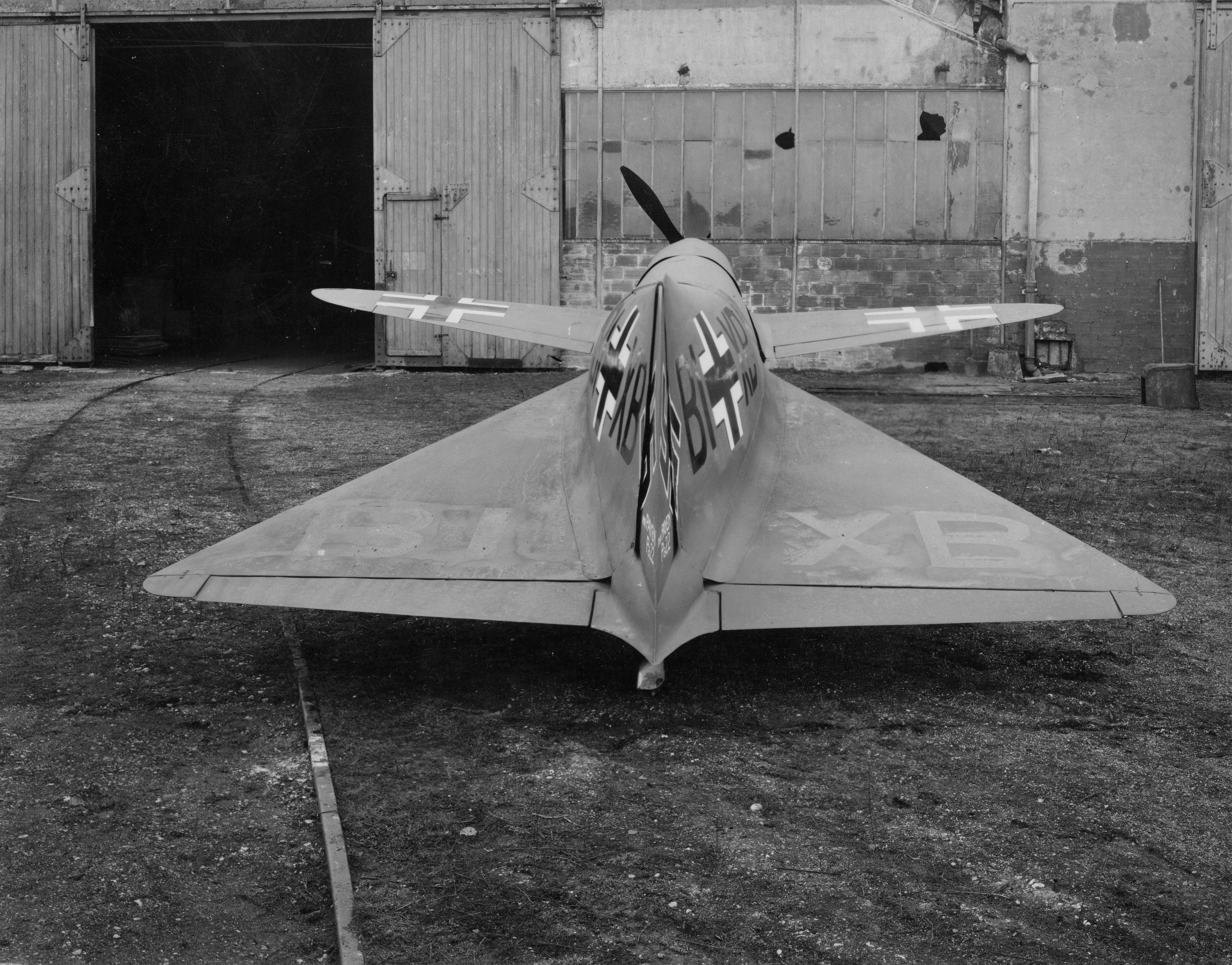
View from directly behind

The Payen PA-22 was a French experimental aircraft designed by Nicolas Roland Payen.

The aircraft had an unconventional design: it had a set of delta wings, in front of which were a set of short conventional wings. It had a fixed front landing gear and the cockpit was further back than usual.

== Design and development ==
In 1935 the prolific aircraft designer Roland Payen developed a radical tandem-wing configuration aircraft which he dubbed the "Fléchair" (Arrow). The PA 22/1R was to be powered by an early form of ramjet known as the Melot 1R engine. This design was to participate in the 1939 Coupe Deutsch de la Meurthe air race. Unfortunately the Melot engine was not able to develop the required thrust and the 1939 Coupe Deutsch de la Meurthe was cancelled due to the start of World War II.

Payen redesigned the aircraft around a Regnier 180-horsepower (134 kW) 6B-01 six-cylinder, air-cooled inverted in-line engine, which was designated PA 22/2, and was completed in 1939. During its testing in the wind tunnel at Chalais-Meudon (Paris), the Germans invaded France and confiscated it. The German occupation forces were intrigued by the design and completed the wind tunnel testing. Redesignated the PA 22 V5, painted in German colors and coded BI+XB, the aircraft was transferred to Villacoublay. In October 1942 Payen's test pilot Jacques Charpantier, completed the first flight. A flight test program was started, but before it was completed Payen convinced the German authorities that modifications were necessary and had the prototype returned to his factory at Juvisy-sur-Orge.

Improvements including a variable-pitch propeller and supplementary fuel tanks were started but in 1943 an Allied air raid on the Juvisy railway yard also struck the factory, destroying the PA 22.

== Specifications ==
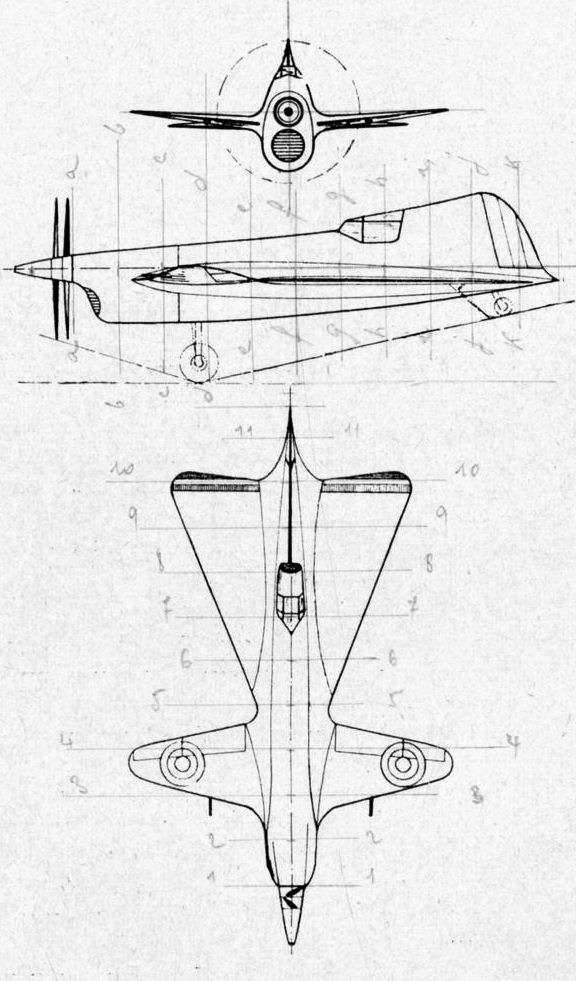
Payen Pa-112 3-view drawing from L'Aerophile October 1938

General characteristics

- Crew: 1
- Length: 7.48 m (24 ft 6 in)
- Wingspan: 4.8 m (15 ft 9 in)
- Height: 2.35 m (7 ft 9 in)
- Wing area: 10 m^{2} (110 sq ft)
- Empty weight: 560 kg (1,235 lb)
- Max takeoff weight: 955 kg (2,105 lb)
- Powerplant: 1 × Regnier R.6 6-cyl. inverted air-cooled in-line piston engine, 130 kW (180 hp)

Performance

- Maximum speed: 360 km/h (220 mph, 190 kn)
- Cruise speed: 330 km/h (205 mph, 178 kn)
- Range: 1,200 km (750 mi, 650 nmi)
- Service ceiling: 5,600 m (18,500 ft)

== See also ==
- Payen Pa 49

== Bibliography ==
- Pelletier, Alain J. (March–April 1997). "Paper Darts to Deltas: The Designs of Roland Payen". Air Enthusiast. No. 68. pp. 33–44. ISSN 0143-5450.
- Roux, Robert J. (November 1969). "Les avions Payen" [The Payen Aircraft]. Le Album de Fanatique de l'Aviation (in French) (5): 2–6. ISSN 0757-4169.
