= IAI Nammer =

Israeli jet fighter prototype

Nammer
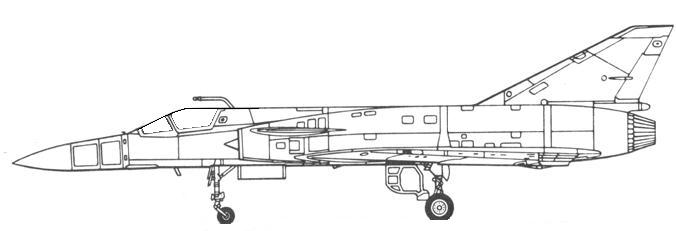

General information
- Type: Fighter
- National origin: Israel
- Manufacturer: Israel Aerospace Industries (IAI)
- Status: Cancelled
- Number built: 1

History
- First flight: 21 March 1991
- Developed from: Dassault Mirage 5 IAI Kfir

The IAI Nammer (נמר "Leopard") was a fighter aircraft developed in the Israeli aerospace manufacturing Israel Aerospace Industries (IAI) during the late 1980s and early 1990s. The programme was pursued as a private venture and the resultant aircraft was intended for the export market.

During the 1980s, IAI decided to embark upon the independent development of a modernised version of the IAI Kfir; reusing its airframe and pairing it with a modernised cockpit, engine, and avionics, the latter of which was to have taken advantage of the earlier work undertaken for the cancelled IAI Lavi programme. These changes were to result in greater performance, range, and air-to-air combat capabilities than the preceding Kfir. Named Nammer, the aircraft was to be offered under various different configurations, including alternative engines and radars, as well as prospective licensed production arrangements, to customers. IAI stated that they were willing to be highly flexible with the Nammer's launch customers, being open to giving them great leeway over modifying the design and incorporating their own systems as to their preferences.

Development of the Nammer proceeded to the prototype stage; a single aircraft was constructed to function as a proof-of-concept prototype, demonstrating IAI's capability to successfully install and operate advanced avionics in existing airframes, in this case the Mirage III/Kfir. On 21 March 1991, the prototype performed its maiden flight. Following on from its first flight, it continued to be used for test flights for some time, demonstrating both the maturity of the concept and of the new IAI-integrated systems. While the proven delta canard configuration of the airframe had been retained, testing was focused upon the new avionics installed, which were said by IAI to make for a relatively modern fighter aircraft. However, despite the company's lengthy efforts to seek both partner companies and export customers for the Nammer, neither participants in the programme nor buyers of the finished proved to be forthcoming; as such, development of the Nammer was ultimately ceased by IAI during the early 1990s without any further examples having been constructed.

== Development ==
During the 1980s, Israeli aerospace company Israel Aircraft Industries (IAI), decided to embark upon the development of a private-venture fighter aircraft; as envisaged, this programme was to be principally based around the airframe of the IAI Kfir and the advanced avionics that had been developed for the cancelled IAI Lavi. Speaking on the Nammer, Moshe Scharf, IAI's director of international military aircraft marketing stated of the reasoning behind the initiative: "Upgrading the existing Kfir platform will not be as cheap as building a new airframe based on the proven delta canard concept". By early 1988, the company had completed the preliminary design and system definition stages of the Nammer's development and had progressed onto the detail design phase. Additionally, the company had conducted early discussions with prospective customers in respect to the type. In particular, IAI was keen to form a partnership with another entity with which to carry out further development work and subsequent production on the Nammer programme.

During the late 1980s, IAI had originally announced and marketed the Nammer as being an upgrade package for existing Mirage III and Mirage 5 airframes. Customers were to have been offered a choice of two basic configurations of the type, one based around re-engining the aircraft with a General Electric F404, while the other was to have retained the Mirage's SNECMA Atar engine but integrated either the Elta EL/M-2011 or EL/M-2032 fire-control radar. The first of these options was envisioned to maximise the aircraft's performance and range while the second was to have served to increase the air-to-air targeting capabilities of the Nammer.

As development progressed, the Nammer came to be advertised by the company as being a new-build aircraft, featuring the EL/M-2032 radar as an integral part of the package. Reportedly, customers were able to choose their preferred engine, ranging from the General Electric F404 (or its Volvo Aero-built derivative, the RM12), the SNECMA M53, and the Pratt & Whitney PW1120, all of which being within the 18,0001b-20,0001b-thrust class. The company has claimed that the proven delta canard configuration of the airframe, when paired with new avionics and a more modern engine design, would result in a relatively modern fighter aircraft, comparable to the General Dynamics F-16A Fighting Falcon or Dassault Mirage 2000, but at a cost of approximately half of the price of the latter aircraft.

For development and demonstration purposes, a single prototype was constructed by the company. On 21 March 1991, this prototype performed its maiden flight. According to IAI, the concept was presented to a number of foreign air forces while seeking to secure sales of the aircraft; the company also stated that it had no intentions to proceed with production of the aircraft until orders for a minimum of 80 aircraft had been secured. It is known that in the course of these negotiations, IAI offered a high degree of customisability to prospective operators, essentially allowing for them to make a significant impact upon the Nammer's design. The company also offered various manufacturing arrangements, from constructing the Nammer at the company's existing facilities in Israel to the potential establishment of a final assembly line within a client customer's country. During 1990, as part of a renewed sales effort, IAI offered to effectively entirely transfer production of the Nammer, along with the onboard systems and software, overseas to customers.

== Design ==
The IAI Nammer was a proposed fighter aircraft, the airframe of which being derived from the earlier IAI Kfir (which was, in turn, based upon the Dassault Mirage 5). Externally, the design bore a strong resemblance to the C7 model of the Kfir; however, it could be easily distinguished by the presence of a longer nose and the lack of a dorsal airscoop at the base of the leading edge of the tailfin. Other areas of the aircraft also featured major differences from the Kfir, including in its cockpit, radar and engine. According to IAI, Nammer was to possess a maximum speed of Mach 2.2 and a 58,000 ft (19,300m) stabilised ceiling. The company intended to offer the Nammer with a choice of engines – either the Mirage Ill's original Snecma Atar 9K50, or a variety of more modern powerplants, which would typically possess greater fuel-efficiency and reduced weight than the original engine.

The cockpit of the Nammer was extensively modernised, includes a new overall layout which, amongst other benefits, would have permitted its pilot to maintain effective control of the aircraft via hands-on-throttle-and-stick (HOTAS) operation of all of the key systems under the majority of anticipated operational circumstances. A total of four displays, comprising a head-up display, a pair of multi-function displays, and a radar warning/electronic countermeasures display, were intended to supply the pilot with all necessary information. The various displays and the solid-state instrumentation for the engine was to be based upon reused Lavi technology. The avionics were a major focus area of the Nammer's development.

According to IAI, the Nammer was to be equipped with an advanced weapon management system that was directly integrated with a multimode pulse-Doppler radar, while its electronic warfare suite included features originally designed for the cancelled Lavi would also have been potentially used. The maximum take-off weight of the aircraft was approximately 15,450 kg, while the maximum payload was 6,270 kg. It could internally contain a total of 3,000 kg of fuel, along with an additional 3,720 kg in external tanks. In addition, it was to be provided with an aerial refueling capability. According to repeated statements by IAI, serial production of the Nammer fighter would have had been available at a unit cost of less than $20 million.

== Specifications (as designed) ==
General characteristics

- Crew: one pilot
- Length: 16.00 m (52 ft 6 in)
- Wingspan: 8.22 m (27 ft 0 in)
- Height: 4.55 m (14 ft 11 in)
- Wing area: 34.8 m^{2} (375 sq ft)
- Gross weight: 16,511 kg (36,400 lb)
- Powerplant: 1 × various , 80–90 kN (18,000–20,000 lbf) thrust

Performance

- Maximum speed: Mach 2.2
- Range: 1,382 km (859 mi, 746 nmi)
- Service ceiling: 17,700 m (58,000 ft)

Armament

- 2 × fixed, forward-firing 30 mm DEFA cannons
- 6,270 kg (13,790 lb) of external stores

== See also ==
Related development

- Atlas Cheetah
- Dassault Mirage III
- Dassault Mirage 5
- IAI Kfir
