= Volvo RM12 =

Jet engine

RM12
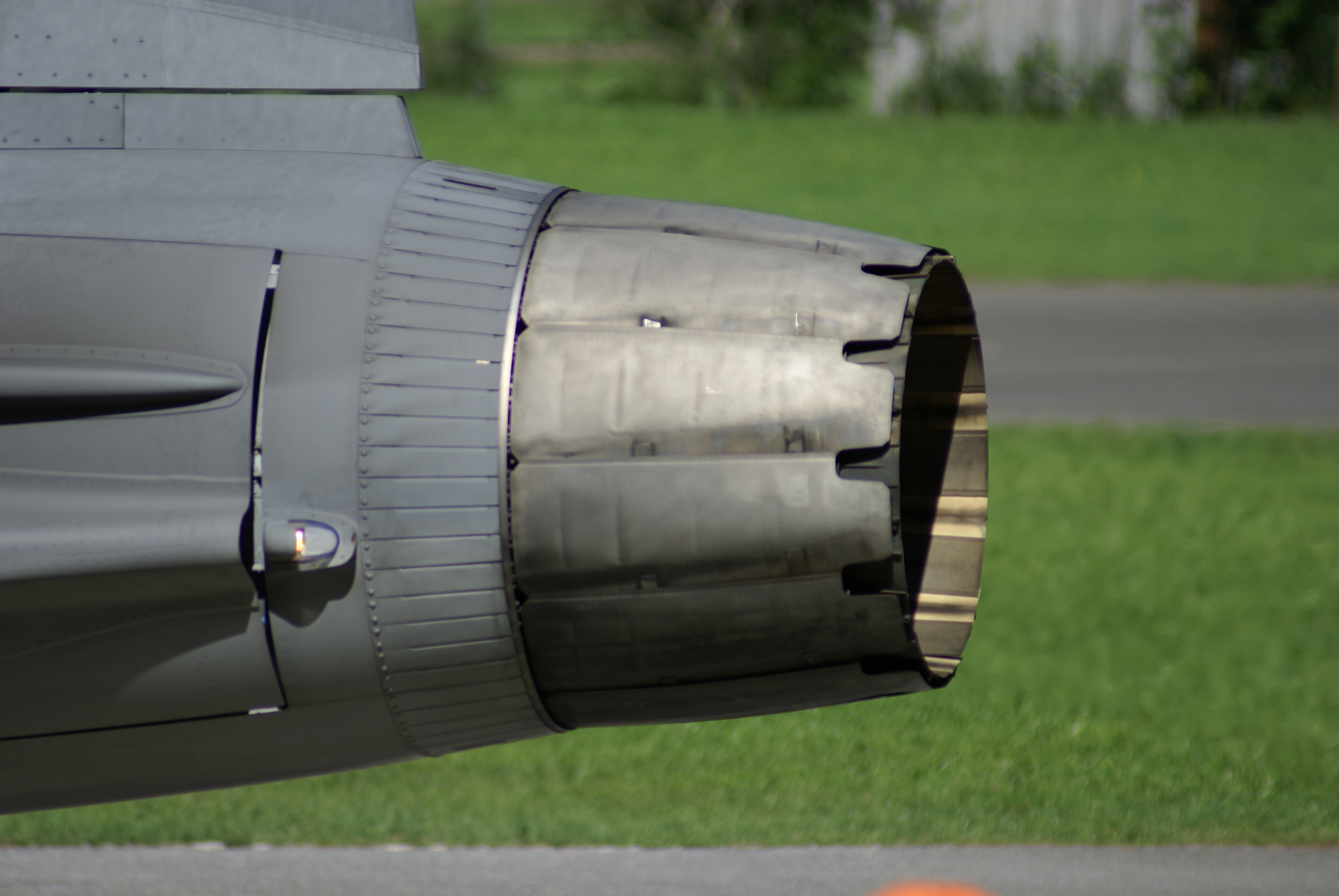
- Type: Turbofan
- National origin: United States/Sweden
- Manufacturer: Volvo Aero; General Electric
- Major applications: Saab JAS 39 Gripen
- Number built: 254
- Developed from: General Electric F404

Reaktionsmotor 12 (RM12) is a low-bypass afterburning turbofan jet engine developed for the Saab JAS 39 Gripen fighter. A version of the General Electric F404, the RM12 was produced by Volvo Aero (now GKN Aerospace Engine Systems). The last of the 254 engines was produced on 24 May 2011, at which time it had reached 160,000 flight hours without any serious incidents.

== Development ==
The whole JAS-project was complicated already without considering the parliamentary aspects, where a considerable minority spread over the party-lines either was principally against the military industry or opposed the growing costs of developing a domestic aircraft. The four main companies in IG JAS then were negotiating with the Överbefälhavaren (High Commander). chief of the airforce and Försvarets Materielverk (FMV), along with other major actors with different competences and areas of responsibility, while the Ministry of Defence interfered at random to prove that they were keeping things in control.

In an effort to get enough support for the JAS project, Saab had promised to cut the costs to the point where the previous Viggen was 50% more expensive than the new one. Somehow, this had been turned around into a promise to make the new aircraft 50% smaller than the 37, and that was where IG JAS found themselves stuck after a timid statement about what they actually had said resulted in accusations of reneging on their promise. Continuous studies done by FMV and Volvo Flygmotor AB (VFA) throughout the 1970s meant the candidates for what the new engine should be based on were quickly reduced to Pratt & Whitney F100 that would have resulted in an aircraft larger than the targeted 50%, or the smaller Turbo-Union RB199 and General Electric F404-400 that did not offer enough performance. FMV had informal contacts with the Israelis who were looking for an engine for their IAI Lavi as well as with P&W. Rather than joining in for the P&W PW1120, IG JAS went for the GE offer of an updated engine that had promise of low cost maintenance, the F404J.

This engine featured a more resilient first fan, a slightly higher turbine temperature. The F404's analogue Engine Control Unit was replaced with the Digital Engine Control, jointly developed by Volvo and GE, which communicates with the cockpit through the digital data buses and, as redundancy, a hydromechanical back-up. It was decided that GE would produce 65% of the engine and send it as a kit to VFA, who would manufacture the remaining 35% of the parts and be responsible for final assembly and testing.

== Design ==
Produced by Volvo Aero, the RM12 is a derivative of the General Electric F404J. Modifications included:

- Complete redesign of the fan to pass more flow for higher thrust, and be more tolerant of bird-strikes. The thickened first stage blades deform on impact (causing thrust loss) but do not fracture, or cause downstream damage. Minimal thrust loss (6%) was achieved during a test, after ingesting a half-kilogram (1.1 lb) pigeon-size bird at take-off conditions.
- Improvements to the variable stators behind the inlet vanes, before the fans and the compressor stages, to optimise airflow according to speed and AoA.
- Redesigned and duplicated circuit ignition systems.
- The 1996 development of a 50W full authority digital engine control (FADEC) system, with a mechanical calculator as a seamless backup.
- A completely redesigned, internally-cooled flame holder for the afterburner.

Several subsystems and components were also redesigned to reduce maintenance demands, including a modular design that split the engine into 7 distinct parts that can be replaced independently. The air intakes of the engine were designed to minimize radar reflection from the engine fan, reducing the radar cross section of the aircraft overall. Elements such as the fan/compressor discs and case, compressor spool, hubs, seals, and afterburner are manufactured in Sweden, final assembly also taking place there.

== Applications ==
- IAI Nammer (as designed, not built)
- Saab JAS 39A/B/C/D Gripen

== Specifications (RM12) ==
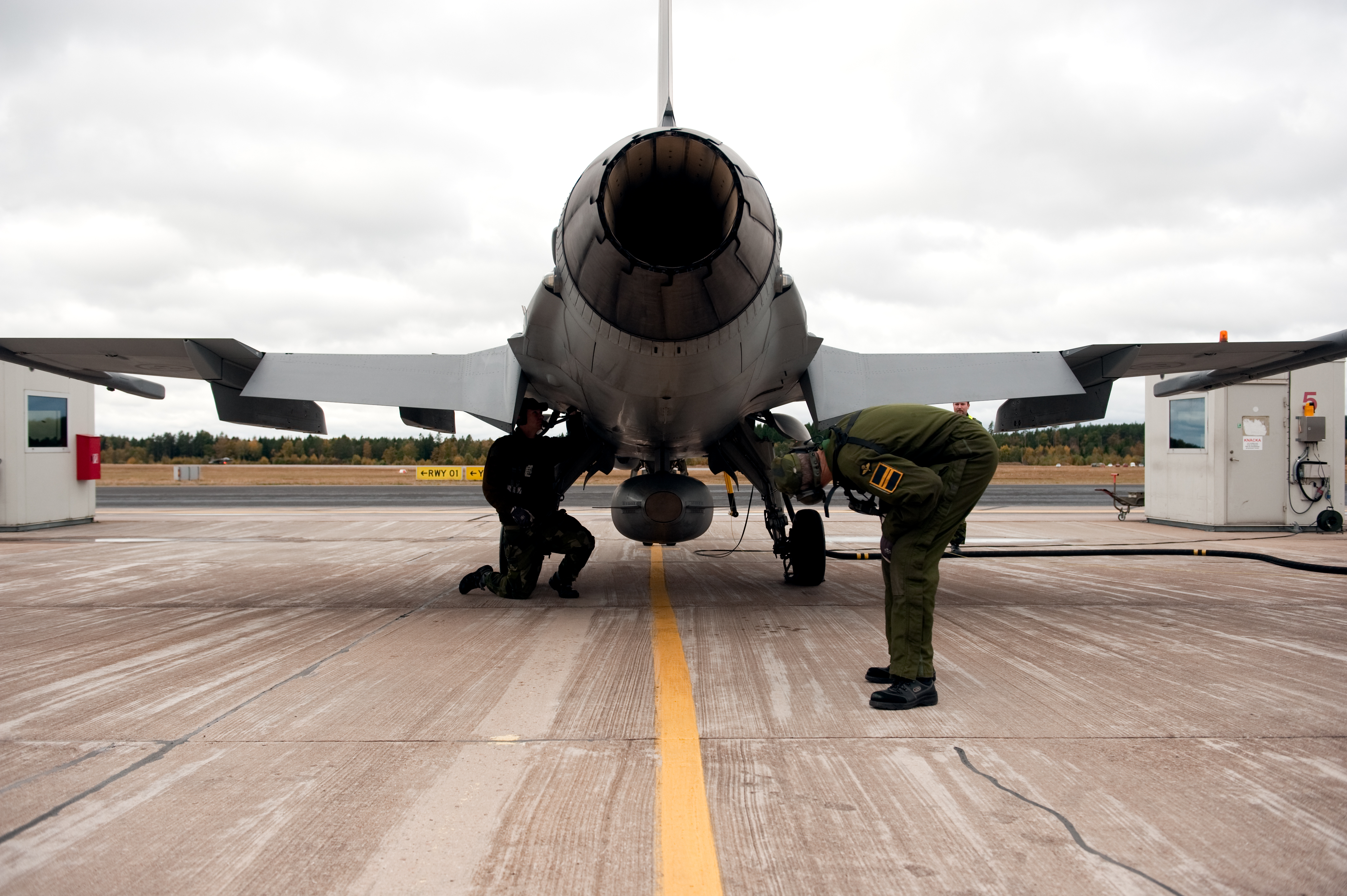
View showing engine variable exhaust nozzle

Data from JAS39, Städje

==== General characteristics ====
- Type: Afterburning low bypass turbofan
- Length: 4.04 m (13 ft 3 in)
- Diameter: 0.87 m (2 ft 10 in) when cool, 0.71 m (2 ft 4 in) inlet, 0.889 m (2 ft 11 in) maximal outlet.
- Dry weight: 1,054 kg (2,324 lb)

==== Components ====
- Compressor: Axial compressor with 3 fan and 7 compressor stages
- Combustors: annular
- Turbine: 1 low-pressure, max 221 r/s and 1 high-pressure stage, max 280 r/s
- Fuel type: MC 75

==== Performance ====
- Maximum thrust:
  - 54 kN (12,100 lbf) military thrust
  - 80.5 kN (18,100 lbf) with afterburner
- Overall pressure ratio: 27.5:1
- Bypass ratio: 0.31:1
- Air mass flow: 69 kg/s (150 lb/s)
- Fuel consumption: Gas generator 1.2 kg/s (2.6 lb/s), together with afterburner 4.0 kg/s (8.8 lb/s)
- Specific fuel consumption:
  - Military thrust: 23.9 mg/(N s) (0.844 lb/(lbf hr))
  - Full afterburner: 50.6 mg/(N s) (1.79 lb/(lbf hr))
- Thrust-to-weight ratio: 7.8

== See also ==
Related development

- General Electric YJ101
- General Electric F404
- General Electric F414
- General Electric F110

Comparable engines

- GTRE GTX-35VS Kaveri
- Guizhou WS-13
- Klimov RD-33
- Snecma M88
- Turbo-Union RB199

Related lists

- List of aircraft engines
