= Air superiority fighter =

Fighter aircraft designed for aerial combat

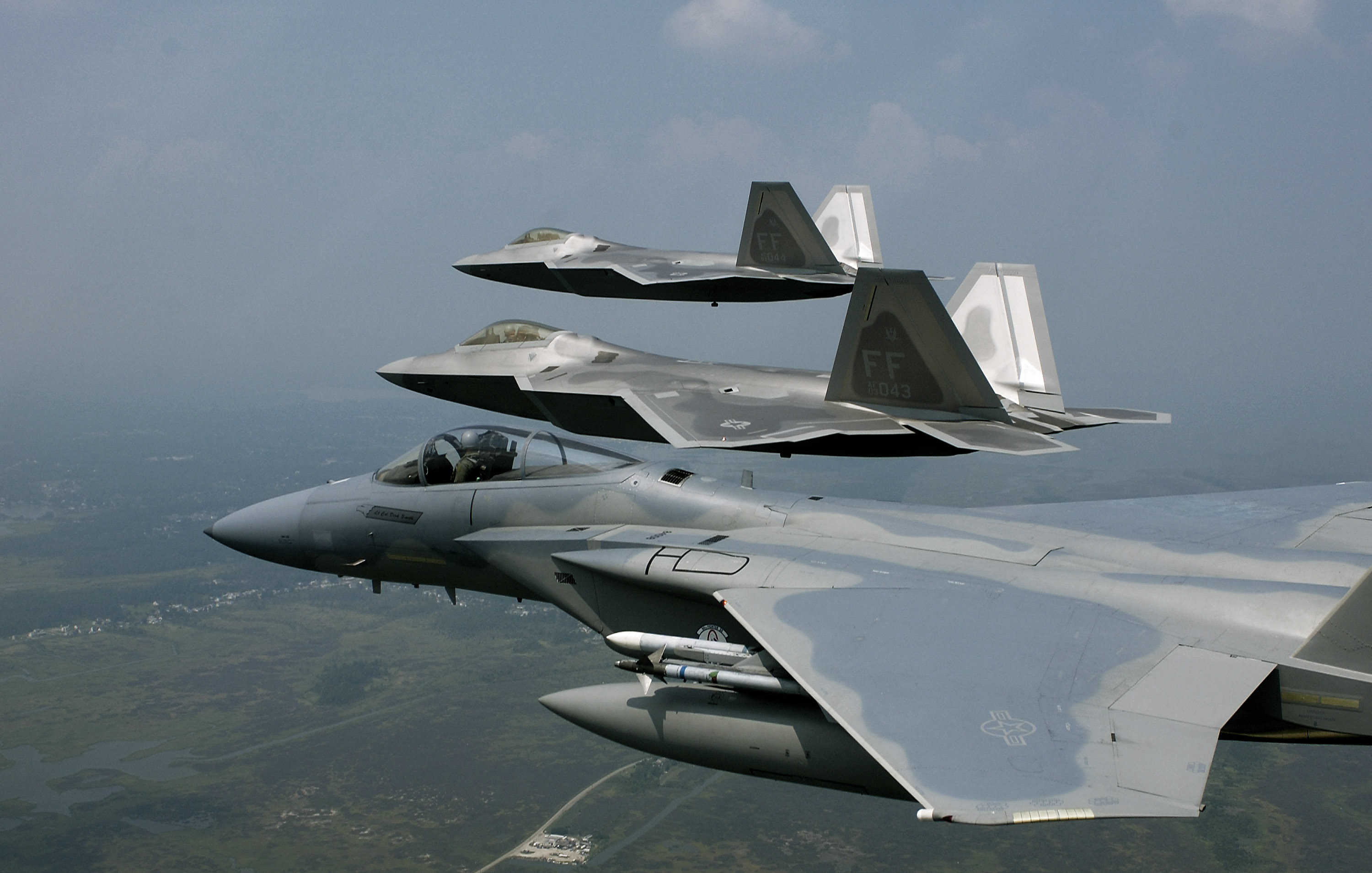
The F-15C and F-22 are mainline heavy air superiority fighters of the United States Air Force.

An air superiority fighter (also styled air-superiority fighter) is a fighter aircraft designed to seize control of enemy airspace by establishing tactical dominance (air superiority) over the opposing air force. Air-superiority fighters are primarily tasked to perform aerial combat against agile, lightly armed aircraft (most often enemy fighters) and eliminate any challenge over control of the airspace, although some (e.g. strike fighters) may have a secondary role for air-to-surface attacks.

== Evolution of the term ==
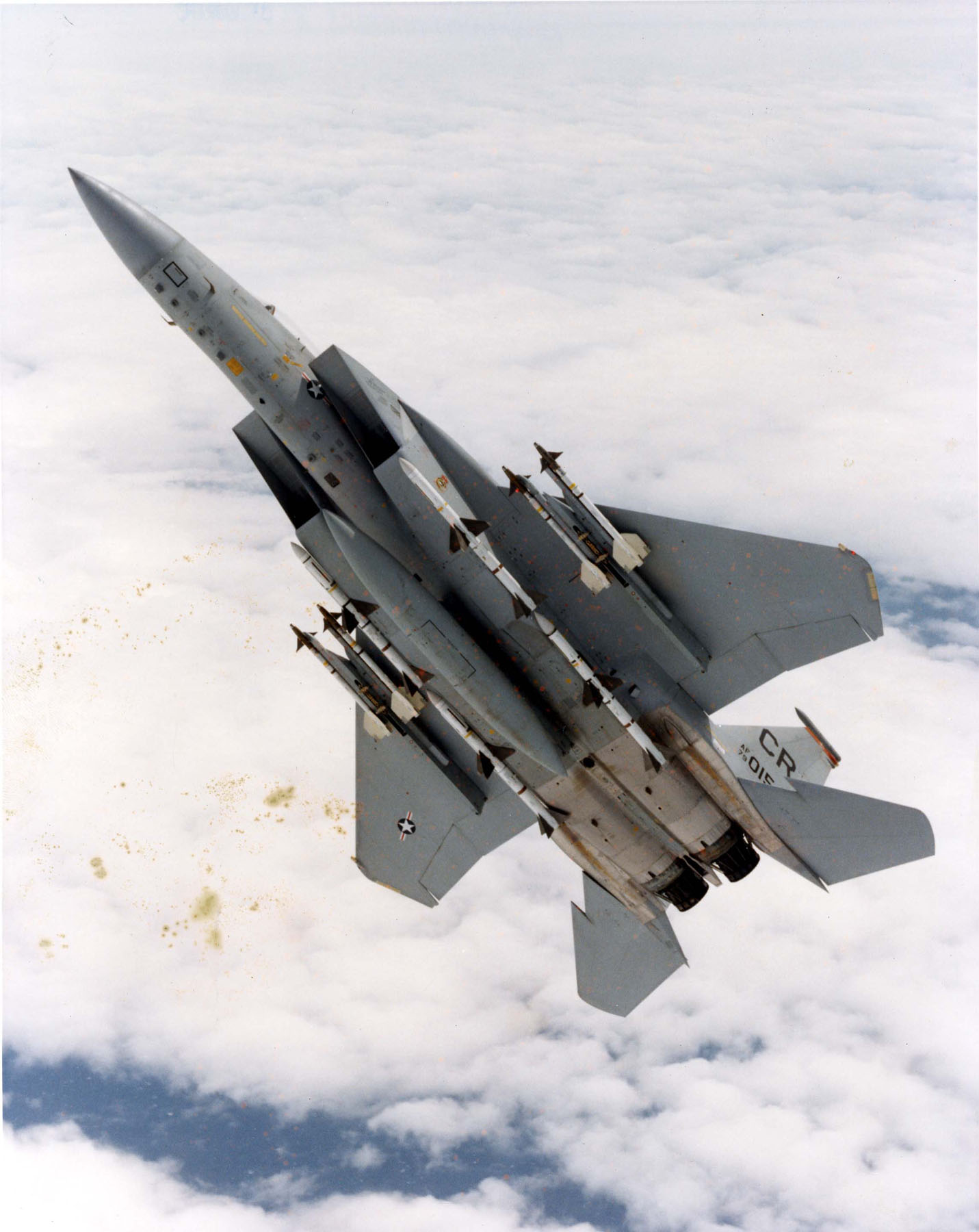
An F-15C armed with multiple air-to-air missiles

During World War II and through the Korean War, fighters were classified by their role: heavy fighter, interceptor, escort fighter, night fighter, and so forth. With the development of heat seeking and radar guided missiles in the 1950s, design diverged between fighters optimized to not fight in range of the enemy’s guns; as these missile technologies progressed, so did fighter doctrine. In the United States, the influential prevalence of radar guided missiles with longer ranges developed fighters with no forward-firing gun, such as the original F-4 Phantom II, as it was thought that they would never need to resort to a dogfight. In 1954 the first long range radar missiles (AIM-7 Sparrow) were first successfully tested creating the beyond visual range (BVR) regime (interceptors). These aircraft would sacrifice high maneuverability, and instead focus on other performance characteristics, as they presumably would never engage in a dogfight with enemy fighters.

=== The first air-superiority fighters ===
After lessons learned from combat experiences involving modern military air capacity, the U.S. Navy's VFAX/VFX and U.S. Air Force's F-X (Fighter Experimental) reassessed their tactical direction which resulted in the U.S. Navy's F-14 Tomcat and US Air Force's F-15 Eagle. The two designs were built to achieve air superiority and significant consideration was given during the development of both aircraft to allow them to excel at the shorter ranges of fighter combat. Both aircraft also serve as interceptors due to their high maximum speed and advanced radars.

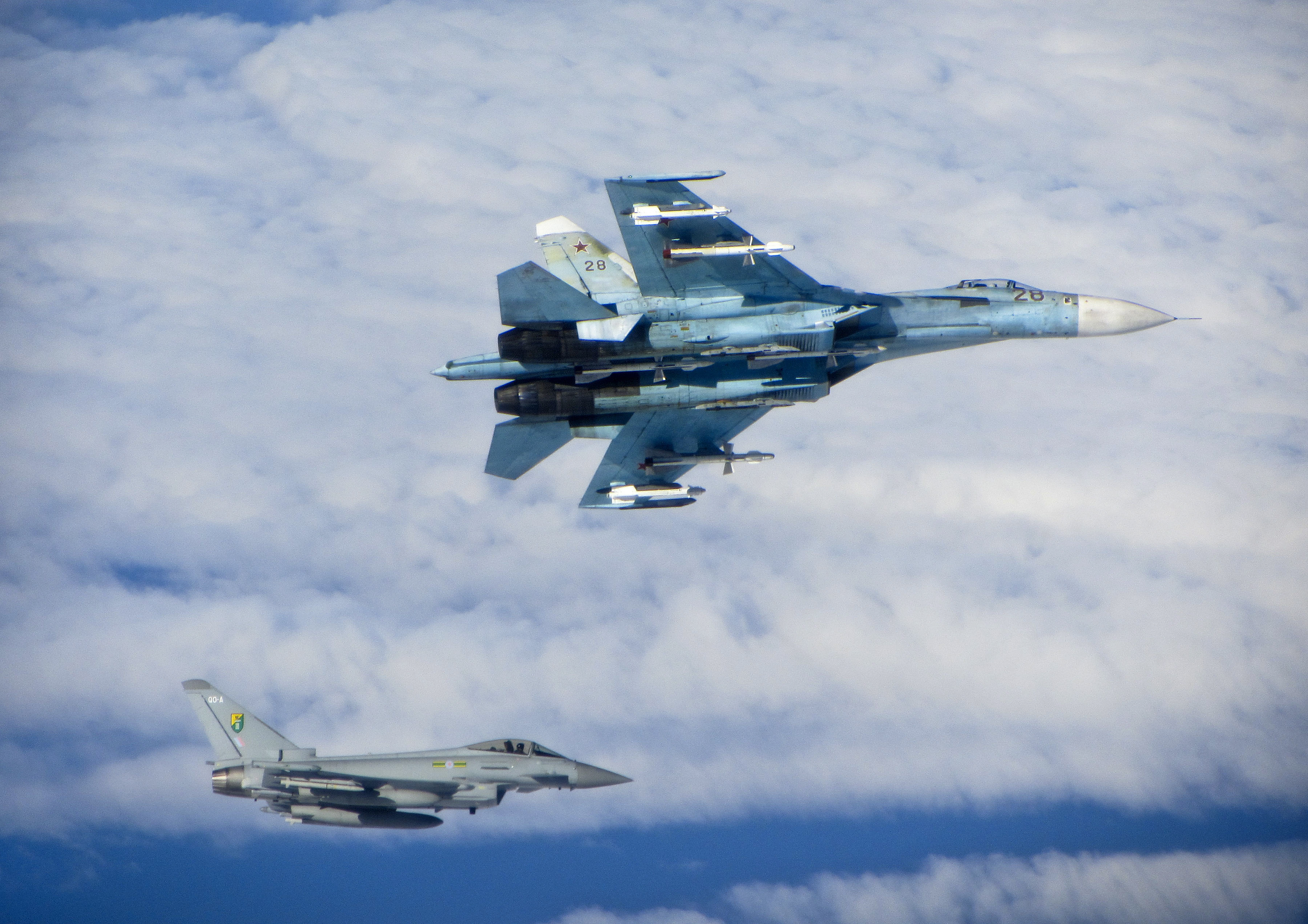
An armed Russian Air Force Sukhoi Su-27 encounters a Royal Air Force Eurofighter Typhoon.

By contrast, the Soviets (and the succeeding Russian Federation) developed and continue to operate separate types of aircraft, the interceptor MiG-31 and the short-range MiG-29 for air superiority, although the long-range Su-27 can combine the roles of air superiority and interceptor.

=== Evolution of secondary ground-attack capability ===
For the US Navy, the F-14 Tomcat was initially deployed solely as an air-superiority fighter, as well as fleet defense interceptor and tactical aerial reconnaissance. By contrast, the multirole F/A-18 Hornet was designed as strike fighter while having only enough of an edge to defend itself against enemy fighters if needed. While the F-14 had an undeveloped secondary ground attack capability (with a Stores Management System (SMS) that included air-to-ground options as well as rudimentary software in the AWG-9), the Navy did not want to risk it in the air-to-ground role at the time, due to its lack of proper defensive electronic countermeasures (DECM) and radar homing and warning (RHAW) for overland operations, as well as the fighter's high cost. In the 1990s, the US Navy added LANTIRN pods to its F-14s and deployed them on precision ground-attack missions.

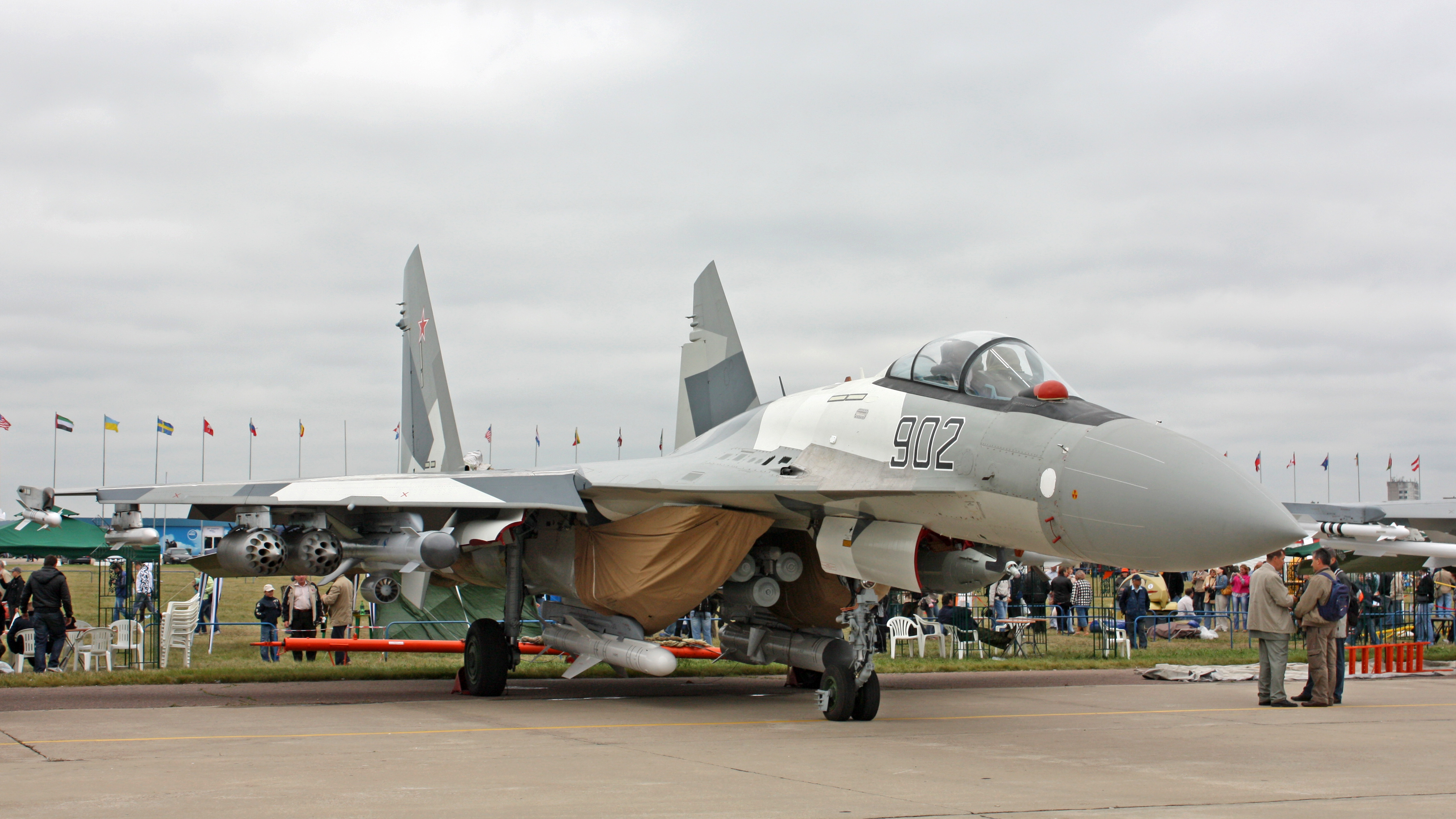
A Sukhoi Su-35s is being displayed with various standoff ammunition alongside standard air-to-air missiles

The F-15 Eagle was envisioned originally as an air-superiority fighter and interceptor under the mantra "not a pound for air-to-ground". However, the F-15C can carry "dumb" and GPS guided bombs, such capabilities which were first used by the Israeli Air Force. In fact, the basic airframe proved versatile enough to produce a very capable strike fighter, the F-15E Strike Eagle. While designed for ground attack, it retains the air-to-air lethality of the original F-15. Similarly, the F-16 Fighting Falcon was also originally designed as fighter but has since evolved into a successful all-weather multirole aircraft.

Since the 1990s, with air-superiority fighters such as the F-14 and F-15 pressed into the strike role and/or having a strike derivative, the lines between air-superiority fighters and multirole fighters or strike fighters has blurred somewhat, if not all modern jetfighters have been described or marketed as fully-capable multirole and strike fighters. The F-22 Raptor, designed primarily as an air superiority fighter, would receive precision strike capabilities through mission system upgrades. Similarly the MiG-29 and Su-27, despite originally designed for air superiority, have been commonly outfitted to use a range of air-to-surface armaments which would make them multirole fighters, indeed both the conventional Su-30 strike fighter and the Su-34 fighter-bomber has been derived from the Su-27, or the F-15E Strike Eagle and subsequently the F-15EX Eagle II are all major successful developments from the legacy F-15 Eagle. The Eurofighter Typhoon is another example of an aircraft designed as an air superiority fighter, but became multirole fighters with strike capabilities in later production tranches.

With the retirement of the F-14 Tomcat, the US Navy has pressed its F/A-18 Hornet and its upsized derivative, the F/A-18E/F Super Hornet, into a fleet defence fighter, despite the Hornets being originally designed as multirole strike fighters. Due to the high costs of aircraft development, the next generation of USAF air superiority platforms will be multirole with strike capabilities designed from the outset.

== List of active air-superiority fighters ==
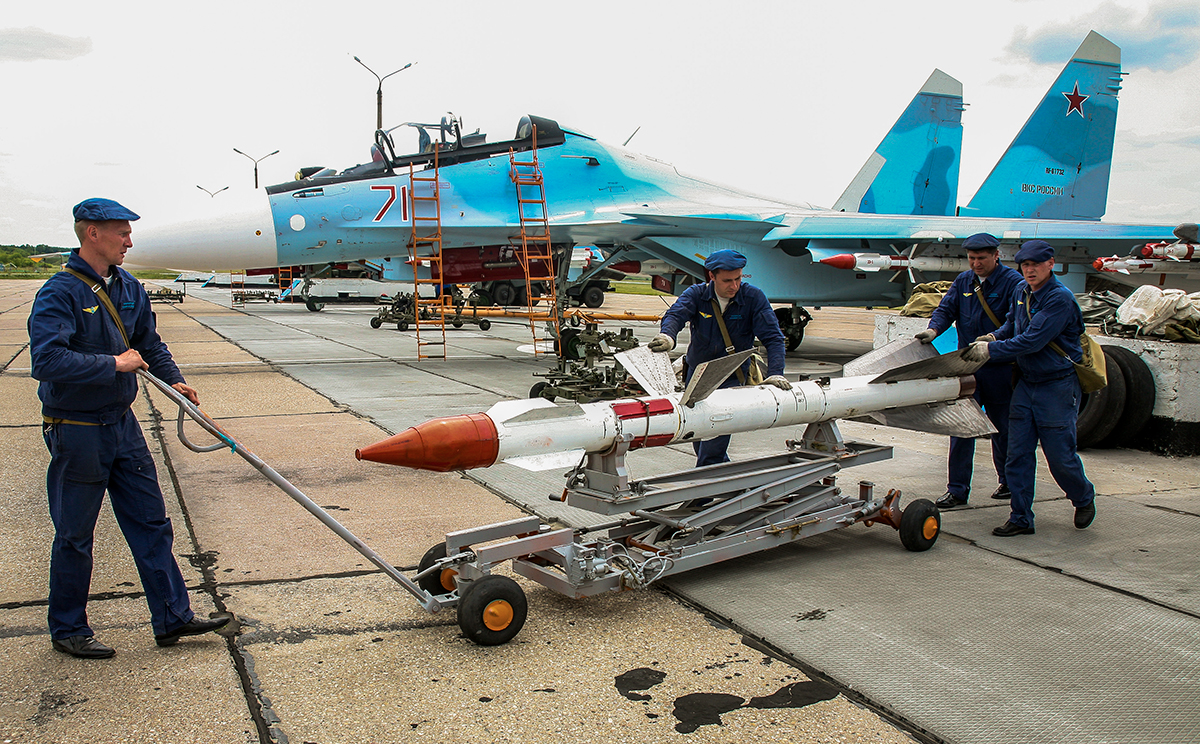
A Russian Su-30SM being loaded with R-27 medium-range missiles

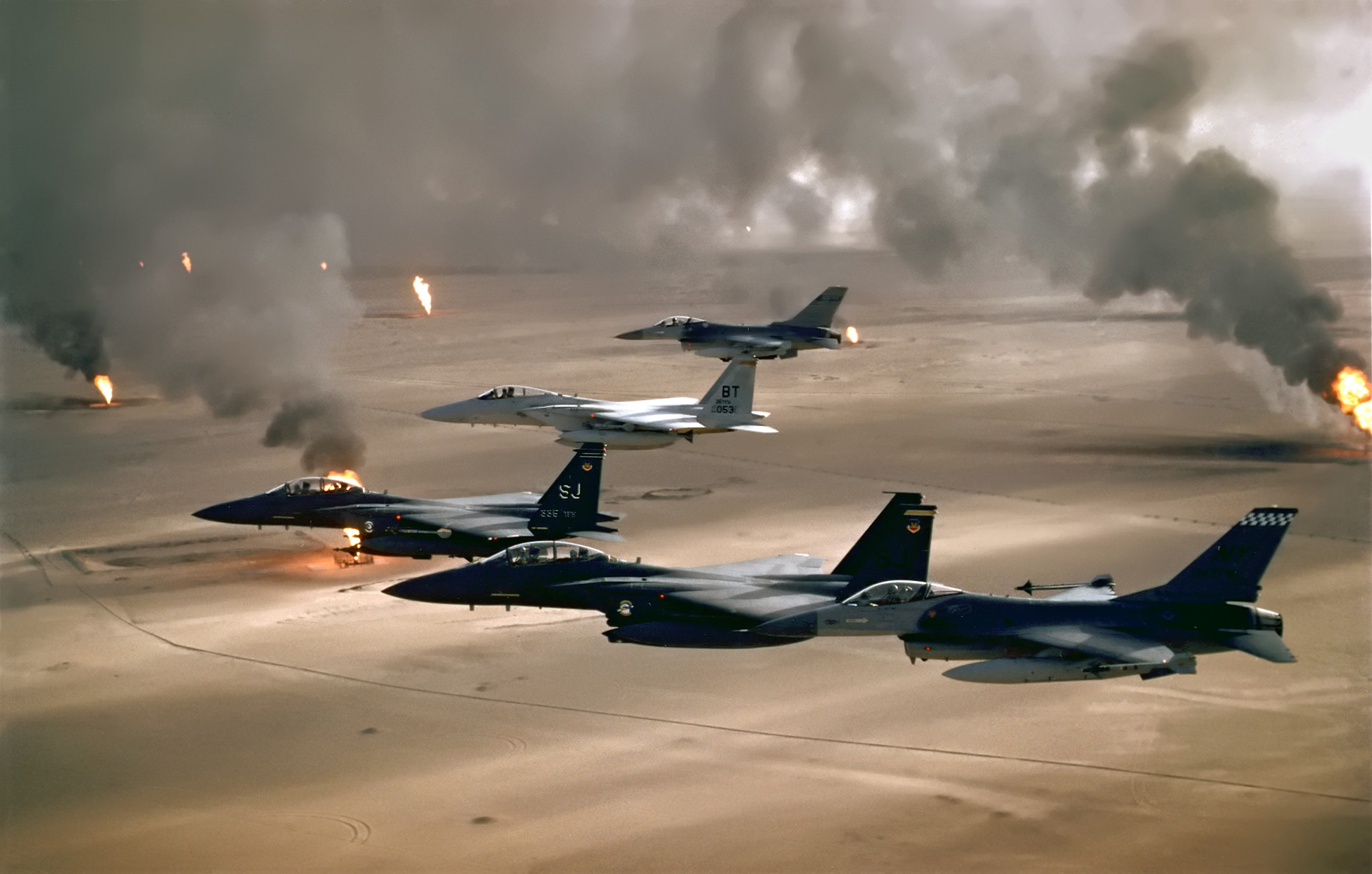
United States Air Force F-15 and F-16 during Operation Desert Storm

Country	Manufacturer	Aircraft	Introduced
United States	McDonnell Douglas	F-15	1976
United States	General Dynamics	F-16	1978
United States	Lockheed Martin	F-22	2005
Japan	Mitsubishi Heavy Industries	F-15J	1981
Russia	Mikoyan	MiG-29	1983
Russia	Sukhoi	Su-27	1985
Russia	Sukhoi	Su-30	2011
Russia	Sukhoi	Su-33	1998
Russia	Sukhoi	Su-35	2014
Russia	Sukhoi	Su-57	2020
China	Shenyang Aerospace	J-11	1998
China	Shenyang Aerospace	J-15	2013
China	Chengdu Aerospace	J-20	2017
India	Hindustan Aeronautics Limited	Su-30MKI	2002
Germany/Italy/Spain/U.K.	Eurofighter GmbH	Typhoon	2003

== See also ==
- Interceptor aircraft
- Fighter aircraft
