= General Electric F404 =

Afterburning turbofan aircraft engine

F404 / F412
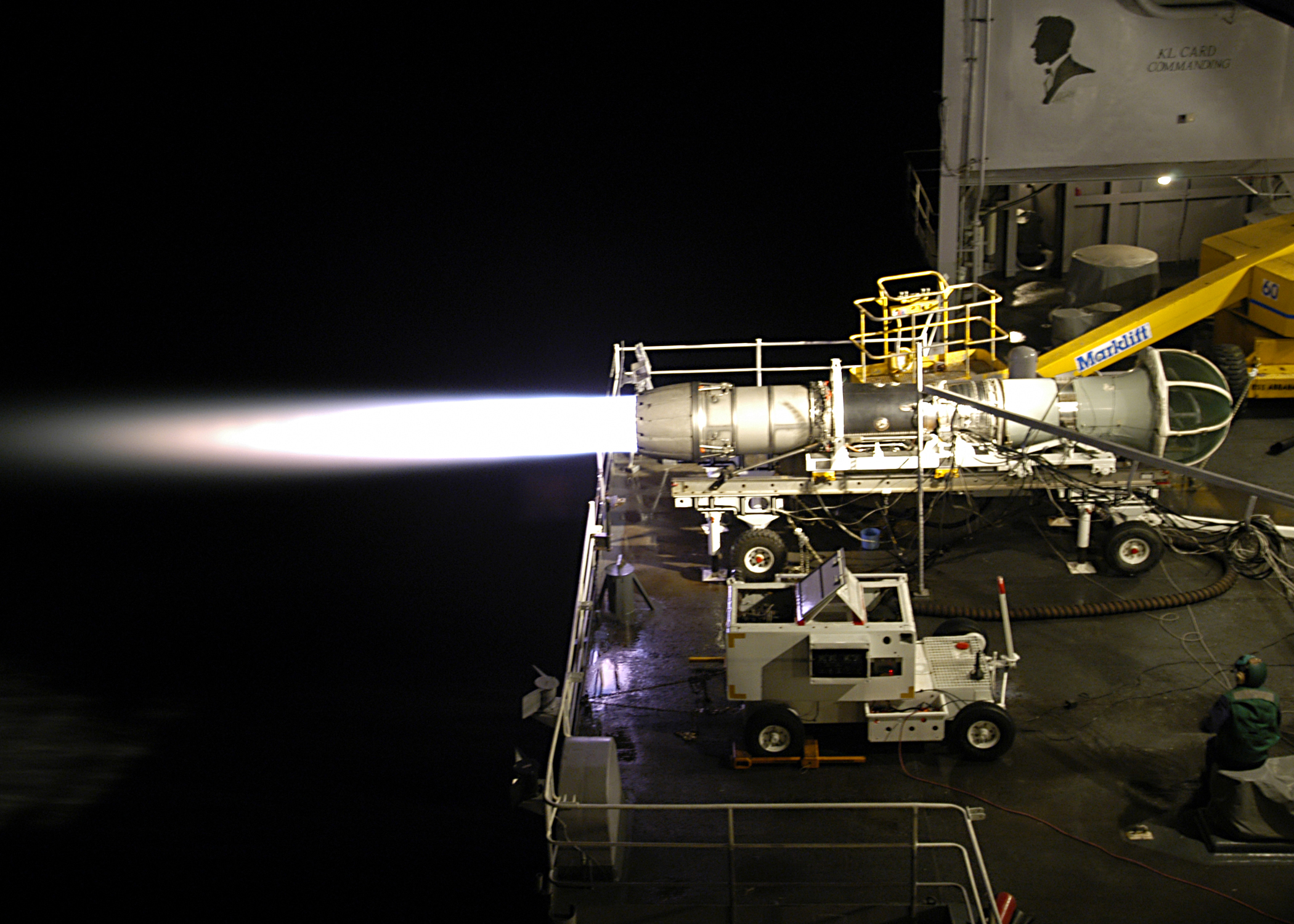
- An F404 turbofan being tested on board an aircraft carrier
- Type: Turbofan
- National origin: United States
- Manufacturer: General Electric
- First run: 1978
- Major applications: Boeing–Saab T-7 Red Hawk; HAL Tejas Mk 1/1A; KAI T-50 Golden Eagle; Lockheed F-117 Nighthawk; McDonnell Douglas F/A-18 Hornet; Northrop F-20 Tigershark; TAI Hurjet
- Developed from: General Electric YJ101
- Developed into: General Electric F414; General Electric GE36; General Electric LM1600
- Variants: Volvo RM12

The General Electric F404 and F412 are a family of afterburning turbofan engines in the 10,500–19,000 lbf (47–85 kN) class (static thrust). The series is produced by GE Aerospace. Partners include Volvo Aero, which builds the RM12 variant. The F404 was developed into the larger F414 turbofan, as well as the experimental GE36 civil propfan.

== Design and development ==
=== F404 ===
GE developed the F404 for the F/A-18 Hornet, shortly after losing the competition for the F-15 Eagle's engine to Pratt & Whitney, and losing the Lightweight Fighter (LWF) competition to the Pratt & Whitney F100 powered YF-16. For the F/A-18, GE based the F404 on the YJ101 engine they had developed for the Northrop YF-17, enlarging the bypass ratio from 0.20 to 0.34 to enable higher fuel efficiency. The engine consists of a three-staged fan, seven axial stage compressor arrangement, single stage low and high pressure turbines, an augmentor, and produces maximum thrust of 16,000 lbf (71.2 kN) in the original F404-GE-400 model. The engine was designed with a higher priority on reliability than performance. Cost was the main goal in the design of the engine.

GE also analyzed "throttle profiles" and found that pilots were changing throttle settings far more often than engineers previously expected, putting undue stress on the engines. GE also sought with the F404 a design that would avoid compressor stalls and other engine failures, and would respond quickly to control inputs; a common complaint of pilots converting from propeller planes to jets was that early turbojets were not responsive to changes in thrust input. GE executives Frederick A. Larson and Paul Setts also set the goal that the new engine would be smaller than the F-4's GE J79, but provide at least as much thrust, and cost half as much as the P&W F100 engine for the F-16.

Due to a fan designed to smooth airflow before it enters the compressor, the F404 has high resistance to compressor stalls, even at high angles of attack. It requires less than two shop visits per 1,000 flight hours and averages 6,500 hours between in-flight events. It also demonstrates high responsiveness to control inputs, spooling from idle to full afterburner in 4 seconds. The engine contains an in-flight engine condition monitoring system (IECMS) that monitors for critical malfunctions and keeps track of parts lifetimes.

GE developed the F110 for the Air Force as an alternative to the Pratt & Whitney F100 for use on the F-16 and F-15 based on the F101 and used F404 technology. The F110 was derived from the F101 via the F101DFE, though some elements of the F404 such as the design of the fan, albeit enlarged, were incorporated, per the F110 page and other sources. GE developed the F404-GE-402 in response to a Swiss requirement for more power in its F/A-18 version; it produces a maximum of 17,700 lbf (78.7 kN) of thrust with afterburner. The new engine version was used on Kuwaiti Hornets, later U.S. C and D Hornets, and subsequent Hornets. The KAI T-50 Golden Eagle uses a single General Electric F404-GE-102 turbofan engine with Full Authority Digital Engine Control (FADEC) system; the engine is similar to the F404-402, but with additional redundancies built in for single-engine operations. The aircraft has a maximum speed of Mach 1.5.

The General Electric F404-GE-103 is the latest derivative of the F404 engine family, developed for use in advanced trainer and light combat aircraft. It was originally developed for the Boeing T-7A Red Hawk, and is also used in the Turkish Aerospace Hürjet. The -103 variant includes safety features tailored for single-engine operations and incorporates a Full Authority Digital Electronic Control (FADEC) system derived from the GE F414 engine.

Almost 4,000 F404 engines power the F/A-18 Hornets in service worldwide. The F404 engine family had totaled over 12 million flight hours by 2010.

=== F404-GE-IN20 ===
For the HAL Tejas, GE developed an uprated F404-IN20, which is the highest thrust variant in F404 family, and which produces a maximum of 85 kN (19,000 lbf) of thrust with afterburner. It incorporates latest hot section materials and technologies as well as a FADEC system for reliable power and performance. General Electric had been collaborating with Aeronautical Development Agency (ADA) for the Tejas programme since 1980s while the engine variant was chosen to power the jets in 2004.

India bought 10 F404-F2J3 which is used on 2 technology demonstrators and 6 prototypes of the Tejas in early 2000s. Two deals for 17 and 24 engines for powering LSP (including Naval prototypes) and Mk 1 IOC variants of Tejas was signed in 2004 and 2007, respectively. By 2016, 75 engines (including F2J3 and IN20 variants) have been delivered to India. Deliveries of the engines were completed between 2008 and 2016.

On 17 August 2021, India signed a contract with GE worth ₹5,375 crore (equivalent to ₹66 billion or US$700 million in 2026) to supply 99 F404 engines and service support by 2029.

However, General Electric had closed down the production line of F404-IN20 engines without further prospects of orders from India and the first engine was yet to be delivered as of October 2024 leading to the subsequent delivery delays of HAL Tejas Mk1A to the Indian Air Force. First engine delivery dates were delayed to September 2024 as of then. Following the orders a lengthy process of sorting out supply chain problems was undertaken and the production line at Boston restarted by late 2024 to enable deliveries after a stagnation of 5 years.

As of July 2025, a total of 12 engines were expected to be delivered in the fiscal year at two units a month until March 2026. However, the delivery schedule was again revised to one engine a month till October followed by two engines monthly thereafter. The August deadline for third engine was also missed and GE had committed to deliver three to five engines by October. The target of 11 engines in the fiscal year of 2025–26 was not maintained.

On 26 June 2026, the sixth engine reportedly failed to meet mandatory acceptance parameters during routine post-delivery quality inspections. Thereafter, HAL, the customer, sought a "rectification" of the engine. The issues were resolved by the time the seventh engine arrived in India in July and all the delivered units are fully operational.

Three engines were delivered in August 2026, taking the total number delivered to 10 units. GE has reportedly assured the delivery of 12 more engines by December 2026.

Delivery dates of the first tranche of Tejas Mk 1A engines
Engine No.	Delivered on	Notes	Ref.
1	25 March 2025	Two years behind schedule.	
2	14 July 2025	Next engine was expected in August.	
3	11 September 2025	Next engine was expected by month-end.	
4	1 October 2025		
5	5 December 2025		
6	March 2026		
7	13 July 2026		
8–10 (+3)	August 2026		
11–14 (+4)	September 2026		
15	November 2026		

It was projected that HAL would place an extra $1 billion order in September for 113 engines and related services for 97 Tejas Mk1A. The agreement was subsequently signed on 7 November 2025. It is anticipated that the deliveries will begin in 2027 and will be completed by 2032.

=== F412 ===
GE developed the F404 into the F412-GE-400 non-afterburning turbofan for the McDonnell Douglas A-12 Avenger II. After the cancellation of the A-12, the research was directed toward an engine for the Super Hornet, which evolved into the F414.

== Applications ==
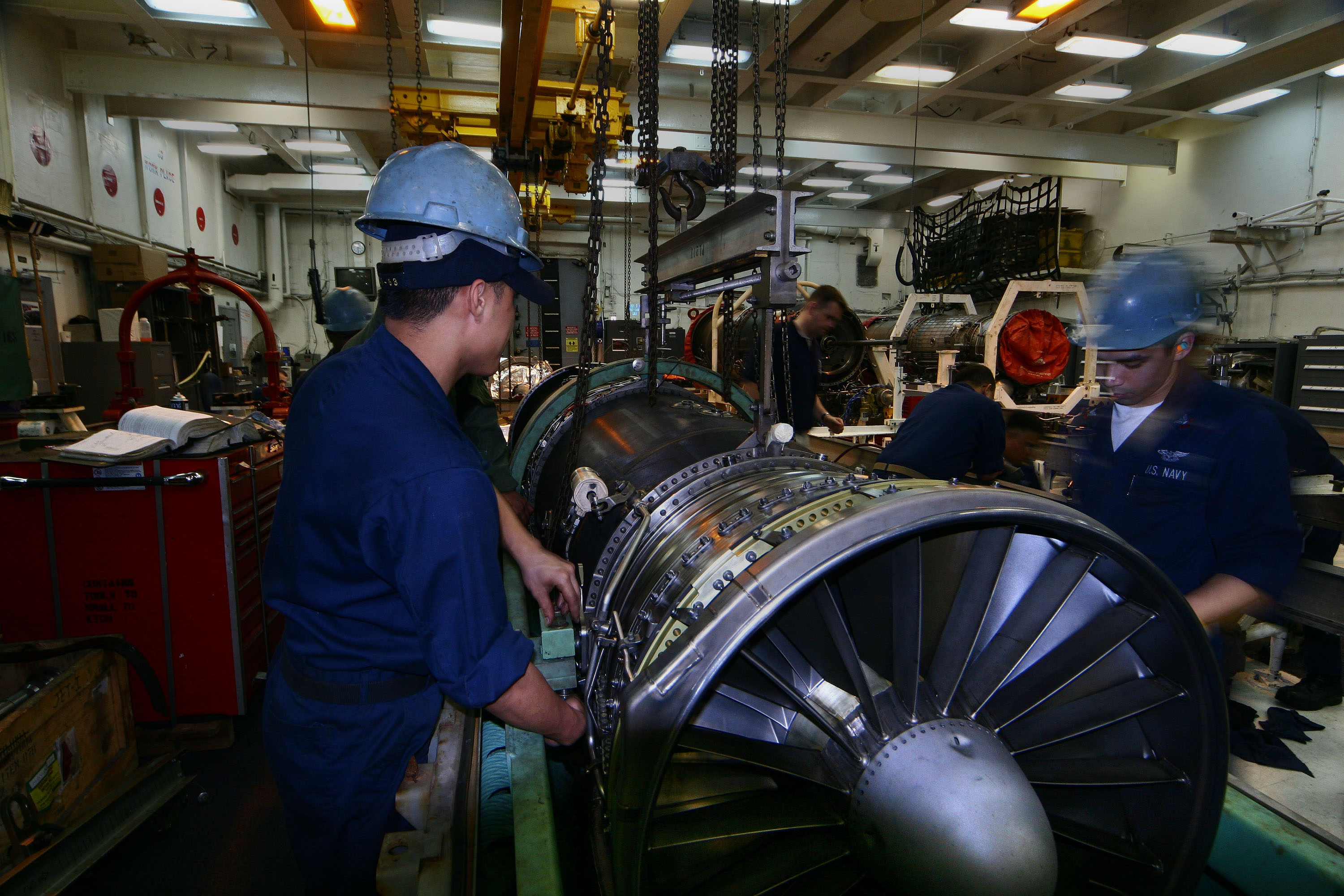
Sailors lower an F/A-18 Hornet engine into its container aboard the USS Kitty Hawk (CV-63)

F404

- Boeing Phantom Ray
- Boeing X-45C
- Boeing–Saab T-7 Red Hawk
- FMA SAIA 90 (as designed, not built)
- Dassault Rafale A (prototype only)
- Grumman A-6F Intruder II
- Grumman X-29
- HAL Tejas Mk 1/1A
- Lockheed F-117 Nighthawk
- KAI T-50 Golden Eagle
- McDonnell Douglas F/A-18 Hornet (A-D)
- Northrop F-20 Tigershark
- Scaled Composites Model 400
- Rockwell-MBB X-31
- ST Aerospace A-4SU Super Skyhawk
- TAI Hürjet

F412

- McDonnell Douglas A-12 Avenger II (as designed, not built)

== Specifications (F404-GE-402) ==
Data from General Electric

==== General characteristics ====
- Type: Afterburning Turbofan
- Length: 154 in (391 cm)
- Diameter: 35 in (89 cm) overall, 28 in (71 cm) inlet
- Dry weight: 2,282 lb (1,035 kg)

==== Components ====
- Compressor: Axial, with 3 Fan and 7 HP stages
- Combustors: Annular
- Turbine: 1 LP and 1 HP stage

==== Performance ====
- Maximum thrust:
  - 11,000 lbf (48.9 kN) military thrust
  - 17,700 lbf (78.7 kN) wet thrust
- Overall pressure ratio: 26:1
- Bypass ratio: 0.34:1
- Air mass flow: 146 lb/s (66.2 kg/s)
- Specific fuel consumption:
  - Military thrust: 0.81 lb/(lbf⋅h) (23 g/(kN⋅s))
  - Full afterburner: 1.74 lb/(lbf⋅h) (49 g/(kN⋅s))
- Thrust-to-weight ratio:
  - 4.8 (Dry)
  - 7.75 (Afterburning)

== Specifications (F404-GE-IN20) ==
Data from General Electric

==== General characteristics ====
- Type: Afterburning Turbofan
- Length: 154 in (391 cm)
- Diameter: 35 in (89 cm) overall, 28 in (71 cm) inlet
- Dry weight: 2,365 lb (1,073 kg)

==== Components ====
- Compressor: Axial, with 3 Fan and 7 HP stages
- Combustors: Annular
- Turbine: 1 LP and 1 HP stage

==== Performance ====
- Maximum thrust:
  - 12,139 lbf (54.0 kN) military thrust
  - 19,000 lbf (84.5 kN) wet thrust
- Overall pressure ratio: 28:1
- Air mass flow: 153 lb/s (70 kg/s)
- Thrust-to-weight ratio:
  - 5.13 (Dry)
  - 8.03 (Afterburning)

== See also ==
Related development

- General Electric YJ101
- General Electric F414
- General Electric F110
- Volvo RM12

Comparable engines

- GTRE GTX-35VS Kaveri (1996)
- Guizhou WS-13 (2006)
- Klimov RD-33 (1974)
- Snecma M88 (1989)
- Turbo-Union RB199 (1971)

Related lists

- List of aircraft engines
