= Rolls-Royce Avon =

1940s British turbojet aircraft engine

Avon
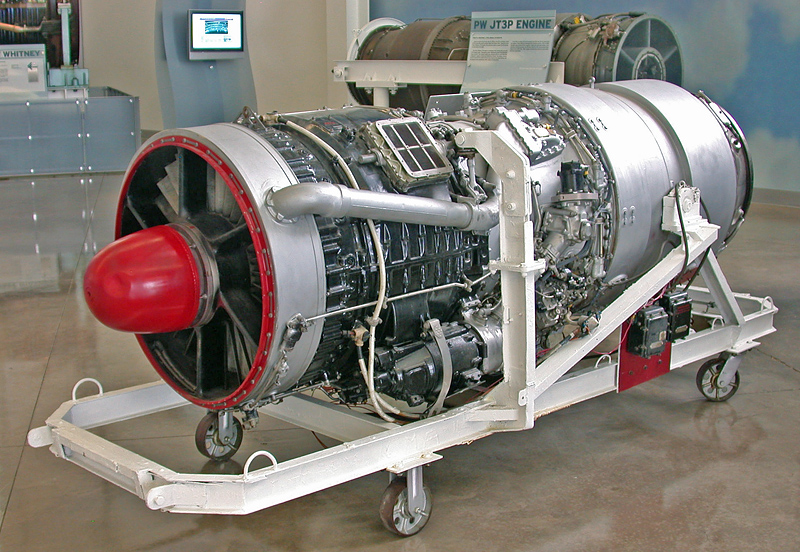
- Rolls-Royce Avon
- Type: Turbojet
- National origin: United Kingdom
- Manufacturer: Rolls-Royce Limited
- First run: 25 March 1947
- Major applications: CAC Sabre; de Havilland Comet; de Havilland Sea Vixen; English Electric Canberra; English Electric Lightning; Hawker Hunter; Saab 32 Lansen; Saab 35 Draken; Sud Aviation Caravelle; Vickers Valiant
- Number built: >11,000

The Rolls-Royce Avon was the first axial flow jet engine designed and produced by Rolls-Royce. Introduced in 1950, the engine went on to become one of their most successful post-World War II engine designs. It was used in a wide variety of aircraft, both military and civilian, as well as versions for stationary and maritime power.

An English Electric Canberra powered by two Avons made the first un-refuelled non-stop transatlantic flight by a jet, and a British Overseas Airways Corporation (BOAC) de Havilland Comet 4 powered by four Avons made the first scheduled transatlantic crossing by a jet airliner.

Production of the Avon aero engine version ended after 24 years in 1974. Production of the Avon-derived industrial version continues to this day, by Siemens since 2015.

The current version of the Avon, the Avon 200, is an industrial gas generator that is rated at 21,000–22,000 shp (15.7–16.4 MW). As of 2011, 1,200 Industrial Avons have been sold, and the type has established a 60,000,000 hour record for its class.

== Design and development ==
The engine was initially a private venture put forward for the English Electric Canberra. Originally known as the AJ.65 for Axial Jet, 6,500 lbf the engine was based on an initial project concept by Alan Arnold Griffith. which combined an axial compressor with a combustion system and single-stage turbine using principles proven in the Rolls-Royce Nene engine.

Design work began in 1945. The Avon design team was initially headed by Stanley Hooker assisted by Geoff Wilde. Development of the engine was moved from Barnoldswick to Derby in 1948 and Hooker subsequently left the company, moving to Bristol Engines.

The first engine ran on 25 March 1947, with a 12-stage compressor. The engine was difficult to start, would not accelerate and broke first-stage blades. Two-position inlet guide vanes and compressor bleed were among the design changes which allowed the engine, as the RA.2, to run a 25-hour test and fly in the two outboard positions on the converted Avro Lancastrian VM732, from Hucknall on 15 August 1948.

The first production engine, which needed a two-stage turbine, was the RA.3, or Avon Mk 101. Several modified versions of this design were produced in the Mk. 100 series.

The Avon 200 series was a complete redesign having very little in common with earlier Marks. Differences included a completely new combustion section and a 15-stage compressor based on that of the Armstrong-Siddeley Sapphire. The first application was the Vickers Valiant.

== Operational history ==
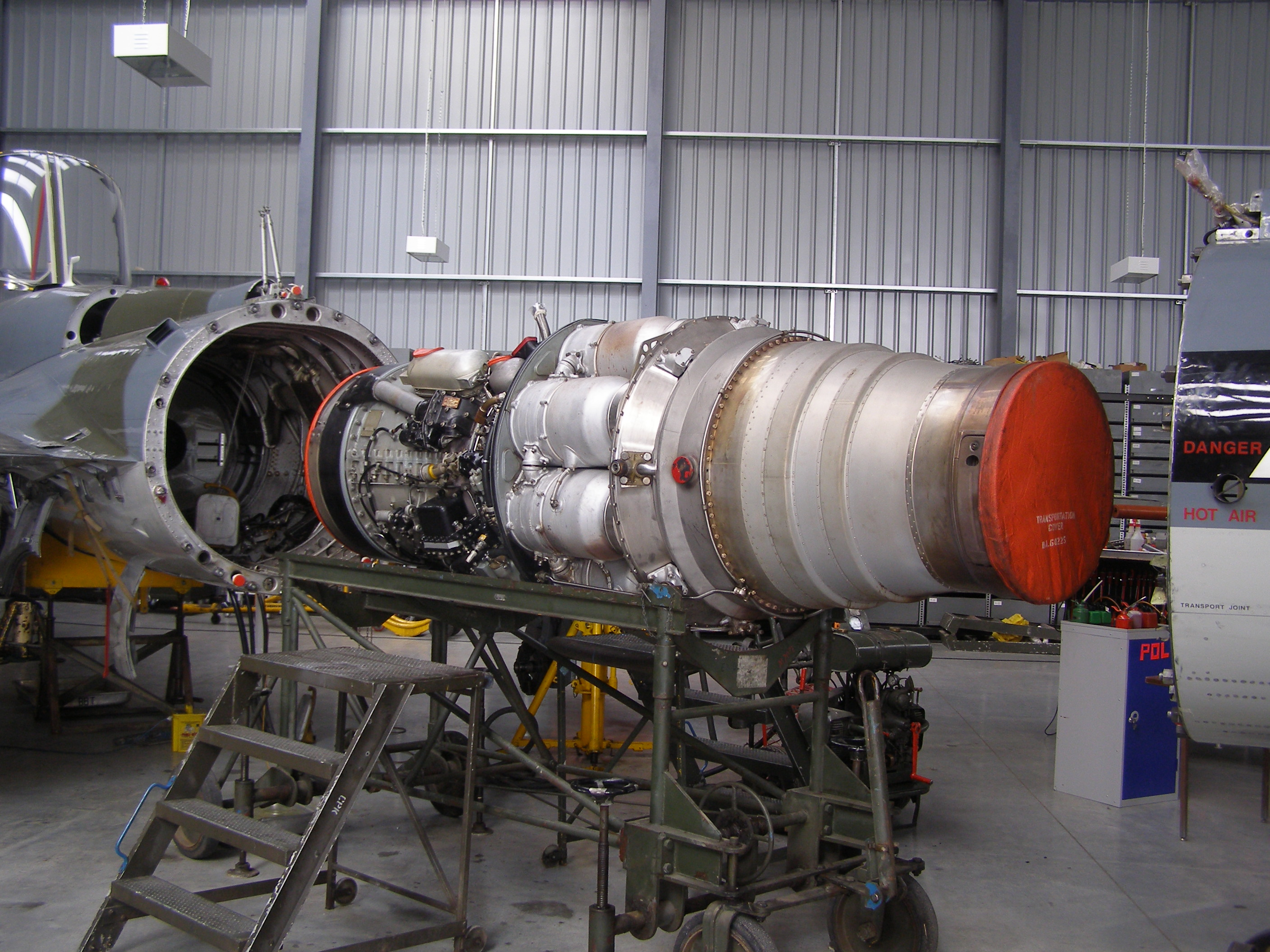
A Mark 122 – The rear fuselage of the Hawker Hunter can be removed for engine maintenance

The engine entered production in 1950 as the RA.3/Mk.101 with 6,500 lbf (29 kN) thrust in the English Electric Canberra B.2. Similar versions were used in the Canberra B.6, Hawker Hunter and Supermarine Swift. Uprated versions followed, the RA.7/Mk.114 with 7,350 lbf (32,700 N) thrust in the de Havilland Comet C.2, the RA.14/Mk.201, 9,500 lbf (42 kN) in the Vickers Valiant and the RA.26, 10,000 lbf (44 kN) used in the Comet C.3 and Hawker Hunter F.6. An Avon-powered de Havilland Comet 4 flew the first scheduled transatlantic jet service in 1958. The highest thrust version was the RA.29 Mk.301/2 (RB.146) used in later versions of the English Electric Lightning. It produced 12,690 and 17,110 lbf (56,400 and 76,100 N) with afterburning. Other aircraft to use the Avon included the de Havilland Sea Vixen, Supermarine Scimitar and Fairey Delta2.

The RA.3/Mk.109 was produced under licence by Svenska Flygmotor as the RM5, and an uprated RA.29 as the RM6 with 17,110 lbf (76,100 N) thrust. The RM5 powered the Saab 32 Lansen and the RM6 powered the Saab 35 Draken and all-weather fighter version of the Lansen (J 32B).

300 Avon 113s, and a larger number of Avon 203s were produced under licence in Belgium by Fabrique Nationale Division Moteurs .

In the US the RA.28-49 was used in the VTOL Ryan X-13 Vertijet aircraft.

In Australia, the Avon was used by Commonwealth Aircraft Corporation in the CA-27 Avon-Sabre.

The Avon continued in production for the Sud Aviation Caravelle and English Electric (BAC) Lightning until 1974, by which time over 11,000 had been built. It remained in operational service with the RAF until 23 June 2006 in the English Electric Canberra PR.9.

Initial design work was done on the 2-spool RB.106/RB.128 as an Avon successor for large supersonic fighters.

== Variants and designations ==
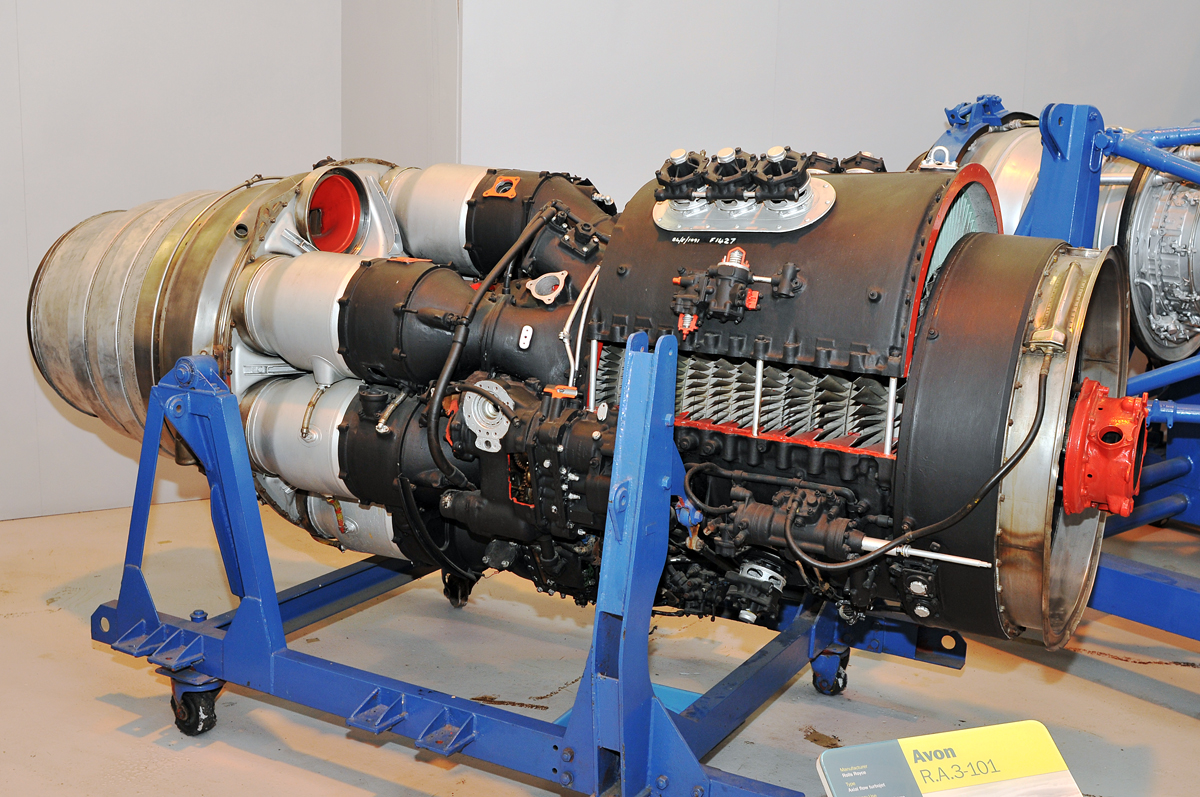
Rolls Royce Avon RA.3 Mk.101 at RAF Museum Cosford

Thrust given in foot-pounds (lbf) and kilonewtons (kN) or kilogram-force (kp).

AJ65
The original designation, standing for Axial Jet 6,500 lbf thrust
RA.1
Prototype engines for testing and development. RA standing for Rolls-Royce Avon.
RA.2
Pre-production engines for testing – 6,000 lbf (27 kN)
RA.3
Civil designation for the first Avon production mark. First avon with a two-stage turbine. – 6,500 lbf (29 kN)
RA.7
Civil designation for the uprated version of the Avon RA.3. Electrically started. – 7,350 lbf (32.7 kN)
RA.7R
RA.7 with reheat. Meant for use with an afterburner. Explosive-cartridge started. – 7,200–7,500 lbf (3,250–3,400 kp) without afterburner, 9,090–9,740 lbf (4,125–4,420 kp) with afterburner.
RA.14
Civil designation for the uprated version of the Avon with can-annular combustion chamber and Sapphire style compressor – 9,500 lbf (42 kN)
RA.14R
RA.14 with reheat. – 9,500 lbf (4,300 kp) without afterburner, 12,300 lbf (5,590 kp) with afterburner.
RA.19
RA.19R
RA.19 with reheat. – 12,500 lbf (5,669 kp) with afterburner.
RA.21
Production engine developed from the RA.7 – 8,050 lbf (35.8 kN)
RA.21R
Production engine developed from the RA.7R. Same as the Avon Mk.21. – 7,600 lbf (3,460 kp) without afterburner, 9,690 lbf (4,394 kp) with afterburner.
RA.23R
RA.23 with reheat. – 10,000 lbf (4,535 kp) without afterburner, 13,000 lbf (5,895 kp) with afterburner.
RA.24
RA.24R
Same as the Avon Mk.47A.
RA.25
Civil Mk.503
RA.26
Further improvements to the Avon 200 series – Civil Mk.521
RA.28
Second generation variant – 10,000 lbf (44 kN)
RA.29
Civil designation for the Mk.300 series (used by the Sud Aviation Caravelle)
RA.29/1
RA.29/3
RA.29/6
Same as the Avon Mk.533 – 12,725 lbf (56.60 kN)
RB.146
Rolls-Royce designation for Avon Series 300

=== Avon Series 100 ===
Avon Series 100 are early military versions of the Avon.

Avon Mk.100
Military designation for the RA.3 Avon – 6,500 lbf (29 kN)
Avon Mk.101C
6,600 lbf (3,000 kp)
Avon Mk.113
Avon Mk.114
Military designation for the RA.7 Avon – 7,350 lbf (32.7 kN)
Avon Mk.115
Same as the Avon Mk.23 – 8,000 lbf (3,630 kp)
Avon Mk.117
Avon Mk.118
Avon Mk.121
Avon Mk.20
Australian version built on license by CAC for the CAC Sabre Mk.31 – 7,500 lbf (33 kN)
Avon Mk.21
Afterburning Swedish version built by RR and on license by SFA for the Saab 32A/C. Same as the RA.21R. Designated RM5A1. – 3,460 kp (7,600 lbf) without afterburner, 4,445–4,700 kp (9,800–10,360 lbf) with different afterburners.
Avon Mk.21A
Improved Mk.21 with increased diameter on the engine outlet for more power. Built by RR and on license by SFA for the Saab 32A/C. Designated RM5A2. – 7,600 lbf (3,460 kp) without afterburner, 9,800–10,360 lbf (4,445–4,700 kp) with different afterburners.
Avon Mk.23
Same as the Avon Mk.115. Non-afterburning Swedish version built by RR for the Hawker Hunter Mk.50. Designated RM5B1. – 7,760 lbf (3,519 kp)
Avon Mk.24
Non-afterburning Swedish version built by RR for the Hawker Hunter Mk.50. Designated RM5B2.
Avon Mk.25
Non-afterburning Swedish version built by RR for the Hawker Hunter Mk.50. Designated RM5B3.
Avon Mk.26
Australian version built by CAC for the CAC Sabre Mk.32 – 7,500 lbf (33 kN)

=== Avon Series 200 ===
Avon Series 200 are uprated military versions of the Avon with can-annular combustion chamber and Sapphire style compressor.

Avon Mk.200
– 9,500 lbf (42 kN)
Avon Mk.207
– 10,145 lbf (45.13 kN)
Avon Mk.47A
Afterburning Swedish version built by RR and on license by SFA for the Saab 32B. Same as the RA.24R. Designated RM6A. – 10,800 lbf (4,880 kp) without afterburner, 6,500 kp (14,000 lbf) with afterburner.
Avon Mk.48A
Afterburning Swedish version built by RR and on license by SFA for the Saab 35A/B/C. Designated RM6B. – 10,800 lbf (4,890 kp) without afterburner, 14,410 lbf (6,535 kp) with afterburner.

=== Avon Series 300 ===
Avon Series 300 are further developed military after-burning versions of the Avon for the English Electric Lightning.

Avon Mk.300
– 12,690 lbf (56.4 kN)
Avon Mk.301
The ultimate Military Avon for the English Electric Lightning – 12,690 lbf (56.4 kN) dry, 17,110 lbf (76.1 kN) wet.
Avon Mk.302
Essentially similar to the Mk.301
Avon Mk.60
Afterburning Swedish version built by RR and on license by SFA for the Saab 35 Draken D/F. Same as the RA.29R. Designated RM6C. – 12,710 lbf (5,765 kp) without afterburner, 17,000 lbf (7,800 kp) with afterburner.
Westinghouse XJ54
Avon 300-series scaled-down by Westinghouse to 105 lb/sec airflow to produce 6,200 lb thrust.

=== Avon Series 500 ===
Avon Series 500 are civilian equivalents to the military Avon Series 200 variants.

Avon Mk.504
Avon Mk.506
Avon Mk.521
Avon Mk.522
Avon Mk.524
Avon Mk.524B
Avon Mk.525
Avon Mk.525B
Avon Mk.527
Avon Mk.527B
Avon Mk.530
Avon Mk.531
Avon Mk.531B
Avon Mk.532R
Avon Mk.532R-B
Avon Mk.533
Same as the RA.29/6 – 12,725 lbf (56.60 kN)
Avon Mk.533R
12,600 lbf (56 kN)
Avon Mk.533R-11A

=== Swedish designations ===
Reaktionsmotor 3A – RM3A
Swedish designation for the Avon Mk.101C
Reaktionsmotor 5A1 – RM5A1
Swedish designation for the Avon Mk.21
Reaktionsmotor 5A2 – RM5A2
Swedish designation for the Avon Mk.21A
Reaktionsmotor 5B1 – RM5B1
Swedish designation for the Avon Mk.23
Reaktionsmotor 5B2 – RM5B2
Swedish designation for the Avon Mk.24
Reaktionsmotor 5B3 – RM5B3
Swedish designation for the Avon Mk.25
Reaktionsmotor 6A – RM6A
Swedish designation for the Avon Mk.47A
Reaktionsmotor 6B – RM6B
Swedish designation for the Avon Mk.48A
Reaktionsmotor 6C – RM6C
Swedish designation for the Avon Mk.60

== Applications ==
=== Military aviation ===
- CAC CA-23 (cancelled)
- CAC Sabre
- de Havilland Sea Vixen
- English Electric Canberra
- English Electric Lightning
- Fairey Delta 2
- Hawker Hunter
- Ryan X-13 Vertijet
- Saab 32 Lansen
- Saab 35 Draken
- Supermarine Swift
- Supermarine Scimitar
- Vickers Valiant

=== Civil aviation ===
- de Havilland Comet
- Lockheed L-193 (cancelled)
- Sud Aviation Caravelle

=== Other uses ===
- The Avon is also currently marketed as a compact, high reliability, stationary power source. As the AVON 1533, it has a maximum continuous output of 21,480 shp (16.02 MW) at 7,900 rpm and a thermal efficiency of 30%. An example can be found at Didcot Power Station in the United Kingdom where four Avon generators are used to provide Black start services to assist in a restart of the National Grid in the event of a system-wide failure, or to provide additional generating capacity in period of very high demand. Avon Mk.1533 gas turbines were used in a separate building on the site of the now-defunct Fiddlers Ferry Power Station.
- As a compact electrical generator, the type EAS1 Avon based generator can generate a continuous output of 14.9 MW.
- On 4 October 1983, Richard Noble's Thrust2 vehicle, powered by a single Rolls-Royce Avon 302 jet engine, set a new land-speed record of 1,019.46 km/h (633.46 mph) at the Black Rock Desert in Nevada.

== Surviving engines ==
- Several Avon-powered Hawker Hunter aircraft remain airworthy in private ownership in 2010.
- Thunder City in South Africa as of 2011 operated two Avon-powered English Electric Lightnings.
- SWAHF operates three Saab Lansen and two Saab Draken airworthy for air shows.

S&S Turbines in CYXJ(Fort St John BC) has at least 5 Avons in storage for rebuild. https://www.ssturbine.com/photo-gallery

== Engines on display ==
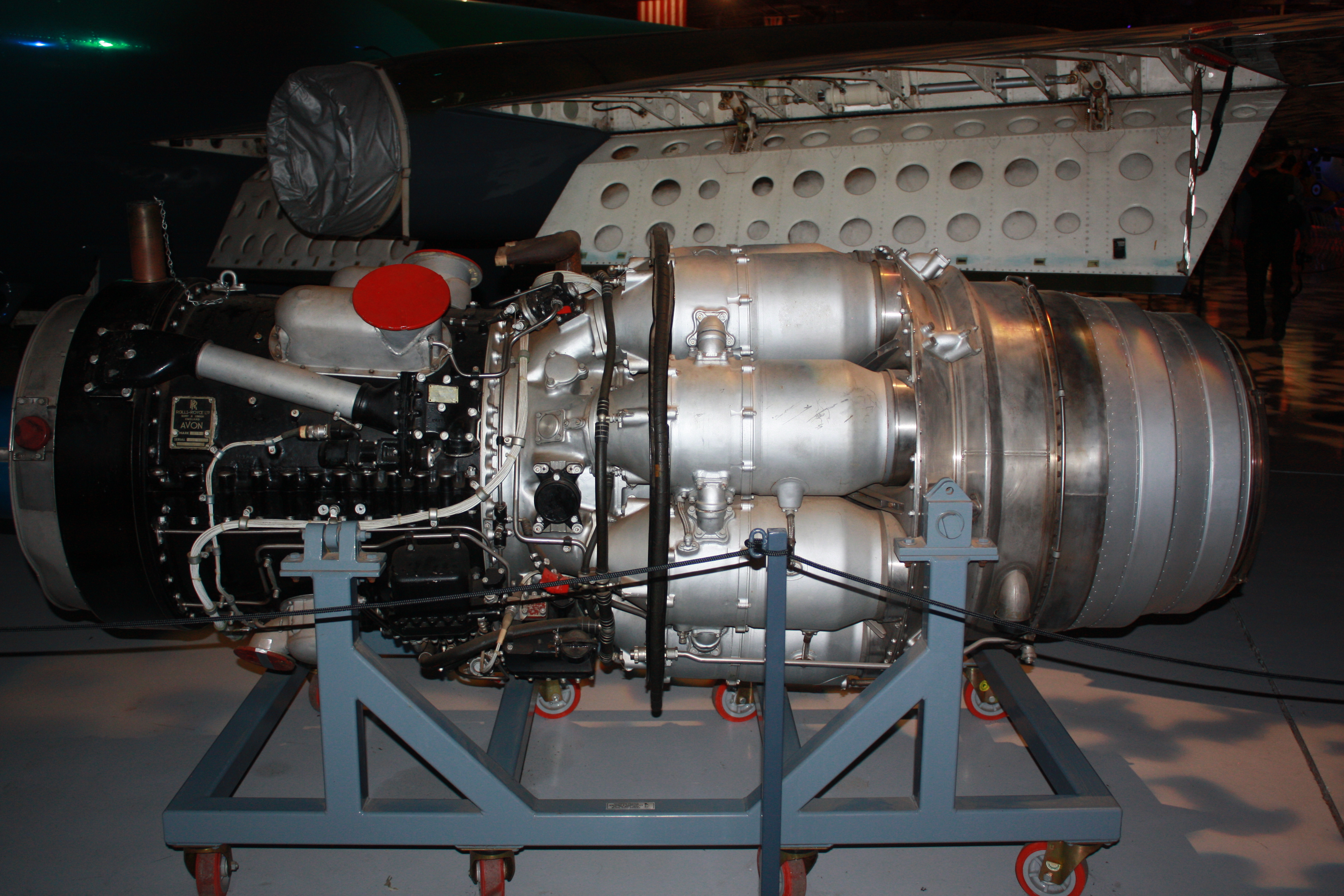
Rolls-Royce Avon engine at the Temora aviation museum, Australia

- A Rolls-Royce Avon Mk 1 is on display at Amrita University, Coimbatore, Tamil Nadu in the Department of Aerospace Engineering's Lab.
- A Mk 524 Avon has been restored at the Museo Nacional de Aeronáutica de Argentina by the Museum Friend's Association in Moron, Argentina and is now on display.
- An Avon Mk.203 was donated by Rolls-Royce to the National Museum of the United States Air Force in July 1986 for public display.
- A Rolls-Royce Avon is on public display at the Midland Air Museum.
- A preserved Rolls-Royce Avon Mk.203 is on display at the Royal Air Force Museum London.
- A partially sectioned Mk.101 Avon is on display at the Royal Air Force Museum Cosford.
- A Rolls-Royce Avon is on display at the Australian National Aviation Museum, Moorabbin, Victoria, Australia
- A Rolls-Royce Avon is on public display at East Midlands Aeropark
- A Rolls-Royce Avon is on display at the Fleet Air Arm Museum at RNAS Yeovilton.
- Several RR Avon engines are on display at the Queensland Air Museum, Caloundra, Australia
- A Rolls-Royce Avon engine is on public display at the Historical Aircraft Restoration Society museum at Illawarra Regional Airport, New South Wales, Australia.
- A Rolls-Royce Avon engine is on public display at the Parkes Aviation Museum in Parkes, New South Wales, Australia.
- A Rolls-Royce Avon is on display at the Classic Flyers Aircraft Museum, Mt Maunganui, Bay of Plenty, New Zealand.
- A Rolls-Royce Avon Mk.26 is on display at Mikes Dyno Tuning and Performance Engines, Dandenong, Victoria, Australia
- A Rolls-Royce Avon (GAF) is on display at the South Australian Aviation Museum, Port Adelaide, South Australia.
- A Rolls-Royce Avon is on public display in the car park (under cover) at South Lanarkshire College, East Kilbride as an exhibit about Nae Pasaran.
- A Rolls-Royce Avon MK 101 is on display at the entrance foyer of Faculty of Engineering, University of Peradeniya which was gifted by Professor Selvadurai Mahalingam
- A partially sectioned Avon is on public display at the City of Norwich Aviation Museum in Horsham St Faith, Norfolk.
- A Rolls-Royce Avon engine is on public display in The Charlesworth Transport Gallery, at Kelham Island Museum, Sheffield.

== Specifications (Avon 301R) ==
Data from "Lightning F.6 Avon 301R Specs". lightning.org.uk. Archived from the original on 10 April 2008.

==== General characteristics ====
- Type: turbojet
- Length: 126 in (3,200 mm)
- Diameter: 35.7 in (910 mm)
- Dry weight: 2,890 lb (1,310 kg)

==== Components ====
- Compressor: 15-stage axial flow
- Combustors: cannular, 150 lb/s (68 kg/s)
- Turbine: two-stage axial flow
- Fuel type: kerosene

==== Performance ====
- Maximum thrust: 12,690 lbf (56.4 kN) dry, 16,360 lbf (72.8 kN) with reheat
- Overall pressure ratio: 7.45:1
- Specific fuel consumption: 0.932 lb/(lbf⋅h) or 26.4 g/(kN⋅s) (dry); 1.853 lb/(lbf⋅h) or 52.5 g/(kN⋅s) (wet)
- Thrust-to-weight ratio: 5.66

== See also ==
Comparable engines

- Armstrong Siddeley Sapphire
- Pratt & Whitney J57

Related lists

- List of aircraft engines
