= Industrigruppen JAS =

Swedish industrial consortium

Industrigruppen JAS AB (IG JAS AB) was a Swedish industrial consortium under executive director Harald Schröder founded in August 1980 by Saab-Scania (later Saab), Volvo Flygmotor, LM Ericsson, Svenska Radioaktiebolaget Communications and Förenade Fabriksverken (FFV) for the development, construction and manufacturing of the new Swedish combat aircraft JAS 39 Gripen on behalf of the Swedish Air Force. The tender was submitted in June 1981 to Försvarets Materielverk (FMV), and on 30 June 1982 a contract was signed for development, and for five prototype aircraft and 30 production aircraft.

Between 2006 and 2009 all participating companies save Volvo Aero was either bought out, or purchased by and merged into Saab. The consortium was dissolved under executive director Lennart Sindahl after the delivery of the third and final batch consisting of 64 aircraft JAS 39C and 14 aircraft JAS39D, as the sole purpose was fulfilled.

== Sources ==
References in Swedish:

- Svenskt militärhistoriskt bibliotek
- ÖstgötaCorrespondenten
