= VFAX =

United States naval aviation projects

General information
- Project for: Light fighter
- Issued by: United States Navy

History
- Successors: Navy Air Combat Fighter

VFAX for Naval Fighter Attack Experimental was two specifications for two US Navy fighter projects. The first was for a low cost lightweight complement for the General Dynamics–Grumman F-111B which could replace the McDonnell F-4 Phantom II for air superiority, escort, and ground attack missions in the early 1960s. This role was dropped in favor of the VFX aircraft, which emerged as the F-14 Tomcat. The second VFAX evolved when the VFX proved too costly to replace all existing USN fighters and attack aircraft, and the Navy was invited to take part in the USAFs Lightweight Fighter Program (LWF). The Navy chose the YF-17, the loser of the LWF contest as its Navy Air Combat Fighter, as it was inherently more suitable to naval operations than the winning General Dynamics F-16 Fighting Falcon; it was redesigned to become the McDonnell Douglas F/A-18 Hornet.

== Overview ==
VFAX was essentially the Navy counterpart to the Air Force's FX study which eventually led to the F-15 Eagle air superiority fighter. The F-111B had no rear visibility and was found to be too heavy and ungainly in a dogfight. It was not even slated to carry a simple gun or AIM-9 Sidewinder normally carried by air superiority fighters like the F-8 Crusader. Even the F-4 Phantom II did not achieve the success that the US enjoyed over Korean MiGs. It was thought that a mix of F-111B and lighter advanced fighter bombers could handle all anticipated threats in close and long range combat.

As a company project, Grumman was well aware of the limitations of the F-111B, but their approach to the VFAX was the Grumman 303 design. It essentially transplanted the engines and AWG-9/AIM-54 Phoenix weapons system of the F-111B into an agile airframe with the same tried and proved components of the A-6 Intruder, such as the landing gear and primary attitude reference. It would have to be capable of defeating the Soviet MiG-17 'Fresco' and MiG-19 'Farmer' fighters encountered by Navy pilots after 1965 over Vietnam. After 1967, it would also have to defeat the next generation Soviet fighters as well. By 1966, the Navy had been persuaded that a single VFAX could meet the specification if it were large enough to carry the AWG-9/Phoenix weapons system. The VFAX was quickly dropped in favor of a hastily rewritten VFX specification which was largely built around the 303. The VFX, it was thought, was a better and cheaper alternative to a fleet of F-111B FADF (fleet air defence) dedicated interceptors and lighter fighter bombers. Needless to say, this greatly accelerated the need to cancel the now superfluous F-111B.

When the final classifications of the VAFX/VFX was released it was composed of the following, with Air Superiority (Visual maneuvering close combat) as the first priority, ahead of FADF.

1. Air superiority
2. Fleet Air Defence FADF
3. Attack Escort
4. Air to Ground Attack
5. Long loiter time
6. Range
7. Approach speed to the carrier

== Maneuverability ==
In order to avoid being forced to accept the F-X specification then being developed by the USAF, the Navy insisted on an airplane uncompromised by the air superiority requirements. This was actually a code phrase which meant retaining the primary FADF capability of the relatively heavy Phoenix missile. If the F-14 was created to shoot down bombers, and it was not optimized for maneuvering air combat as the primary design goal, it has even been suggested that the F-14's extraordinary maneuverability is due to the accident of a low approach speed requirement.

However, the Grumman design was able to create a design in which the FDAF and AS requirements did not significantly compromise each other. The F-14 would use a wing sweep program to optimize lift and drag at all combat speeds, twin tails for stability, greatly reduced weight through extensive use of titanium to achieve a better thrust to weight ratio than the F-4, a pancake fuselage for increased lift, a raised tandem cockpit for reduced drag and increased visibility, a gun for close-in fighting, and widely spaced engines for weapons carriage and survivability. Though as the first of a new generation of air superiority fighters, it would be criticized for not possessing the desired 1:1 combat thrust to weight ratio as was intended in the proposed upgraded F-14B and F-14C, it would prove to be competitive in training against a variety of competitors throughout its service life, especially at low speeds with a fully forward wing at full afterburner.

When accepted by the Navy after a competition, the VFAX and VFX would become the F-14 Tomcat, the first dedicated US Navy air superiority design since the F-8 Crusader. The F-14 would be tasked as the Navy's only primary air superiority fighter as well as FADF interceptor throughout its service life. Doctrine would strip the F-14 of any ground attack role until very late in its career, with the retirement of the A-6 Intruder and Air Force deployment of the similar F-15E Strike Eagle.

== Revival ==
VFAX was revived in the 1970s when it was realized that although the F-14 was smaller than the F-111B, it was still a very large plane. The F-14 was deemed too expensive to replace all of the attack fighters and USMC F-4 Phantom IIs, which had passed on the Tomcat's cost and initial lack of ground attack capability (which the fighter wouldn't get until the 1990s). The VFAX would later be folded into the USAF LWF lightweight fighter competition. The Navy would choose the loser of the USAF competition, the YF-17. It was the product of a long evolution of the Northrop Cobra project, which was a radical redesign that used the wings and nose of the tiny F-5 Freedom Fighter as a design starting point. Attracted by the safety and growth potential of two engines, it was developed into the F/A-18 Hornet as the low end of a high low mix. Like the F-4 Phantom II, it would have conformal carriage for the radar guided AIM-7 Sparrow (and later AMRAAM) missiles. In the 1990s, the original Cobra design would be stretched yet again into the heavier Super Hornet. The F/A-18E/F would be deemed by 2006 to have enough capability to replace its senior stablemate, the VFX F-14 Tomcat in the primary air superiority role, along with most other jet combat, EW and tanker support types.

Dogged by complaints that the F-18 lacked "legs" or range, the Navy later opted for the F/A-18E/F to replace the A-12 Avenger, which in turn was meant to replace the A-6 Intruder. While there were no precise reasons, the Navy and the Secretary of Defense opted to buy no more new Tomcats or its variants. While the Navy studied a swing wing version of the Air Force F-22, they opted not to develop a direct replacement of the F-14 Tomcat. The fire and forget capability of the new AMRAAM missile would give the Super Hornet much of the capability of the powerful, but old AIM-54 Phoenix system.

Together with the F/A-18A and the anticipated retirement of other aircraft types, Hornets and Super Hornets will take on roles of aircraft since Vietnam of the A-1, A-4 and A-7 light attack, F-8 light, F-4 medium, and F-14 heavy fighters, RA-5C and RF-8 reconnaissance, KA-3 and KA-6 tankers, EA-6B jammers, and S-3 ASW aircraft, or just about all jet combat aircraft roles.

== See also ==
- Robert McNamara as Secretary of Defense § Program consolidation - F-111
- George Spangenberg A head of fighter design at the US Navy for this program
