= Northrop YF-17 =

Prototype fighter aircraft for the US military

YF-17 "Cobra"
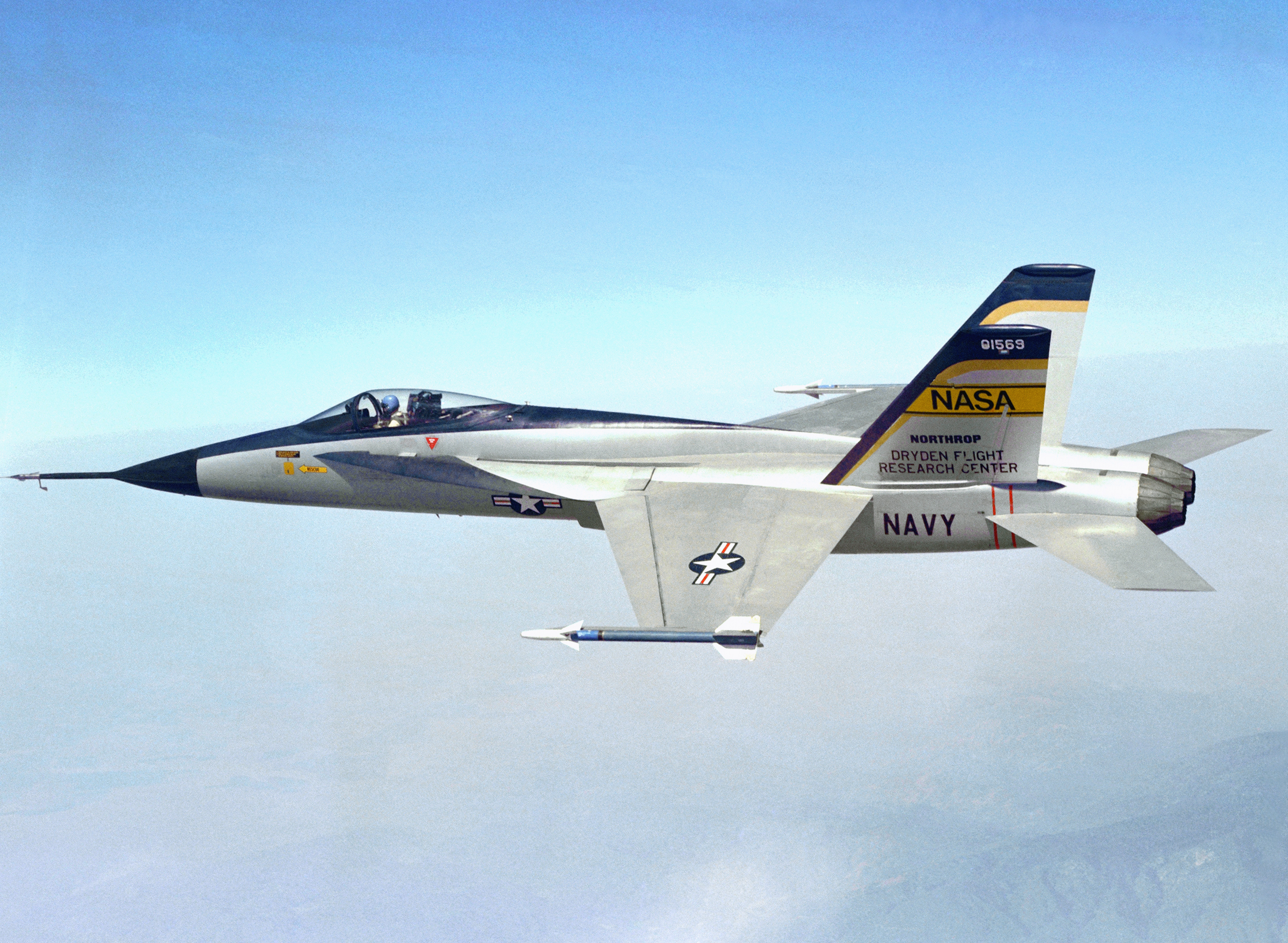
- YF-17 in 1976 during a demonstration flight

General information
- Type: Fighter jet prototype
- National origin: United States
- Manufacturer: Northrop
- Status: Canceled
- Primary user: United States Air Force (intended)
- Number built: 2

History
- First flight: 9 June 1974
- Developed from: Northrop F-5
- Developed into: Northrop F-18L; McDonnell Douglas F/A-18 Hornet

The Northrop YF-17 (nicknamed "Cobra") is a prototype lightweight fighter aircraft designed by Northrop aviation for the United States Air Force's Lightweight Fighter (LWF) technology evaluation program. The LWF was initiated because many in the fighter community believed that aircraft like the F-15 Eagle were too large and expensive for many combat roles. The YF-17 was the culmination of a long line of Northrop designs, beginning with the N-102 Fang in 1956, continuing through the F-5 family.

Although it lost the LWF competition to the YF-16, now F-16 Fighting Falcon, the YF-17 was selected for the new Naval Fighter Attack Experimental (VFAX) program. In enlarged form, the F/A-18 Hornet was adopted by the United States Navy and United States Marine Corps to replace the A-7 Corsair II and F-4 Phantom II, complementing the more expensive F-14 Tomcat. This design, conceived as a small and lightweight fighter, was scaled up to the Boeing F/A-18E/F Super Hornet, which is similar in size and weight to the F-15 and ultimately replaced the F-14. A non-naval, export variant developed and marketed by Northrop, the F-18L failed to attract buyers; nevertheless, many air forces have operated the McDonnell Douglas F/A-18 as a purely land-based fighter.

== Design and development ==
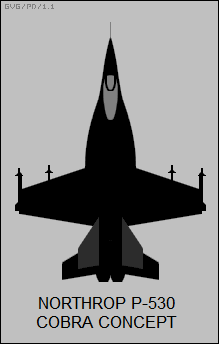
P-530 concept

=== Background ===
The aircraft's main design elements date to early 1965, from the internal Northrop project N-300. The N-300 was derived from the F-5E, and features a longer fuselage, small leading-edge root extensions (LERX), and more powerful GE15-J1A1 turbojets, rated at 9,000 lbf (40 kN). The wing position was raised slightly to increase ground clearance for ordnance. The N-300 further evolved into the P-530 Cobra, which uses 13,000 lbf (58 kN) GE15-J1A5 engines, with a very small 0.25:1 bypass ratio leading to the nickname "leaky turbojet". The bypass air was required for cooling the afterburner and nozzle and the cool bypass duct surface allowed the engine bay to be constructed of lighter, cheaper materials.

The P-530 wing planform and nose section were similar to the F-5, with a trapezoidal shape formed by a sweep of 20° at the quarter-chord line, and an unswept trailing edge, but was over double the area, with 400 sq ft (37 m^{2}) as opposed to 186 sq ft (17.3 m^{2}) of the F-5E. Initially shoulder mounted, the wings were lowered to the mid position. Its most distinctive new feature were the LERXs that tapered into the fuselage under the cockpit. They added about 50% additional lift at angles of attack exceeding 50°, improving maneuvering. The extensions also aligned airflow into the engines at high angles of attack. The resemblance to the head of a cobra led to the adoption of the nickname "Cobra" for the P-530.

=== Lightweight Fighter program ===
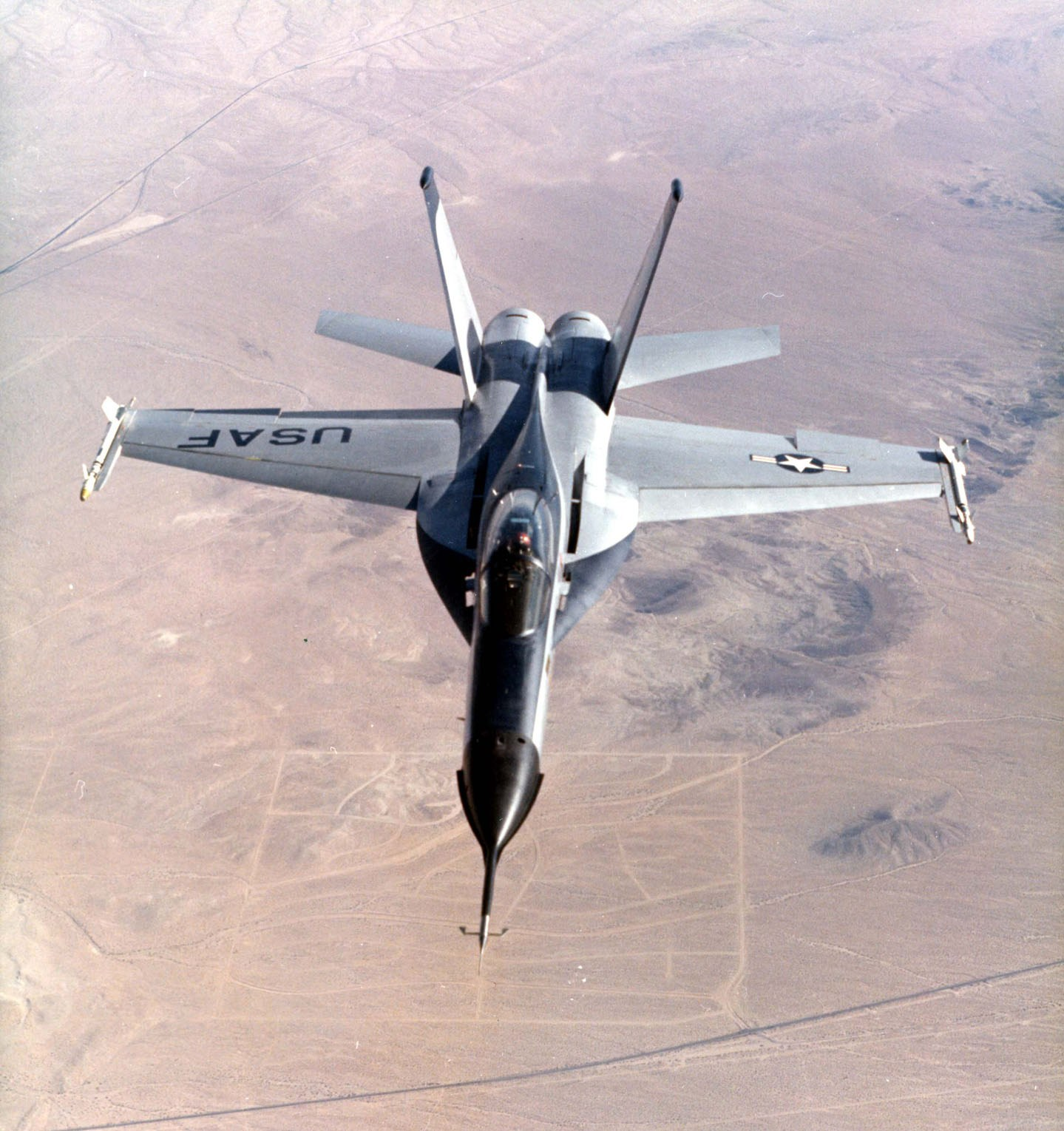
Frontal view of Northrop YF-17

When the Lightweight Fighter program was announced in 1971, Northrop modified the P-530 into the P-600 design that would be designated YF-17A. Whereas the P-530 was intended as a multi-role aircraft, the P-600 was to be strictly an air-to-air demonstrator, and consequently the cannon moved from the underside of the fuselage, to the upper part. Design of the YF-17 and the prototype YJ101 engine, a development of the GE15 engine, consumed over a million man-hours, and 5,000 hours of wind tunnel testing.

The YF-17 was primarily constructed of aluminum, in conventional semi-monocoque stressed-skin construction, though over 900 lb (408 kg) of its structure comprised graphite/epoxy composite. The small nose contained a simple ranging-radar. The cockpit had an ejection seat inclined at 18°, a bubble canopy, and a head-up display (HUD). The thin wings carried no fuel, and in areas such as the leading and trailing edge and the LERX, were composed of a Nomex honeycomb core with composite facesheets. The rear of the aircraft had twin all-moving stabilators of aluminum over a honeycomb core, and twin vertical stabilizers of a conventional construction. Like the wings, the leading and trailing edges were constructed of composite facesheets over honeycomb core. A composite speedbrake was located on top of the fuselage between the engines.

The aircraft was powered by two 14,400-pound-force (64 kN) General Electric YJ101-GE-100 afterburning turbojets, installed next to each other to minimize thrust asymmetry in the event of an engine failure. To minimise engine removal time they were removed from below the aircraft without disturbing the empennage controls. Each engine drove an hydraulic pump for independent aircraft systems. Unlike the P-530, the YF-17 had partial fly-by-wire, called an electronic control augmentation system (ECAS), which used ailerons, rudders, and stabilators for primary flight control.

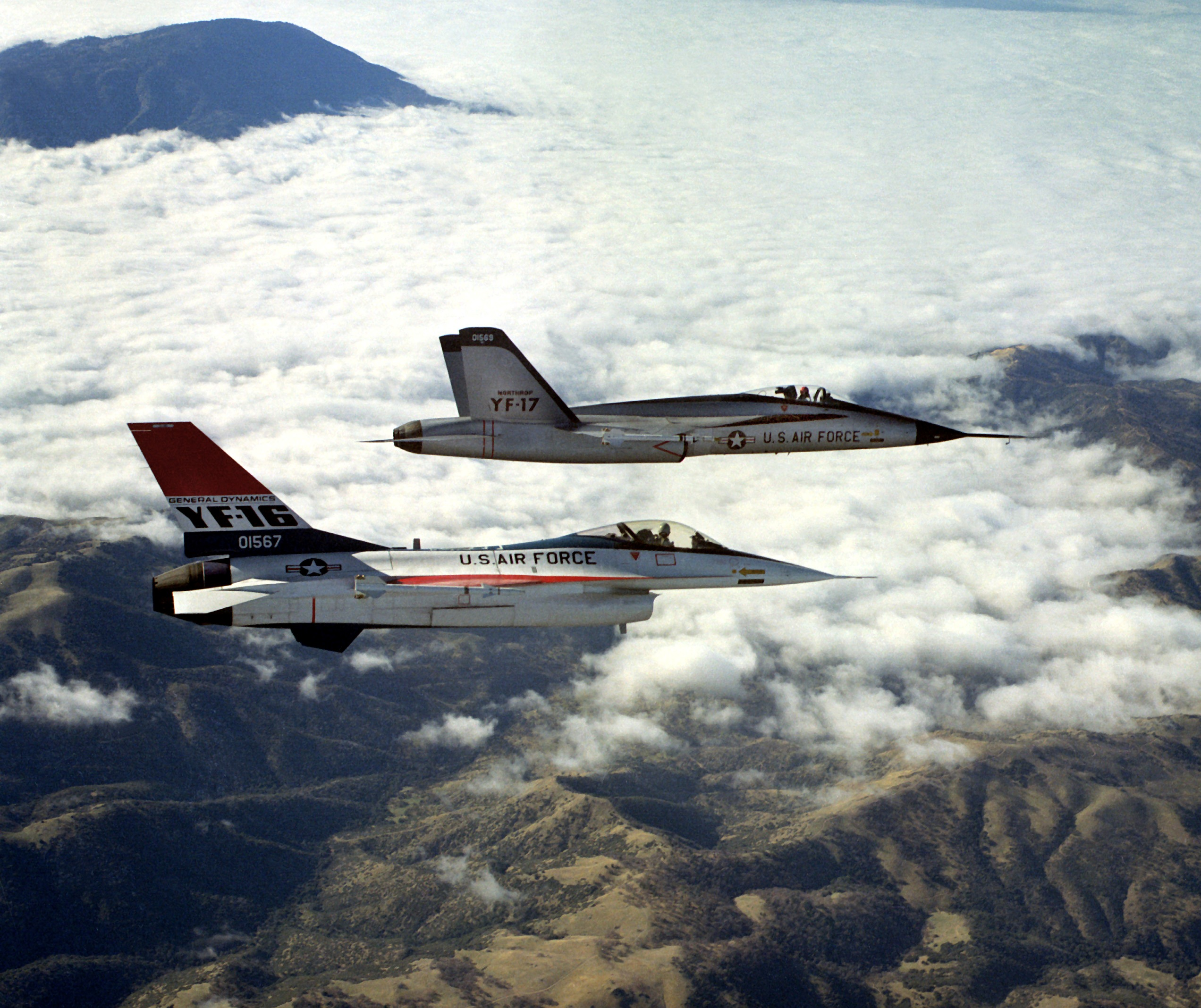
An air-to-air right side view of a YF-16 aircraft and a YF-17 aircraft, side-by-side, armed with AIM-9 Sidewinder missiles

Studies showed a single vertical stabilizer was insufficient at high angles of attack, and it was changed to twin vertical stabilizers, canted at 45°, resulting in a "relaxed longitudinal stability" design, which enhances maneuverability. Northrop was not yet confident in fly-by-wire controls and retained mechanically actuated flight controls. The resulting aircraft, unveiled on 28 January 1971, had a maximum weight of 40,000 lb (18,144 kg) and maximum speed of Mach 2, but stirred little interest among foreign buyers.

The first prototype (serial number 72-1569) was rolled out at Hawthorne on 4 April 1974; its first flight at Edwards AFB came on 9 June with Henry "Hank" Chouteau at the controls flying for 61 minutes reaching an altitude of 18,000 feet and a maximum speed of 610 miles per hour. Chouteau afterwards remarked that, "When our designers said that in the YF-17 they were going to give the airplane back to the pilot, they meant it. It's a fighter pilot's fighter." The second YF-17 (s/n 72-1570) first flew on 21 August. Through 1974, the YF-17 competed against the General Dynamics YF-16. The two YF-17 prototypes flew 288 test flights, totaling 345.5 hours. The YF-17 attained a top speed of Mach 1.95, a peak load factor of 9.4 g, and a maximum altitude of over 50,000 ft (15,000 m). It demonstrated a maximum angle of attack of 68 degrees at 28 kn IAS.

=== Naval Fighter Attack Experimental ===
Initially, the U.S. Navy was not heavily involved as a participant in the LWF program. In August 1974, Congress directed the Navy to make maximum use of the technology and hardware of the LWF for its new lightweight strike fighter, the VFAX. As neither contractor had experience with naval fighters, they sought partners to provide that expertise. General Dynamics teamed with Vought for the Vought Model 1600; Northrop with McDonnell Douglas for the F-18. Each submitted revised designs in line with the Navy needs for a long-range radar and multirole capabilities.

== Flight testing ==
Prototype YF-17 72-1569 was sent to NASA's Dryden Research Center for base drag studies from 27 May to 14 July 1976 prior to the first F/A-18 prototype under development.

== Aircraft on display ==
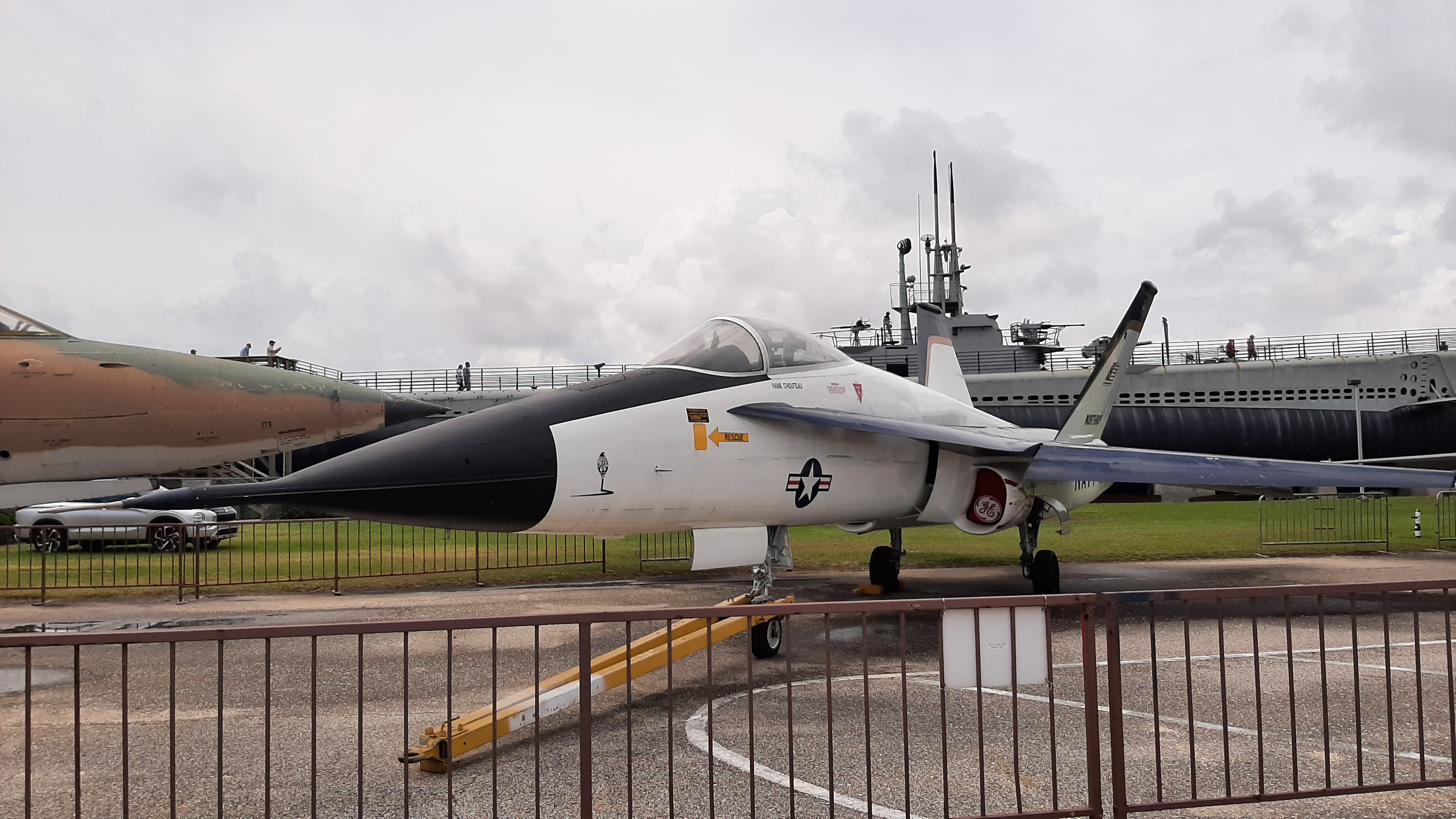
YF-17 72–1570 at Battleship Memorial Park in Mobile, Alabama

YF-17

- 72-1569 – Western Museum of Flight in Torrance, California
- 72-1570 – Battleship Memorial Park in Mobile, Alabama

== Specifications (YF-17A) ==
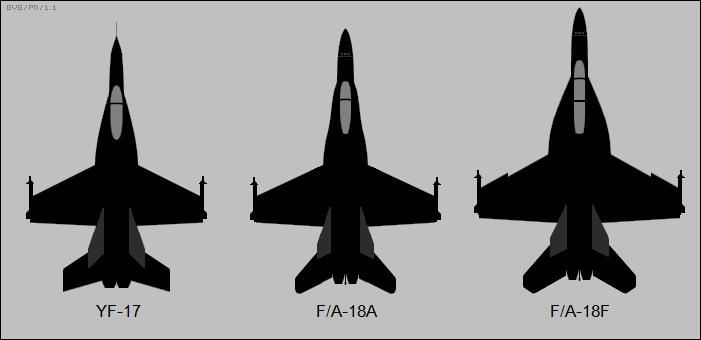
Size and physical comparison between YF-17, F/A-18A and F/A-18E/F

Data from Northrop YF-17: The fighter they didn't want Northrop YF-17 Pilot Flight Manual

General characteristics

- Crew: 1
- Length: 55 ft 6 in (16.92 m)
- Wingspan: 35 ft 0 in (10.67 m)
- Height: 14 ft 6 in (4.42 m)
- Wing area: 350 sq ft (33 m^{2})
- Empty weight: 17,390 lb (7,888 kg)
- Gross weight: 24,760 lb (11,231 kg)
- Max takeoff weight: 34,430 lb (15,617 kg)
- Fuel capacity: 6,400 lb (2902.99 kg)
- Powerplant: 2 × General Electric YJ101-GE-100 turbojet, 9,479 lbf (42.16 kN) thrust each dry, 15,000 lbf (67 kN) with afterburner

Performance

- Maximum speed: 1,320 mph (2,120 km/h, 1,150 kn) at 40,000 feet (12,000 m)
- Range: 2,800 mi (4,500 km, 2,400 nmi)
- Service ceiling: 60,000 ft (18,000 m)
- g limits: 9.4

Armament

- Guns: 1× 20 mm (0.79 in) M61 Vulcan Gatling gun, 500 rounds
- Hardpoints: 4 , with provisions to carry combinations of:
  - Bombs: 2x Mk-84 LDGP
  - Other: 2x ECM pods, 2x 600 gallon fuel tank
- Missiles: 2× AIM-9 Sidewinder

== See also ==
- List of military aircraft of the United States
- List of fighter aircraft

Related development

- Boeing F/A-18E/F Super Hornet
- McDonnell Douglas F/A-18 Hornet
- Northrop F-5

Aircraft of comparable role, configuration, and era

- General Dynamics F-16 Fighting Falcon
- Mikoyan MiG-29
