= General Electric YJ101 =

1970s American prototype turbojet aircraft engine

YJ101
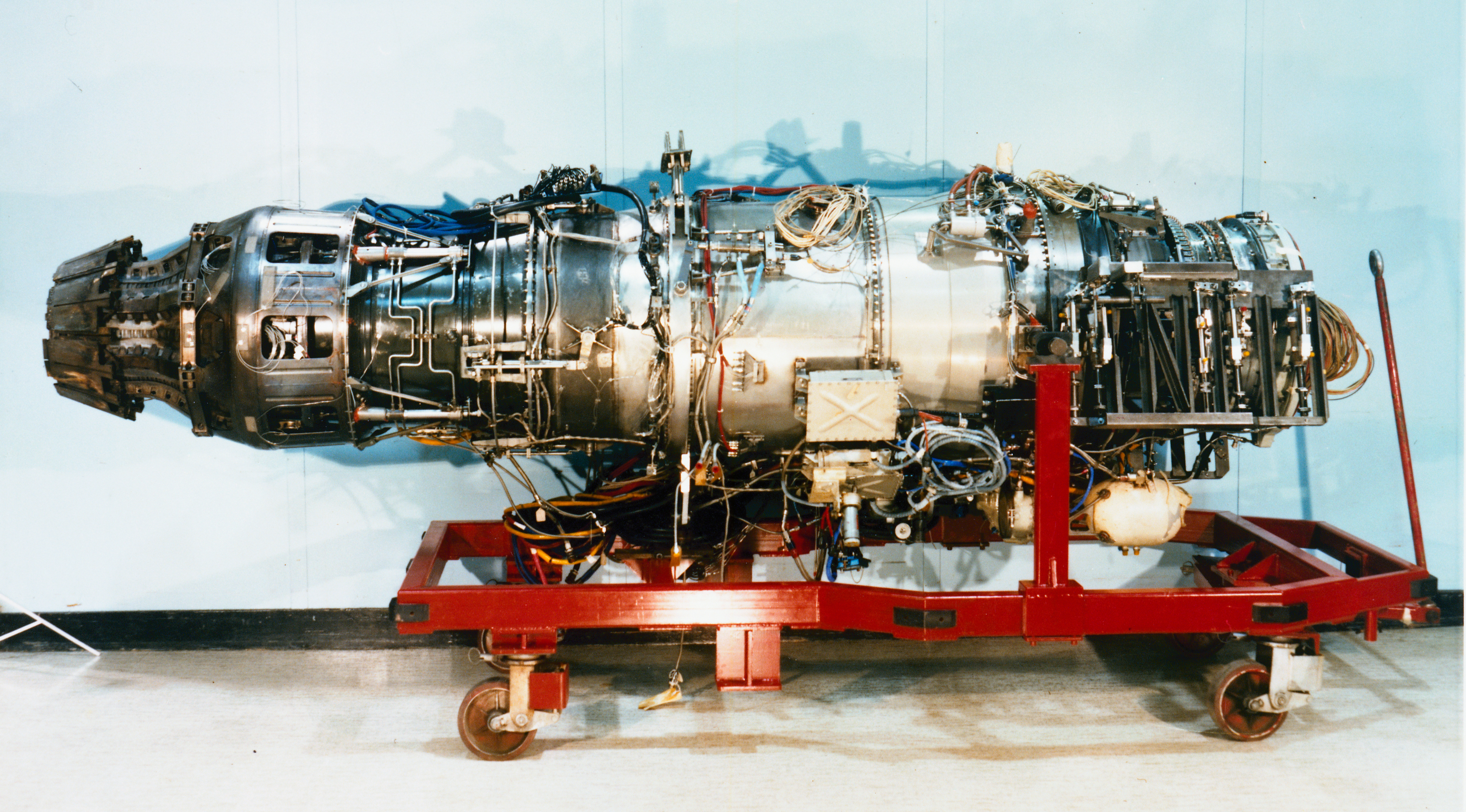
- YJ101
- Type: Turbojet
- National origin: United States
- Manufacturer: General Electric Aircraft Engines
- Major applications: Northrop YF-17
- Developed into: General Electric F404

The General Electric YJ101 was an afterburning turbojet engine, as signified by its "J" designation, in the 15,000 lbf class. It was designed for the Northrop P-530 Cobra, but its initial application was the Northrop YF-17 entry in the Lightweight Fighter (LWF) competition. It was subsequently developed into the widely used General Electric F404.

== Design ==
Two essential requirements for the engine were reliability, which can be measured by the number of times a particular engine model has to be shut down during flight (in-flight shutdown rate), and handling. This means stall-free operation throughout the entire flight envelope, allowing the pilot to make unrestricted throttle movements anywhere between idle and maximum afterburner.

The engine used continuous bypass bleed from the compressor to cool the afterburner liner and nozzle. The bypass air was not mixed with hot air from the turbine as the afterburner was a simple turbojet style with no requirement for intentional mixing of the bypass flow with the turbine exhaust. However, mixing is an important requirement for turbofan engines.

General Electric chose to describe the engine differently depending on the circumstances. To emphasize simplicity, it was a "leaky turbojet". For advanced technology, it was "the world's first self-cooled turbojet". This referred to using the compressor bypass air to cool the afterburner instead of using much hotter turbine exhaust gas.

== Applications ==
- Northrop YF-17

== Specifications (YJ101) ==
Data from Jane's All The World's Aircraft 1975-76, NASA Technical Report

==== General characteristics ====
- Type: Two-shaft afterburning turbojet with continuous bypass bleed
- Length: 145 inches (3,683 mm)
- Diameter: 32.5 inches (826 mm), 26.32 inches (669 mm) inlet
- Dry weight: 1,870 pounds (848 kg) (approx)

==== Components ====
- Compressor: Three-stage axial LP, seven-stage axial HP
- Combustors: Annular
- Turbine: Single-stage LP, single-stage HP

==== Performance ====
- Maximum thrust:
  - 15,000 pounds (6,804 kg) wet thrust class
  - 9,924 pounds (4,501 kg) military thrust
- Overall pressure ratio: 24, LPC: 3.9
- Bypass ratio: 0.25:1
- Air mass flow: 127 pounds per second (57.6 kg/s)
- Turbine inlet temperature: 2,445–2,465 °F (1,341–1,352 °C)
- Thrust-to-weight ratio: 7.9:1

== See also ==
Related development

- General Electric F404

Related lists

- List of aircraft engines
