= Volvo Aero =

Former Swedish aerospace manufacturer

- Industry: Aerospace
- Founded: 1930
- Defunct: 2012
- Fate: Acquired by GKN
- Successor: GKN Aerospace Engine Systems
- Headquarters: Trollhättan, Sweden
- Number of locations: Trollhättan, Linköping, Kongsberg (Norway), Newington, Connecticut (US)
- Parent: Volvo

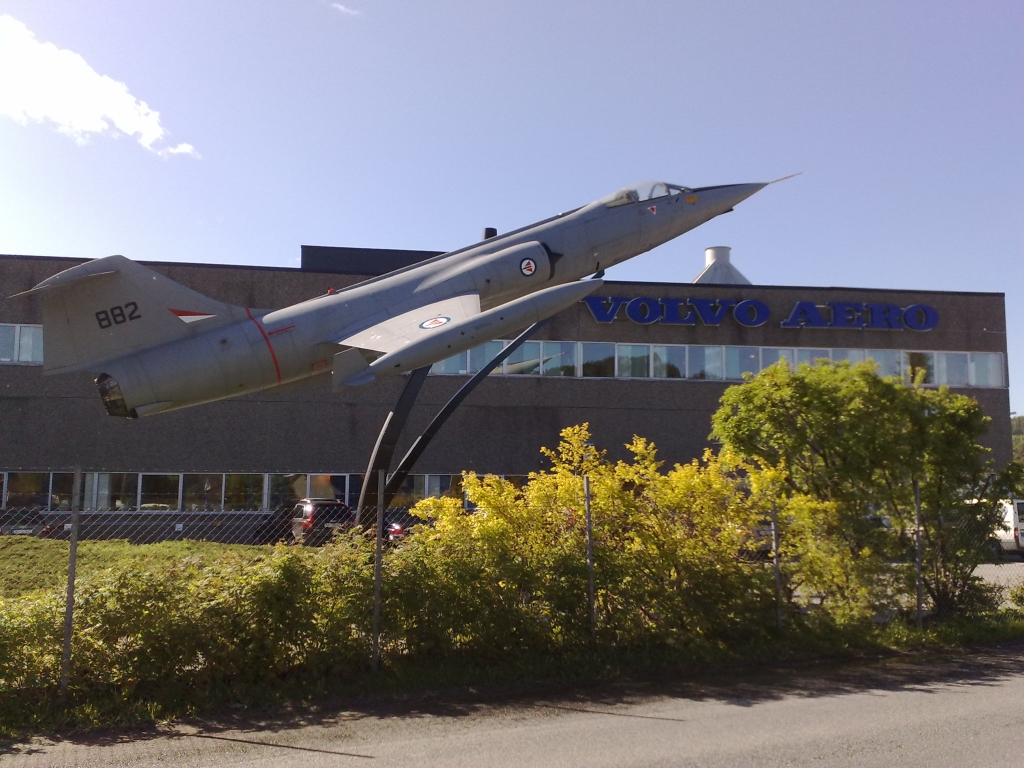
F-104 on display outside Volvo Aero

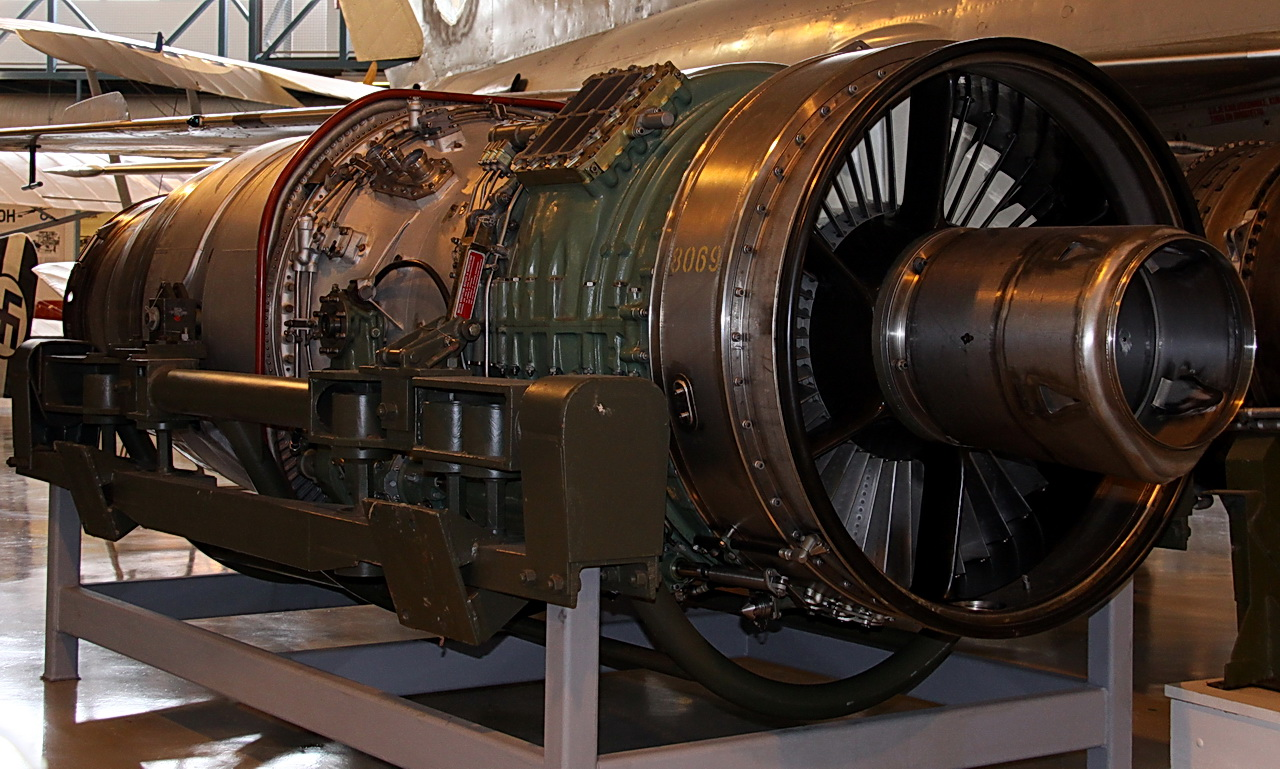
Volvo RM6B

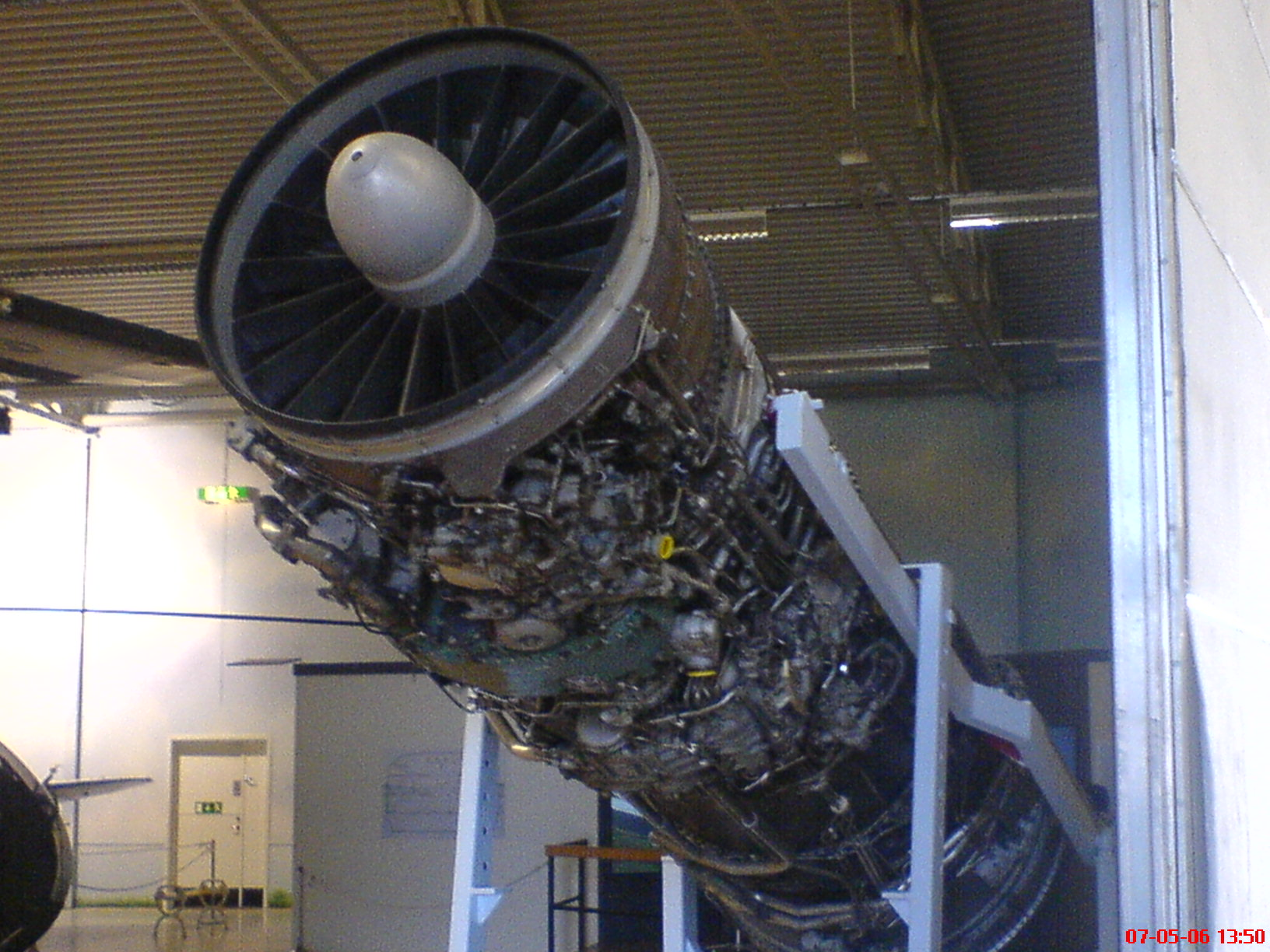
Volvo Flygmotor RM8B

Volvo Aero was a Swedish aircraft, guided missiles and rocket engine manufacturer. It became GKN Aerospace Engine Systems following the company's acquisition by British engineering conglomerate GKN during 2012.

It was originally established as Nohab Flygmotorfabriker AB in 1930 to produce aero engines. The firm became a part of SAAB during 1937; Volvo later purchased most of the stock, thus it was renamed Svenska Flygmotor AB (SFA) and later Volvo Flygmotor. It became the major engine supplier of the Swedish Air Force during the post-war period. During the 1970s, Volvo Flygmotor branched into the commercial aerospace sector, offering overhauls and subcomponent production for several international engine manufacturers, as well as into the European space sector.

During the 2000s, Volvo Aero focused on cooperative ventures with various partner companies around the globe. As a result of the Great Recession, Volvo Aero experienced a sustained downturn in business, resulting in layoffs and contributing to the firm's sale. Parent company Volvo decided to sell their aerospace division amid the economic downturn; GKN emerged amongst several bidders as the frontrunner, finalising its purchase of Volvo Aero during 2012.

== History ==
Nohab Flygmotorfabriker AB was founded in Trollhättan, Sweden, in 1930 to produce aircraft engines for the Swedish Board of Aviation. As reflected in the name of the company, it was a subsidiary of the Swedish manufacturing and railway locomotive specialist NOHAB. In 1937, the firm became a part of the newly founded SAAB; however, during 1941, Volvo acquired a majority of the stock. Accordingly, the company's name was changed to Svenska Flygmotor AB (SFA), and later on Volvo Flygmotor.

During the 1950s, the company leveraged partnerships with foreign engine manufacturers, helping it to acquire expertise in the recently developed turbojet engine. It undertook the licensed manufacture of several engines, such as the Rolls-Royce Avon (referred to in Swedish Air Force service as the RM5 and RM6) and the Pratt & Whitney JT8D (RM8). Throughout the post-war period, the company has served as the major engine supplier of the Swedish Air Force.

During the 1970s, the firm decided to apply the experience it had gathered on the production and service of military aircraft engines towards the commercial aerospace sector. The first overhaul services it offered were for the JT8 engine. Volvo Flygmotor soon expanded its activities into the manufacture of subcomponents for several international engine manufacturers, including General Electric, Pratt & Whitney, and Rolls-Royce Plc.

Seeking to further growth of its commercial operations, Volvo Flygmotor became involved in the European Space Program, producing a number of components for the rocket engines that power the Ariane of heavy launch vehicles. The firm successfully expanded significantly beyond its domestic market. Recognised that that its name needed to be easily recognised internationally, the company changed its name to the Volvo Aero Corporation during the early 1990s.

By the late 1990s, Volvo Aero's component range included fan cases, fan-compressor structures, compressor rotors, shafts, combustor structures, vanes, low-pressure turbine (LPT) cases, turbine structures, rocket nozzles, combustion chambers, and rocket engine turbines for both civilian and military purposes. By 2003, the firm's workforce comprised 3,600 employees, it also recorded total sales of 0.9 billion euros during that year. Presently, Volvo Aero is a partner in more than ten commercial engine programmes and components produced by the company are installed in more than 90% of all large commercial aircraft engines sold.

During the 2000s, further efforts were made by Volvo Aero towards close cooperation with various industrial partners. During July 2008, Volvo Aero and Rolls-Royce signed a risk-and-revenue-sharing agreement for the Rolls-Royce Trent XWB turbofan engine, under which Volvo Aero developed and manufactured the intermediate compressor case, a key engine component; the firm estimated this contract's value to be SEK40 billion over 40 years. In November 2008, Pratt & Whitney and Volvo Aero Norge agreed for the latter to produce diffuser case components for the Pratt & Whitney F135 engine; that same year, Volvo Aero secured work on the Pratt & Whitney PW1000G engine as well. In June 2009, SNECMA and Volvo Aero agreed on the principles of a five-year partnership between the two companies in the space propulsion sector.

Following the start of the Great Recession in 2008, Volvo Aero shared in the general downturn in business activity. In January 2009, Volvo Aero announced the redundancy of 250 blue collar and 100 white collar employees; a further cut of 200 positions was announced as a result of the economic downturn in June 2009. A year-on-year downwards trend in its sales activity was observed in the years surrounding this time, stimulating parent company Volvo to examine the company's future prospects. In September 2010, Volvo announced the sale of its US subsidiary, Volvo Aero Services, to a private equity firm.

By 2011, Volvo was seeking to dispose of its aero engine division to focus on its production of trucks and construction equipment. In March 2011, British engineering group GKN was reportedly being regarded as the frontrunner to acquire the company as several other bidders, including German engine specialist MTU Aero Engines, as well as private equity firms The Carlyle Group and Nordic Capital, decided to withdraw from their own acquisition ambitions. On 6 July 2012, Volvo Aero was acquired by the GKN in a SEK 6.9 billion deal. The sale was viewed as one step in a wider trend in the aerospace industry towards consolidation.

Following the Volvo Aero acquisition, GKN entered into a 15 month period of restructuring. During 2012, Volvo Aero declared that it intended to expand its engine component production range over the coming years.

== Test facility ==
In the 1950s, the Swedish Air Board constructed an unusual test facility at Flygmotor. This was an engine test facility, a form of wind tunnel, which could operate at high inlet pressures, thus high Reynolds numbers. This tunnel was unique in being water-powered. A sealed underground chamber was blasted out of the granite beneath the Göta Canal. When the canal was allowed to flood the chamber, air was driven from it at high pressure and through the test chamber. A supersonic test of an engine could be carried out for around 10 minutes, after which it took 24 hours to pump the chamber dry again. Use of this test facility was shared with Rolls-Royce, who used it in 1953 to develop the afterburners of the Avon RA7 engine for the Supermarine Swift F3 and Saab 32 Lansen. The Avon RA14 afterburner would also be tested here, produced as the Flygmotor RM6B for the Saab 35 Draken.

== Products ==
=== Aircraft engines and components ===
Volvo Aero is a supplier of single-engine systems for military aircraft. These have largely been in partnership with other engine manufacturers, such as the RM1 (de Havilland Goblin) for the Saab 21R, RM2 (de Havilland Ghost) for the Saab J29, RM5 and RM6 (Rolls-Royce Avon) for the Saab 32 Lansen, the RM6B for the Saab 35 Draken, and the RM8 (Pratt & Whitney JT8D) for the Saab 37 Viggen. The Saab JAS 39 Gripen's RM12 engine is a derivative of the General Electric F404.

Svenska Flygmotor also designed the B42, a horizontally opposed four-cylinder engine, intended for the SAAB Safir. However, SAAB decided to use engines from de Havilland and Lycoming instead. In the end the B42 came to power the Infanterikanonvagn 103 assault gun. A follow-up called the B44 powered the Pansarbandvagn 301 armoured personnel carrier.

Volvo Aero delivers engine components, mainly complex engine structures like turbine exhaust casings, turbine mid frames, LPT cases, compressor housings, LPT shafts, vanes, and large rotating parts.

=== Engine maintenance and service ===
Volvo Aero also has a facility in Trollhättan where they did maintenance on aircraft engines and stationary gas turbines. The aircraft engines are Pratt & Whitney Canada PW100 and TFE-731 engines. The Stationary gas turbines is General Electric LM1600 engine, and the DR990, which Volvo bought the OEM responsibility from Dresser Rand.

Formed in 1979, US aftermarket aircraft parts seller AGES Group was sold to Volvo Aero in 1999 to form Volvo Aero Services. In 2011, VAS Aero Services was sold to HIG Capital and returned to being privately held in 2017. It employs over 200 worldwide.

=== Space propulsion ===
Volvo Aero manufactures combustion chambers, nozzles and turbines for commercial launch vehicles.

=== Hydraulic motors ===
The company have produced the F-series hydraulic motors under the Volvo Flygmotor, "Volvo Hydraulics" and VOAC brands. The main feature of these products are the spherical pistons each with a laminated segment. This technology permits a large angle (40°) between the shaft and the cylinder barrel.

== Locations ==
Volvo Aero subsidiaries are located in the United States and Norway, in addition to Volvo's home country, Sweden. The Norwegian plant, in Kongsberg, is the former Norsk Jetmotor, itself formerly a part of Kongsberg Våpenfabrikk.
