= Saab RB05 =

Saab 305 / RB05
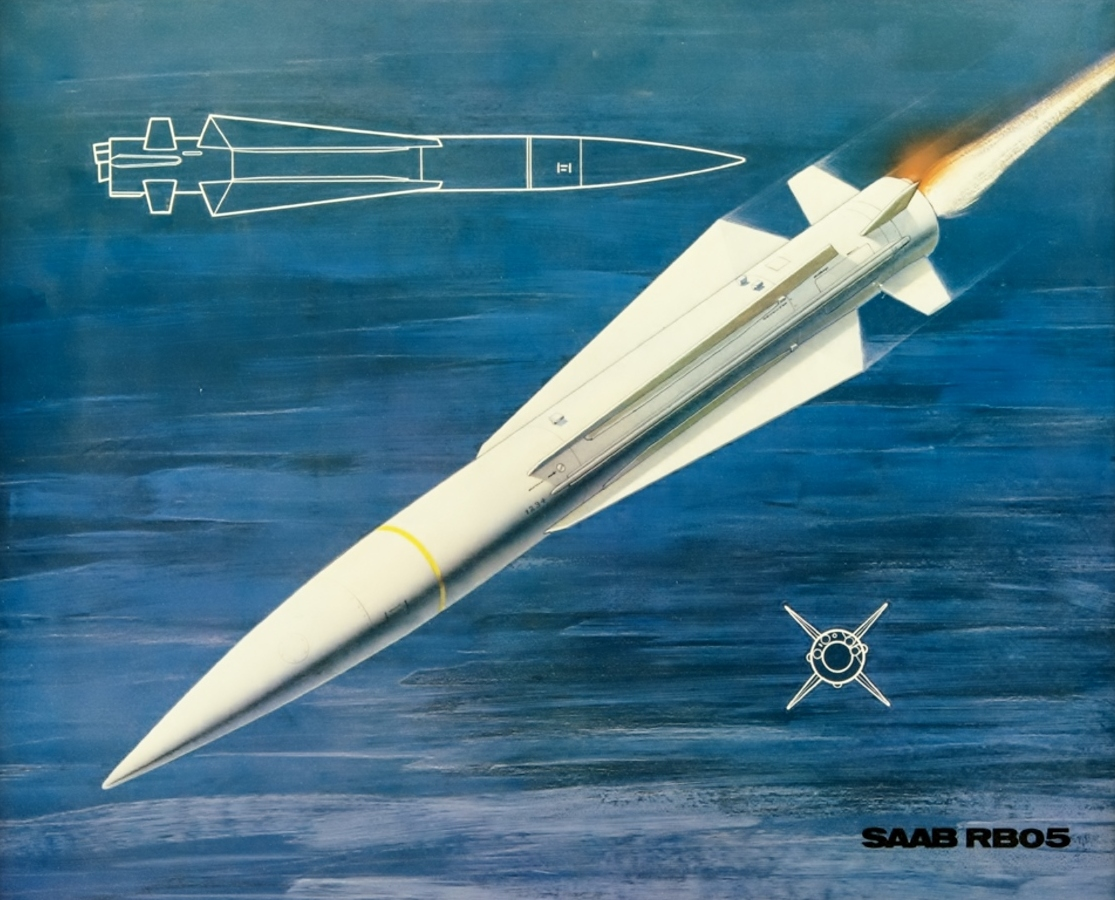
- Board with color print of the SAAB RB05
- Type: Air-to-surface missile, limited air-to-air missile
- Place of origin: Sweden

Service history
- In service: 1972 – 2005
- Used by: Sweden

Production history
- Manufacturer: Missile – Saab-Scania, Missiles and Electronics; Engine – Volvo Flygmotor

Specifications
- Mass: 305 kg (672 lb)
- Length: 3.6 m (11.8 ft)
- Diameter: 0.3 m (11.8 in)
- Wingspan: 0.8 m (31.5 in)
- Warhead: 160 kg high explosive
- Detonation mechanism: Proximity fuze
- Engine: VR 35 (Note: VR 35 = Volvo Rocket 35?) liquid propellant rocket engine
- Operational range: 9 km (5.6 mi; 4.9 nmi)
- Maximum speed: supersonic
- Guidance system: radio controlled manual command to line of sight
- Launch platform: Saab 37 Viggen; Saab 105

The Saab RB05 (abbreviation of Swedish: robot 05, "missile 05"), initially named Saab 305 (RB 305) (Note: 305 = missile project, no. 5; series 300 is dropped when the missile enter service) or AT 3 internally, was a short-range air-to-surface missile with limited air-to-air capability that was developed in the 1960s by the Swedish company Saab-Scania, Missiles and Electronics for the Swedish Air Force.

== History ==
The RB 05 was developed as a ground attack missile for the Saab 37 Viggen fighter-bomber and Saab 105 trainer aircraft in 1967. The missile was tracer guided using radio controlled manual command to line of sight (MCLOS), which meant that aiming had to be done separate to piloting, either requiring a two-seat cockpit with a dedicated missile gunner, as per the Saab 105, or a central computer which could control the aircraft during guidance, as present on the Saab 37 Viggen.

During development, Saab used a variety of Saab 35 Draken prototypes for testing. Saab 35 prototypes with tandem trainer cockpits were used for many of the firing trials, as the guidance equipment could be easily retrofitted into the secondary cockpit to trial guidance with a dedicated missile gunner.

The RB 05 was issued for operative use in 1972.

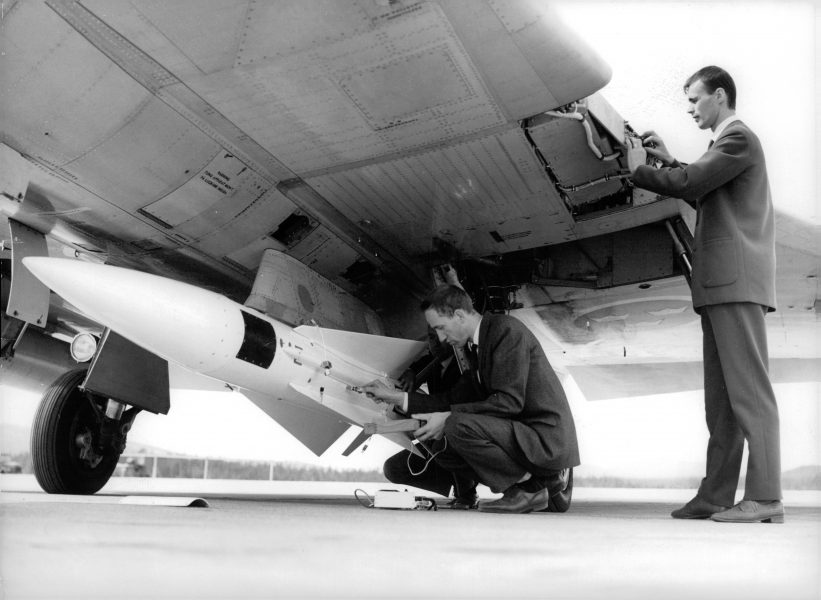
Saab 35-10 (prototype 10) with RB 305 during trials.

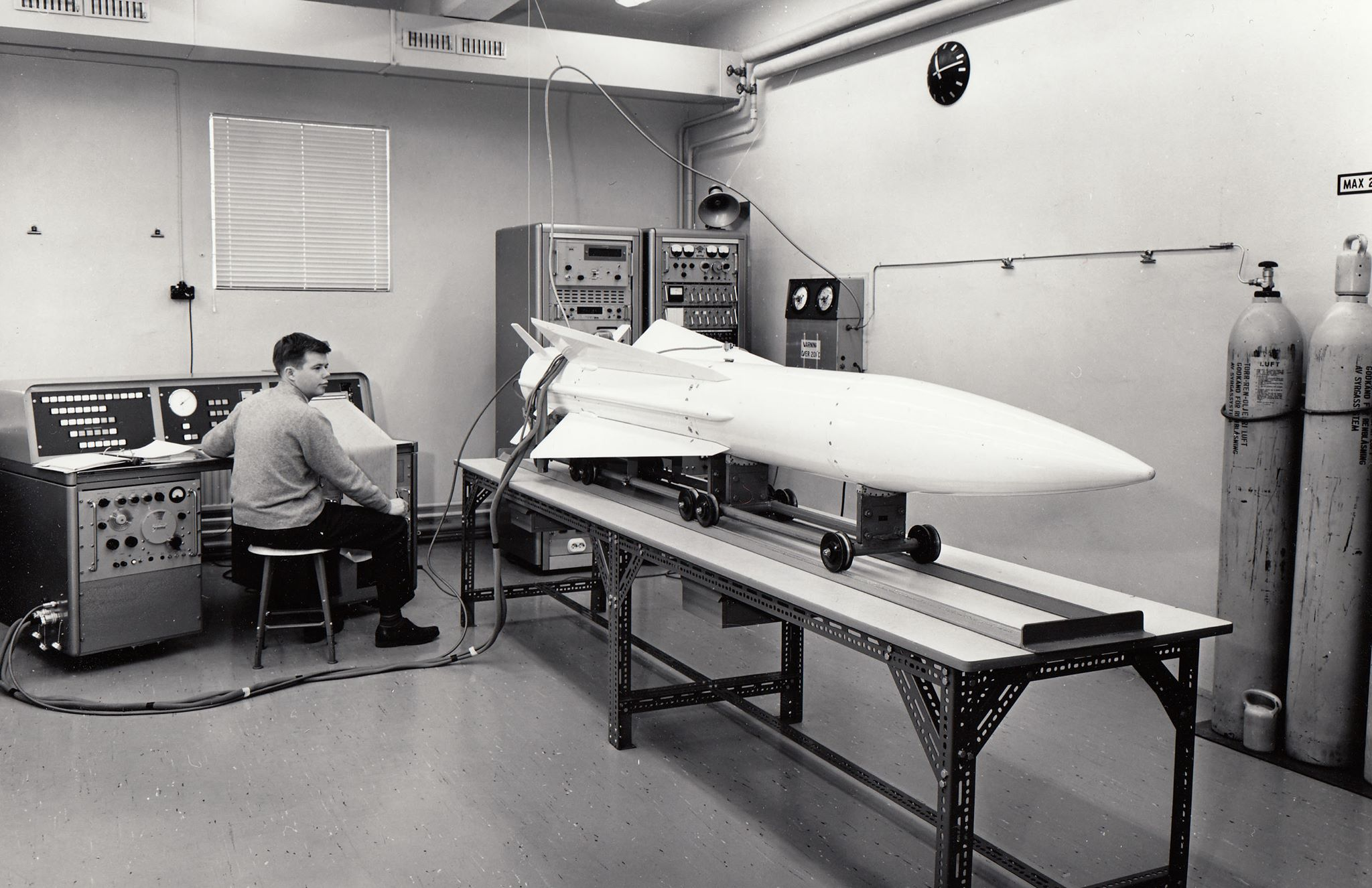
Programming of RB 05 at Saab.

== Use ==
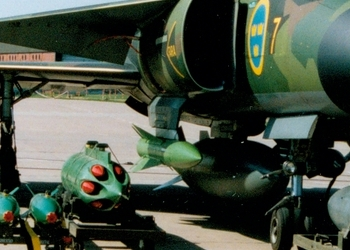
Inert robot 05 fitted on the intake pylon of a Saab AJ 37 Viggen fighter-bomber

The missile would usually be launched after a high-speed attack run at very low altitude and climb to 400 m for launch. The supersonic speed was deemed necessary to reduce the threat of surface-to-air missiles. Since RB 05 was roll-stabilized, the aircraft did not need to be aimed straight at the target when launching, and would immediately descend again.

Tracking the flares on the missile, the pilot would then guide the missile optically (the missile's engine was smokeless as to not obscure the view) with a joystick towards the target. Guidance commands were transmitted to the missile via a jam-proof radio transmission link.

== Engine ==
Manual command guidance required a propulsion system with smokeless exhaust, so the pre-packaged liquid rocket engine was chosen. Liquid rocket propulsion unit VR35 was developed by Volvo Flygmotor. It used high-density storable hypergolic propellants: inhibited red fuming nitric acid (IRFNA) as an oxidizer and hydyne (mixture of 60% UDMH and 40% DETA) as a fuel. Propellants were stored in concentric tanks: IRFNA in outer bladder tank and hydyne in inner tank, fitted with a piston for fuel expulsion. Propellants were fed into the engine by pressure from solid-propellant gas generator that used a double base propellant pellet. Near burn-out, shut-off valve seals tanks to prevent any residual propellants from producing smoke or fumes. Pressure-fed engine had a combustion chamber made from aluminium alloy with inner layer of silica-phenolic ablative material. Whole propulsion system has a diameter of 0.3 m (same as missile body), length of 1.77 m, total mass of 127 kg with propellant mass fraction of 0.59.

== Variants ==
- Saab 305A – RB 05 A : initial variant with radio guidance, aimed optically using a tracer.
- Saab 305B – RB 05 B : prototyped TV-guided variant. Tested in the early 1970s but the design was scrapped in favour of adopting the AGM-65 Maverick (RB 75) for economic reasons.
- Saab 305C – RB 05 C : proposed command/IR guided version. During use the pilot would aim the aircraft on to the target. In the aircraft there would be an IR sensor that measured in the missile and gave data to the aircraft computer, which calculated control signals for the missile. Not much is known. Cancelled.

There also existed inert variants for mounting and flight training, painted in green with the text "blind" on the side. Live munition was painted with a yellow stripe over the warhead.

== Operators ==
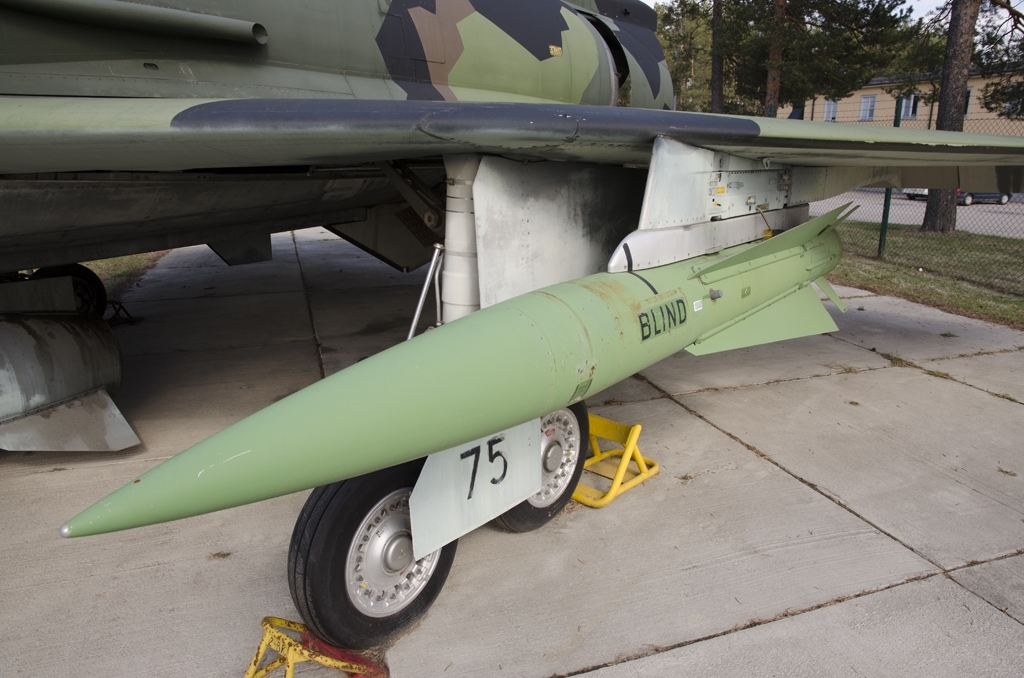
Inert training version of robot 05 under the wing of a Saab AJ 37 Viggen fighter-bomber. In service the RB05 was traditionally not mounted on the outer pylons for aiming reasons

Sweden

- Swedish Air Force : operated the RB 05 on the AJ, AJS and AJSF 37 Viggen multirole combat aircraft and the SK 60B and C light attackers.

== Similar missiles ==
- (United States) AGM-12 Bullpup - had a similar liquid propulsion system
- (Soviet Union) Kh-23 Grom
- (France) Nord AS.20 / Nord AA.20
- (France) Nord AS.30
