= Saab 37 Viggen =

1967 Swedish fighter aircraft family

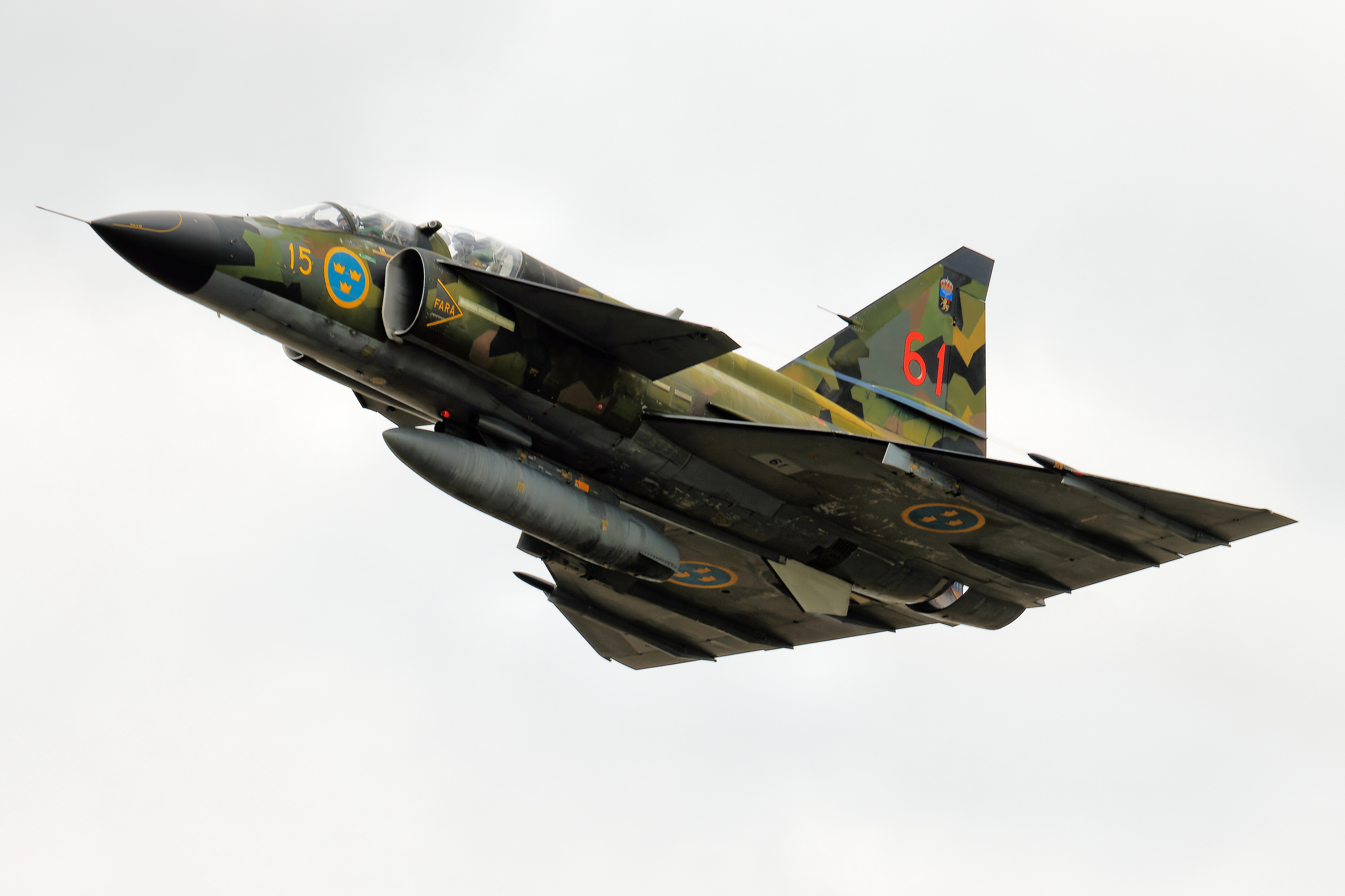
- A SK 37E Viggen in flight

General information
- Type: Multirole combat aircraft: AJ 37: Fighter bomber; SF 37: Photo reconnaissance; SH 37: Maritime patrol; JA 37: Strike fighter; SK 37: Trainer aircraft
- National origin: Sweden
- Manufacturer: Saab AB
- Primary user: Swedish Air Force
- Number built: 329

History
- Manufactured: 1970–1990
- Introduction date: 21 June 1971 (AJ 37)
- First flight: 8 February 1967
- Retired: 26 June 2007 (SK 37E)

Saab 37 Viggen (The Tufted Duck; the word also means The Thunderbolt) (Note: The names of Swedish combat aircraft are always in the definite form, like Lansen or Gripen while non-combat aircraft like Saab Safir are in indefinite form.) is a single-seat, single-engine multirole combat aircraft designed and produced by the Swedish aircraft manufacturer Saab. It was the first canard-equipped aircraft to be produced in quantity and the first to carry an airborne digital central computer with integrated circuits for its avionics, arguably making it the most modern/advanced combat aircraft in Europe at the time of introduction. The digital central computer was the first of its kind in the world, automating and taking over tasks previously requiring a navigator/copilot, facilitating handling in tactical situations where, among other things, high speeds and short decision times determined whether attacks would be successful or not, a system not surpassed until the introduction of the Panavia Tornado into operational service in 1981.

Development work began during the early 1950s to develop a successor to the Saab 32 Lansen in the attack role, as well as to the Saab 35 Draken as a fighter. Saab's design team opted for a relatively radical delta wing configuration, and operation as an integrated weapon system in conjunction with Sweden's STRIL-60 national electronic air defense system. It was also designed to be operated from runways as short as 500 meters. Development work was aided by the "37-annex" under which Sweden could access advanced U.S. aeronautical technology to accelerate both design and production. The aircraft's aerodynamic design was finalised in 1963. The prototype performed its maiden flight on 8 February 1967 and the following year the Swedish government ordered an initial batch of 175 Viggens. The first of these entered service with the Swedish Air Force on 21 June 1971.

Even as the initial AJ 37 model entered service, Saab was working on further variants of the Viggen. Several distinct variants of the Viggen would be produced to perform the roles of fighter bomber/strike fighter (AJ 37), aerial reconnaissance (SF 37), maritime patrol/anti-surface (SH 37) and a two-seat trainer (Sk 37). During the late 1970s, the all-weather interceptor/strike fighter JA 37 variant was introduced. Attempts to export the Viggen to other nations were made, but ultimately proved unsuccessful. In November 2005, the last Viggens were withdrawn from service by the Swedish Air Force, its only operator; by this point, it had been replaced by the newer and more advanced Saab JAS 39 Gripen.

== Name ==
Viggen is the definite form of the Swedish word vigg, which has two meanings. According to Saab, the aircraft's name alluded to both.

The first meaning refers to the Swedish name for the tufted duck, a small diving duck common in Sweden. In this sense, it serves as a reference to the aircraft's canard configuration, as "canard" is French for duck.

Vigg is also åskvigg, or "thunderbolt" (thunder wedge), stemming from the thunderstones of Nordic folklore, called "åskviggar", said to come from the lightning strikes of Norse god Thor when he hunted giants with his war hammer, Mjölnir.

== Development ==
=== Origins ===
The Viggen was initially developed as an intended replacement for the Saab 32 Lansen in the attack role and later the Saab 35 Draken as a fighter. In 1955, as Saab's prototype Draken, the most aerodynamically advanced fighter in the world at that point, performed its first flight, the Swedish Air Force was already forming a series of requirements for the next generation of combat aircraft; due to the challenging nature of these requirements, a lengthy development time was anticipated, with the first flight intended to be no earlier than the middle of the next decade. Between 1952 and 1957, the first studies towards what would become the Viggen were carried out, involving the Finnish aircraft designer Aarne Lakomaa. Over 100 different concepts were examined in these studies, involving both single- and twin engine configurations, both traditional and double delta wings, and canard wings. Even VTOL designs were considered, with separate lift engines, but were soon identified as being unacceptable.

From the onset, the Viggen was planned as an integrated weapon system, to be operated in conjunction with the newest revision of Sweden's national electronic air defense system, STRIL-60. It was used as the nation's standard platform, capable of being efficiently adapted to perform all tactical mission roles. Other requirements included supersonic ability at low level, Mach 2 performance at altitude, and the ability to make short landings at low angles of attack (to avoid damaging improvised runways). The aircraft was also designed from the beginning to be easy to repair and service, even for personnel without much training.

One radical requirement of the proposed aircraft was the ability for it to be operated from relatively short runways only 500 meters long; this was part of the Bas 60 air base system that had been introduced by the Swedish Air Force in the late 1950s. Bas 60 revolved around force dispersal of aircraft across many wartime air bases, including road runways acting as backup runways. Utilizing partially destroyed runways was another factor that motivated STOL capability. Bas 60 was developed into Bas 90 in the 1970s and 1980s, and included short runways only 800 meters in length. Enabling such operations imposed several critical demands upon the design, including a modest landing speed, no-flare touchdown, powerful post-landing deceleration, accurate steering even in crosswinds on icy surfaces, and high acceleration on take-off.

In 1960, the U.S. National Security Council, led by President Eisenhower, formulated a security guarantee for Sweden, promising U.S. military help in the event of a Soviet attack against Sweden; both countries signed a military-technology agreement. In what was known as the "37-annex", Sweden was allowed access to advanced U.S. aeronautical technology that made it possible to design and produce the Viggen much faster and more cheaply than would otherwise have been possible. According to research by Nils Bruzelius at the Swedish National Defence College, the reason for this officially unexplained U.S. support was to protect U.S. Polaris submarines deployed just outside the Swedish east coast against the threat of Soviet anti-submarine aircraft. However, Bruzelius' theory has been discredited by Simon Moores and Jerker Widén. The connection also appears doubtful due to the time scale – the Viggen's strike version only became operational in 1971, and the fighter version in 1978, by which time Polaris had already been retired.

=== Project launch ===
In December 1961, the Swedish government gave its approval for the development of Aircraft System 37, which would ultimately become the Viggen. By 1962, all elements for the project either existed or were close to fully developed; these included the aircraft itself, the powerplant, ejector seat, armaments, reconnaissance systems, ground servicing equipment, and training equipment such as simulators. In February 1962, approval of the overall configuration was given and was followed by a development contract in October 1962. According to aviation authors Bill Gunston and Peter Gilchrist, the project was "by far the largest industrial development task ever attempted in Sweden". During the 1960s, the Viggen accounted for 10 percent of all Swedish R&D funding.

In 1963, Saab finalized the aerodynamic design of the aircraft; the aerodynamic configuration was radical: it combined an aft-mounted double delta wing with a small, high-set canard foreplane, equipped with powered trailing flaps mounted ahead of and slightly above the main wing; this would be judged to be the best means to satisfy the conflicting demands for STOL performance, supersonic speed, low turbulence sensitivity at low level flight, and efficient lift for subsonic flight. Canard aircraft have since become common in fighter aircraft, notably with the Eurofighter Typhoon, Dassault Rafale, Saab JAS 39 Gripen and the IAI Kfir, but principally for the purposes of providing agility during flight rather than for its STOL capabilities. Further aerodynamic refinements during the later stage of development included the addition of dog-tooth patterns upon the main wing to generate vortices, allowing for the elimination of blown flaps from the canard. The use of a thrust reverser enabled the sought short landing performance.

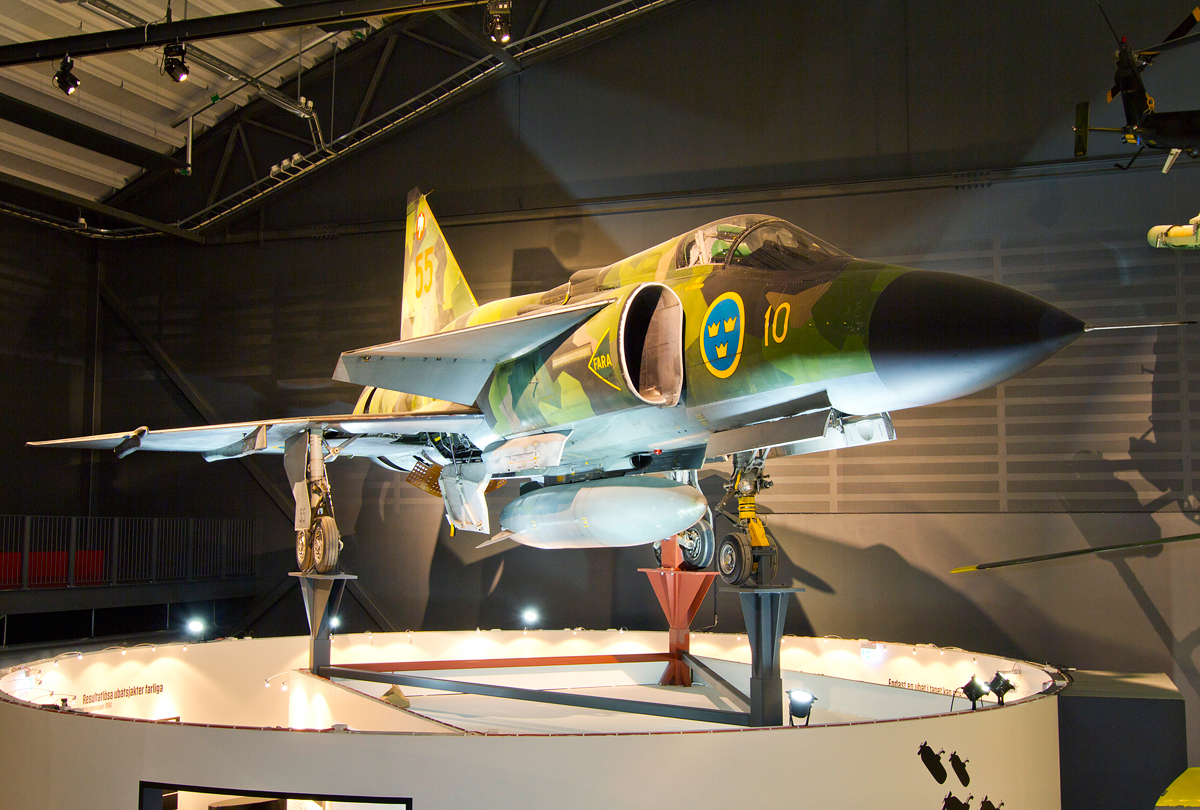
AJS 37 Viggen on display at the Swedish Air Force Museum, Linköping

During development, Saab had opted to power the type using a single large turbofan engine. Originally, the British Rolls-Royce Medway engine had been selected to power the Viggen, which was then considered to be ideal for the basis for a supersonic engine equipped with a fully modulated afterburner; however, development of the Medway engine was cancelled due to the intended launch aircraft, the de Havilland Trident, being downsized during development. In place of the Medway, Saab chose to adopt a licence-production version of the American Pratt & Whitney JT8D engine, the Volvo RM8, instead. The RM8 was heavily redesigned, using new materials to accommodate flight at Mach-2 speeds, a Swedish-built afterburner, and a fully variable nozzle.

During 1964, construction of the first prototype aircraft commenced; on 8 February 1967, the first of an eventual seven prototypes conducted its maiden flight, which had occurred as per the established development schedule. This first flight, which lasted for 43 minutes, was flown by Erik Dahlström, Saab's chief test pilot, who reported the prototype to have been easy to handle throughout. Writing at the time, aerospace publication Flight International described the flight as having been "Sweden's astonishing unilateral stand in the front rank of advanced aircraft-building nations…"

Each of the seven prototypes were assigned different roles, although the initial aircraft were focused on supporting the development of the initial production variant, the AJ37. In 1967, the Swedish Government concluded that the in-development AJ 37 Viggen would be both cheaper than and superior to the McDonnell Douglas F-4 Phantom II. In April 1968, the Swedish government formally issued the authorization for manufacturing of the Viggen to proceed, issuing an order for 175 Viggens that year. Also in 1968, Saab began work on the Viggen's maritime reconnaissance and photo reconnaissance variants. In May 1969, the Viggen made its first public appearance outside of Sweden at the Paris Air Show. On 23 February 1971, the first production aircraft, an AJ37 model, conducted its first flight. In July 1971, the first production aircraft was delivered to the Swedish Air Force.

=== Further development ===
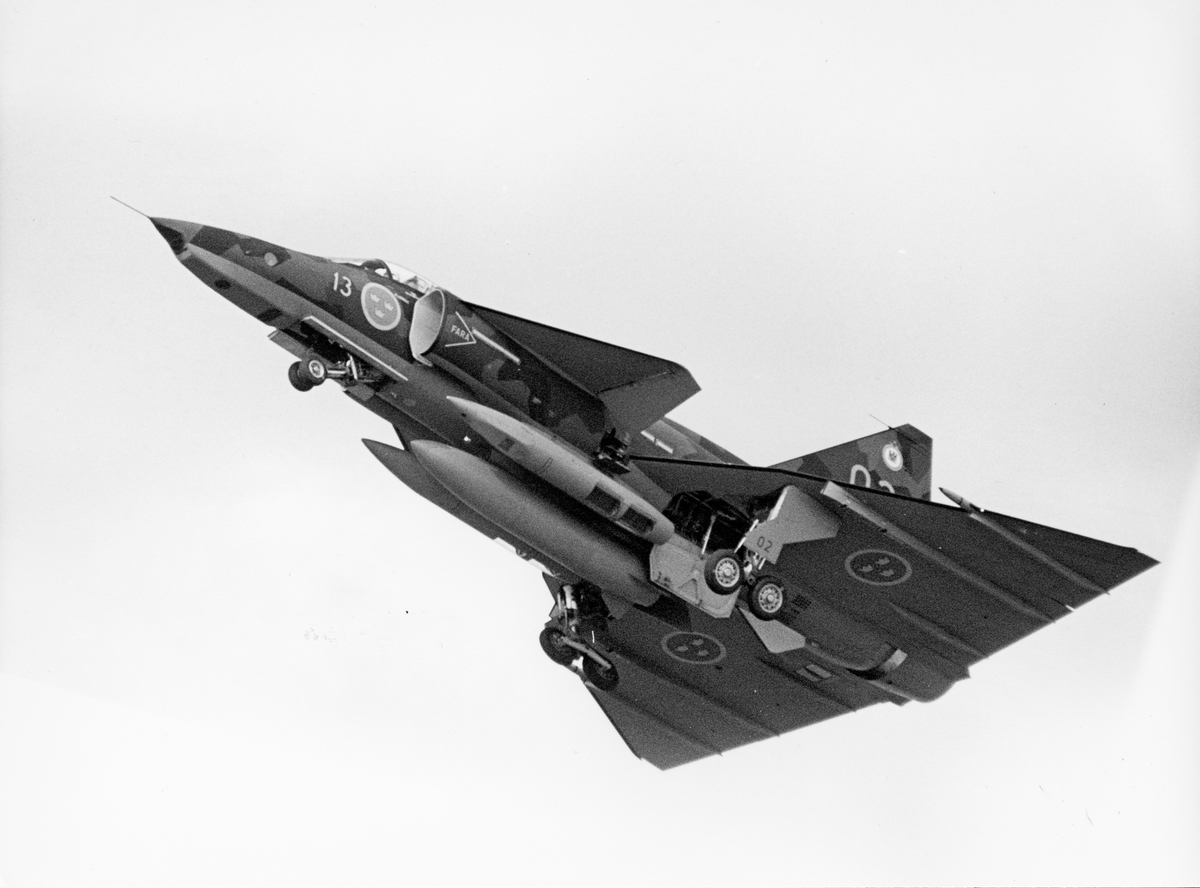
An SF 37 Viggen in flight, 1977

As the initial AJ 37 Viggen was being introduced to service, further variants of the Viggen proceeded to complete development and enter production. In 1972, the first SK 37, an operational trainer variant with a staggered second canopy for an instructor, was delivered to the Swedish Air Force. On 21 May 1973, the first prototype of SF 37 Viggen, a tactical reconnaissance variant featuring a modified nose to accommodate seven sensors, conducted its first flight.

While other variants entered production during the 1960s, Saab continued the development of the more capable all-weather interceptor version of the aircraft, the JA 37. In 1970, Sweden's air defenses had been closely inspected and it was determined that the prospective JA 37 Viggen was highly suited to the role. In 1972, the Swedish government authorized the development of the fighter-interceptor variant to proceed, which was followed by several major contracts for the JA 37's further development. A total of five prototypes would be produced, four of which being modified AJ 37s and one being a sole pre-production JA 37 model, to test the control systems, engine, avionics, and armaments respectively. In June 1974, the first of these prototypes conducted its maiden flight; later that year, an initial order for 30 JA 37s was issued by the Swedish government.

The JA 37 Viggen featured various changes from its predecessor, including revisions to the design of the airframe, the use of the more powerful RM8B powerplant, a new generation of electronics being adopted, and a revised armament configuration employed; the principal externally visible changes from most earlier variants were a taller tailfin and the underfuselage gunpack arrangement. The JA 37, in addition to its principal aerial combat mission, also retained a secondary ground-attack capability, and was better suited to low-level operations. In November 1977, the first production JA 37 Viggen conducted its maiden flight. Operational trials for the new variant were conducted between January and December 1979, which resulted in the type being introduced to operational service that year. According to Flight International, at the time of the JA 37's introduction, it was the most advanced European fighter then in service.

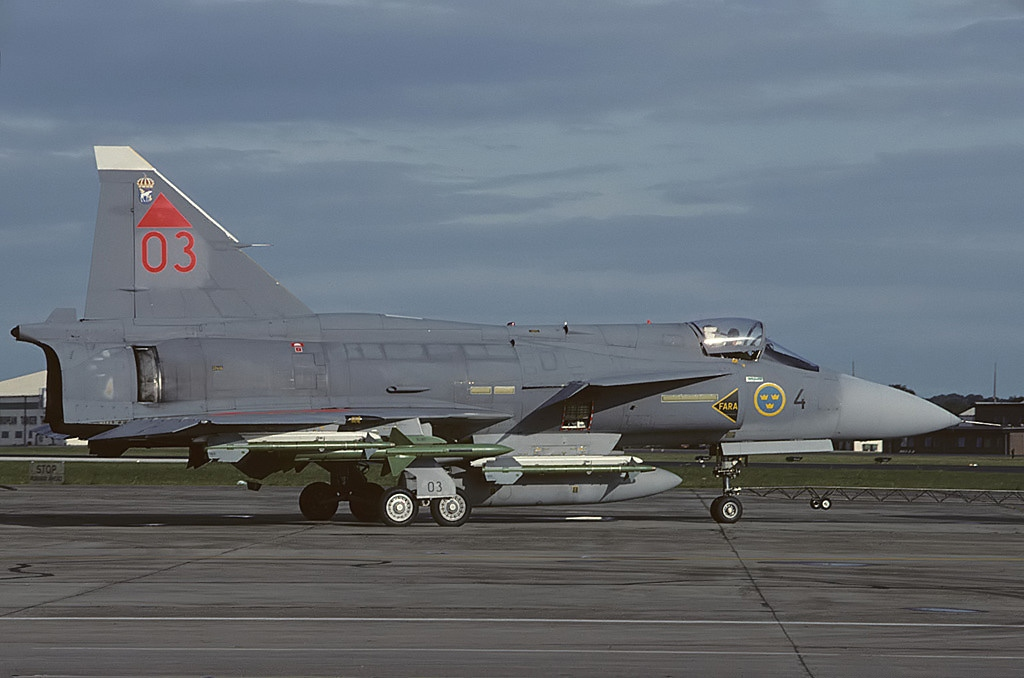
JA 37 Viggen at the Royal International Air Tattoo 1993

In April 1964, the Swedish government revealed its budget proposal for the Swedish Air Force, in which it had been envisioned that 800 or more Viggens would be produced, which was in turn intended to allow all other combat aircraft then in service with the Swedish Air Force to be replaced with this single type. However, a combination of inflation and other factors eventually reduced the total number of aircraft manufactured to 329. By 1980, up to 149 JA 37 Viggens were projected to be built, and the line to be closed within the decade as the Swedish aerospace industry changed focus to the impending Saab JAS 39 Gripen, the Viggen's eventual replacement. Over time, advances in computing, such as the microprocessor, had enabled greater flexibility than the physical configuration of the Viggen, so further development of the Viggen platform was not viewed as cost-effective. In 1990, production of the Viggen ceased and the final aircraft was delivered.

In May 1991, a SEK 300-million program to upgrade 11 AJ37, SF37 and SH37 Viggens to a common multirole variant, designated AJS37, was announced. Amongst the changes involved, interchangeable armaments and sensor payloads were implemented in addition to the adoption of new mission planning and threat analysis computer systems. The onboard ECM systems were also improved. Specifically, the implementation of a new stores management system and MIL-STD-1553 serial data bus, similar to that used on the newer JAS 39 Gripen, allowed for the integration of the AIM-120 AMRAAM air-to-air missile; an upgraded Ericsson PS-46A radar was installed, and a new tactical radio. On 4 June 1996, the first upgraded prototype JA37 Viggen performed its first flight.

In 1996, according to Swedish air force material-department chief General Steffan Nasstrom, the various upgrades performed to the Viggen since its introduction had "doubled the effectiveness of the overall system".

== Design ==
=== Propulsion ===
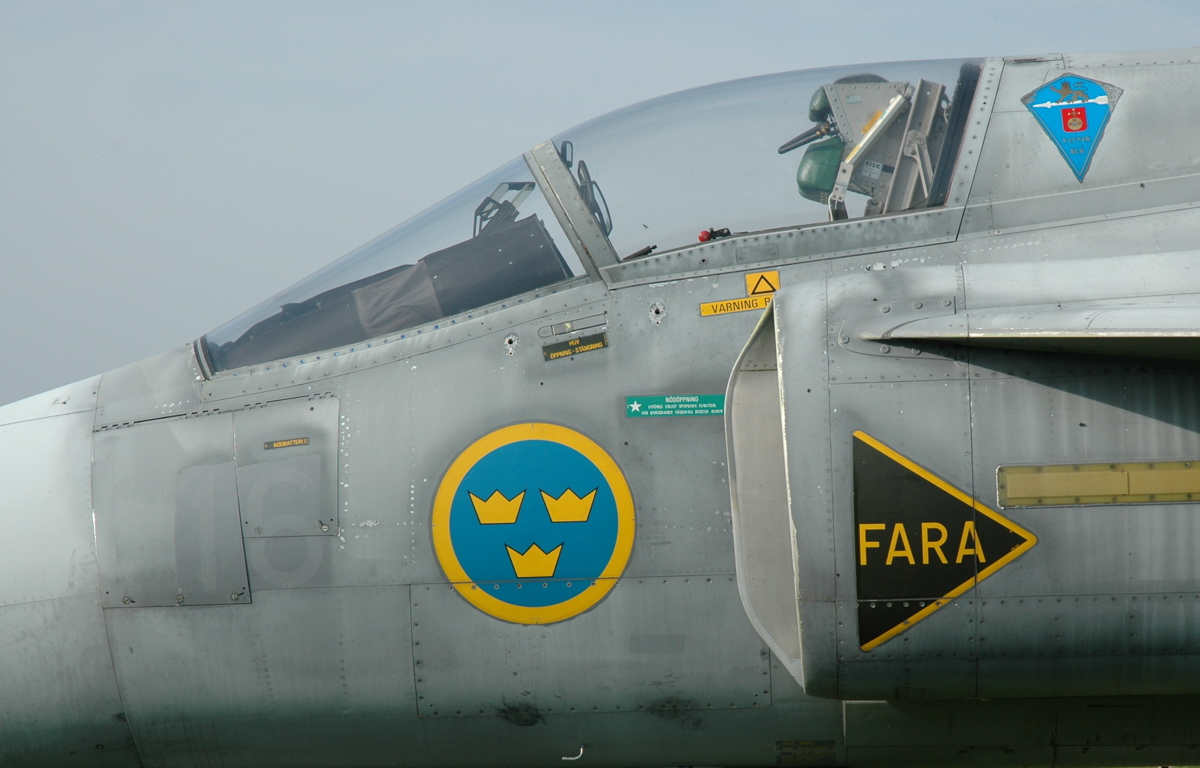
Closeup view of the cockpit and air intake of a JA 37 Viggen

The Viggen was powered by a single Volvo RM8 turbofan. This was essentially a heavily modified licence-built variant of the Pratt & Whitney JT8D engine that powered commercial airliners of the 1960s, with an afterburner added for the Viggen. The airframe also incorporated a thrust reverser to use during landings and land manoeuvres, which, combined with the aircraft having flight capabilities approaching a limited STOL-like performance, enabled operations from 500 m airstrips with minimal support. The thrust reverser could be pre-selected in the air to engage when the nose-wheel strut was compressed after touchdown via a pneumatic trigger.

The requirements from the Swedish Air Force dictated Mach 2 capability at high altitude and Mach 1 at low altitude. At the same time, short-field take-off and landing performance was also required. Since the Viggen was developed initially as an attack aircraft instead of an interceptor (the Saab 35 Draken fulfilled this role), some emphasis was given to low fuel consumption at high subsonic speeds at low level for good range. With turbofan engines just emerging and indicating better fuel economy for cruise than turbojet engines, the former was favoured, since the latter were mainly limited by metallurgy development resulting from limitations in turbine temperature. Mechanical simplicity was also favoured, so the air intakes were simple D-section types with boundary layer splitter plates, while the fixed inlet had no adjustable geometry for improved pressure recovery. The disadvantage was that the required engine would be very large. In fact, at the time of introduction, it was the second-largest fighter engine, with a length of 6.1 m and 1.35 m diameter; only the Tumansky R-15 was bigger.

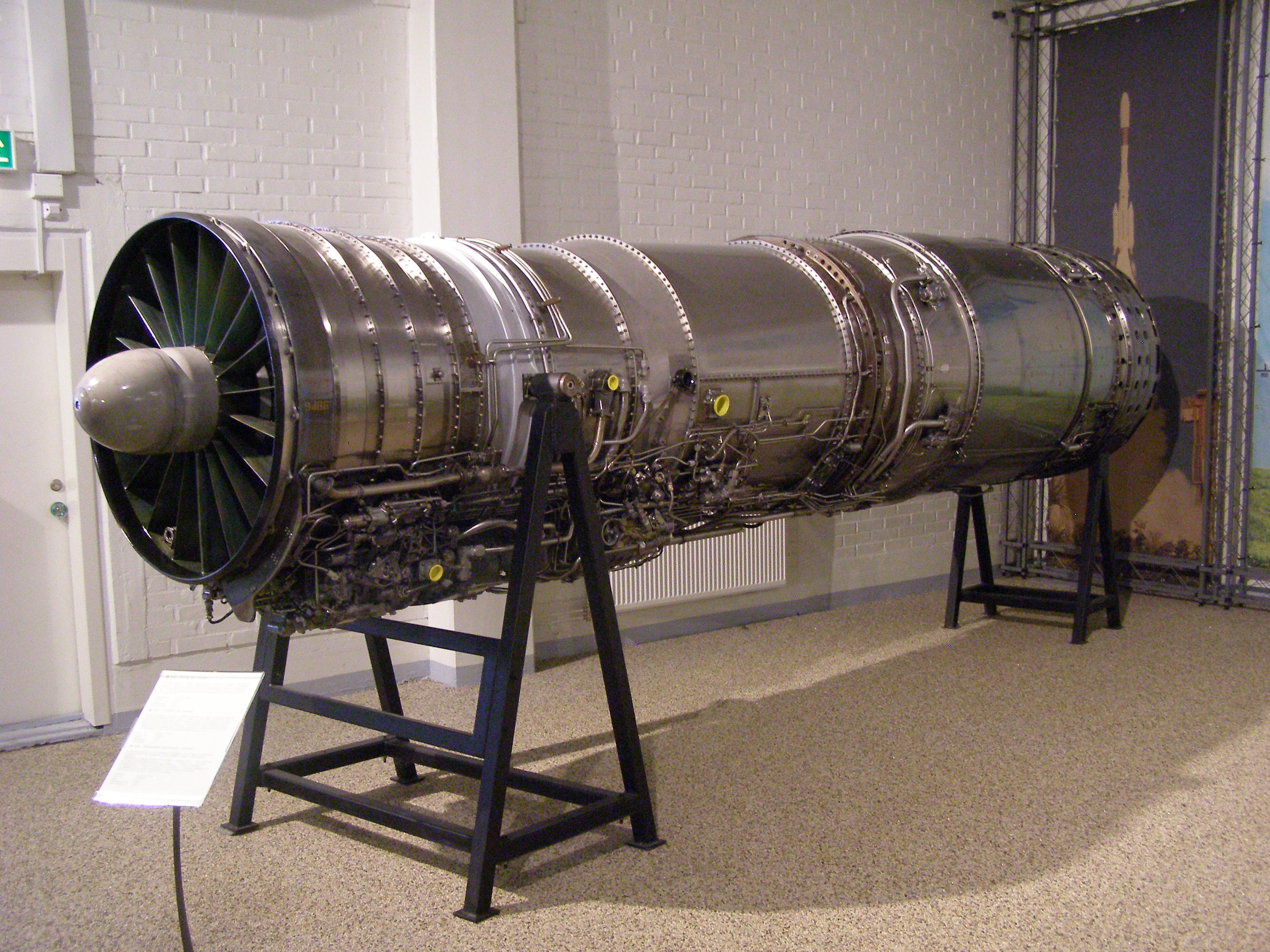
Volvo RM8 on display, 2014

Saab had originally wanted the Rolls-Royce Medway as the Viggen's powerplant. Owing to the cancellation of the Medway, the JT8D was instead chosen as the basis for modification. The RM8 became the second operational afterburning turbofan in the world, and also the first equipped with a thrust reverser. According to aviation author Christopher Chant, the RM8 has the distinction of being the first engine to be fitted with both an afterburner and a thrust reverser. It had a bypass ratio of around 1.07:1 in the RM8A, which reduced to 0.97:1 in the RM8B. The RM8A was the most powerful fighter engine in the late 1960s.

The AJ, SF, SH and SK 37 models of the Viggen had the first version of the RM8A engine with uprated internal components from the JT8D that it was based on. Thrust was 65.6 kN dry and 115.6 kN with afterburner. For the JA 37, the RM8A was developed into the RM8B, achieved by adding a third low-pressure compressor stage over the preceding model, increasing the turbine inlet temperature and fuel diffusion within the combustion chamber. Thrust is 72.1 kN dry and 125.0 kN with afterburner. Owing to the increased length and weight of the RM8B engine over its predecessor, the airframe of the JA 37 was stretched in order to accommodate it. Onboard electrical power was provided by a 60 kVA generator. In the event of an in-flight engine failure, emergency power was provided by an automatically deploying ram air turbine (RAT), capable of generating 6 kVA.

=== Avionics ===
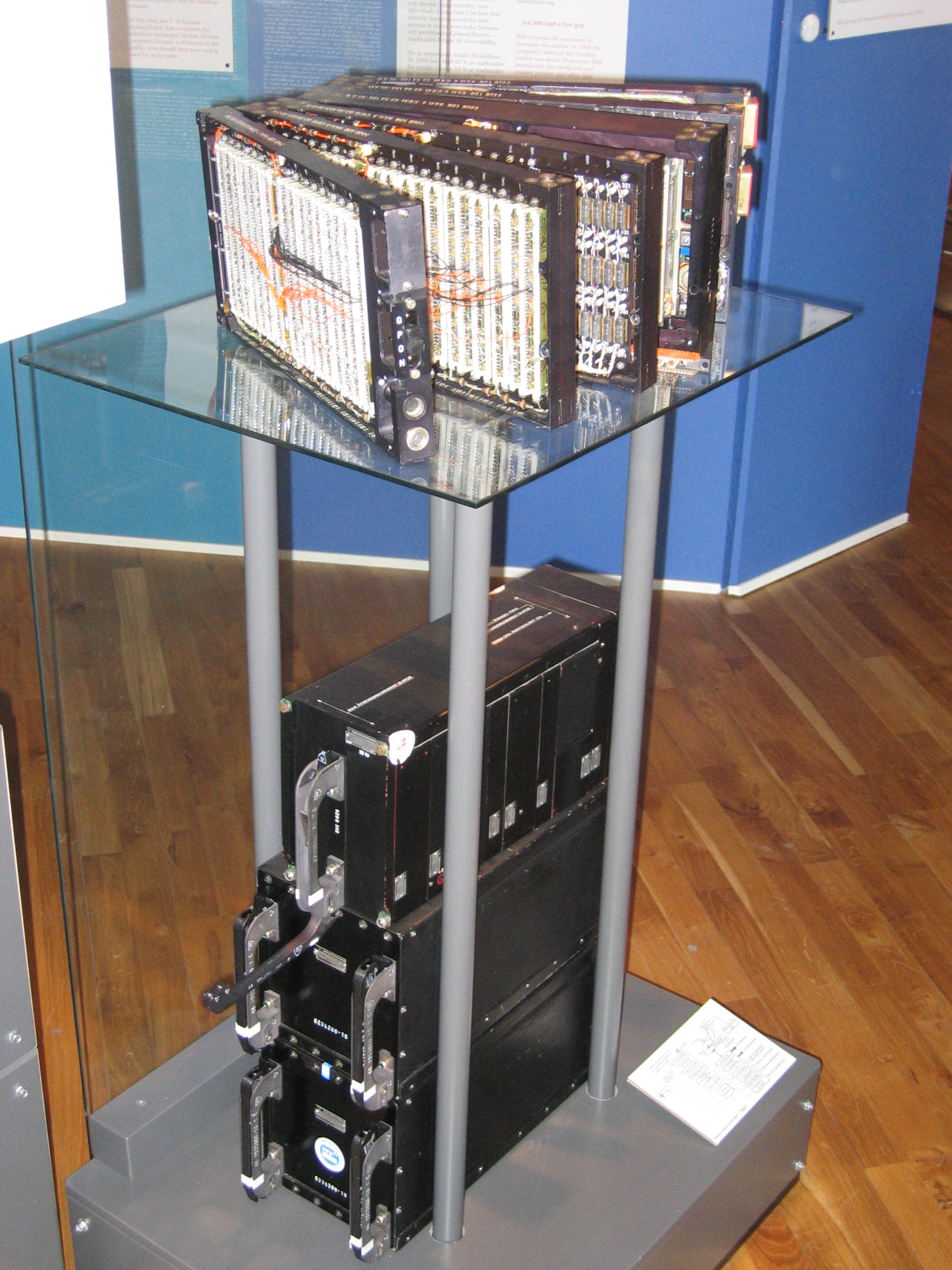
The CK 37 computer

In the early 1960s, it was decided that the Viggen should be a single seat aircraft, Saab having recognized that advanced avionics such as a digital central computer and a head-up display could perform the workload of a human navigator and entirely replace the need for a second crew member. The use of a digital computer would reduce or entirely replace analogue systems, which had proven to be expensive to maintain and alter, as had been the case of the earlier Draken, in addition to accuracy issues. The computer, called CK 37 (short for Centralkalkylator 37, "central calculator 37"), was the world's first airborne computer to use integrated circuits. Developed by Datasaab, the CK 37 was the integrating unit for all electronic equipment to support the pilot, performing functions such as navigation, flight control, and weapon-aiming calculations. In practice, the CK 37 proved to be more reliable than predicted.

On later variants of the Viggen, from the JA37 onwards, it was decided to adopt a newer and more powerful Singer-Kearfott SKC-2037 digital central processor, license-manufactured and further developed by Saab as the CD 107. The computing techniques and concepts, such as distributed computing, went beyond use of the Viggen, in addition to civil-orientated derivatives, it directly contributed to the computers used on board the Viggen's replacement, the Saab JAS 39 Gripen. Various electronic countermeasures (ECM) were installed upon the Viggen, these were typically provided by Satt Elektronik. The ECM systems consisted of a Satt Elektronik radar warning receiver system in the wings and the tail, an optional Ericsson Erijammer pod and BOZ-100 chaff/flare pod. Infrared warning receivers were also later installed. In total, the electronics weighed 600 kg, a substantial amount for a single-engine fighter of the era.

The aircraft's principal sensor was an Ericsson PS 37 X-band monopulse radar, which used a mechanically steered parabolic reflector housed in a radome. This radar performed several functions, including air-to-ground and air-to-air telemetry, search, track, terrain-avoidance and cartography. On the JA 37 fighter-interceptor model, the PS 37 radar was replaced by the more capable Ericsson PS 46 X-band pulse-doppler radar, which had an all-weather look-down/shoot-down capability reportedly in excess of 50 kilometers and continuous-wave illumination for the Skyflash missiles as well as the ability to track two targets while scanning. According to Ericsson, it had a 50 percent chance of spotting a low-flying McDonnell Douglas F-4 Phantom II within a single scan and possessed a high level of resistance to interference from ECM.

Saab and Honeywell co-developed an automatic digital flight control system for the JA 37 Viggen, which has been claimed to be the first such system in a production aircraft. To assist low altitude flight, a Honeywell radar altimeter with transmitter and receiver in the canard wings was used. The aircraft was also fitted with a Decca Type 72 Doppler navigation radar. TILS (Tactical Instrument Landing System), a landing-aid system made by Cutler-Hammer AIL, improved landing accuracy to 30 m from the threshold on the short highway airbase system. In order to effectively enforce Sweden's air space, the Viggen was integrated with STRIL 60 national defence system. The JA 37 Viggen was also equipped with a Garrett AiResearch digital Central Air Data Computer, modified from the unit used upon the Grumman F-14 Tomcat.

Initially, only a single reconnaissance (S) variant was considered, but fitting cameras as well as a radar proved to be impossible. The SH 37 maritime strike and reconnaissance variant was very similar to the AJ 37 and differed mainly in a maritime-optimized PS 371/A radar with longer range, a cockpit air-data camera and tape recorder for mission analysis. "Red Baron" and a SKa 24D 600 mm LOROP camera pods were usually carried on the fuselage pylons. The centreline fuel tank was converted for a short period of time to a camera pod with two Recon/Optical CA-200 1676 mm cameras. In addition to the reconnaissance equipment, the SH 37 could also use all weapons for the AJ 37. For the photographic SF version, the radar in the nose was omitted in favour of four SKa 24C 120 mm and two SKa 31 570 mm photographic cameras as well as one 57 mm VKa 702 Infrared linescan camera and air-data camera; all of which were integrated with and controlled by the aircraft's central computer. Additional equipment, such as more camera pods, fuel tanks, ECM pods, and self-defense air-to-air missiles could also be carried upon the fuselage pylons.

The fighter-interceptor version of the Viggen, the JA 37, featured various avionics changes, including the extensive use of digital electronics alongside mechanical technology. In 1985, the "fighter link" entered service, permitting encrypted data communication between up to four fighters; this enabled one fighter to "paint" an airborne enemy with guidance radar for the Skyflash missiles of the three other fighters in a group while they had their own search and guidance radars switched off. This system was operational ten years before any other country's. The autopilot was also slaved to the radar control to obtain better precision firing the cannon. Once in service, the Viggen's software was regularly updated every 18 months. In 1983, the mean time between failures (MTBF) was reported as 100 hours, a very high reliability level for the generation of avionics systems involved.

=== Cockpit ===
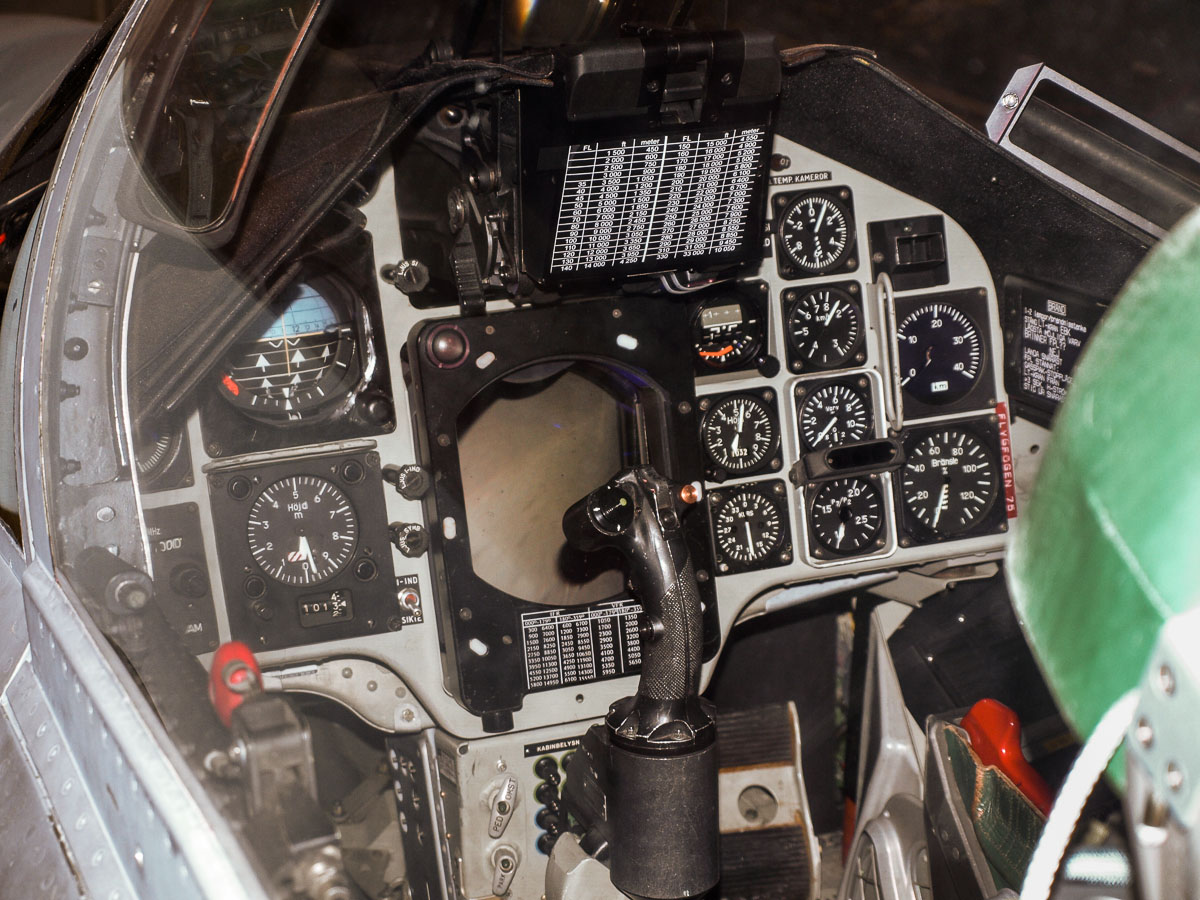
Cockpit of an AJSF 37 Viggen

The displays in the original cockpit were all of the traditional analogue/mechanical type with the exception of an electronic head-up display (HUD), which Saab has claimed makes the Viggen easier to fly, especially at low altitudes during air-to-ground strike missions. Unusually for a 1970s fighter, the JA 37 variant of the Viggen featured three multi-purpose cathode-ray tube (CRT) display screens fitted within the cockpit, in a system called AP-12, developed by Saab and Ericsson. These displays would be used to display processed radar information, computer-generated maps, flight and weapons data, along with steering cues during precision landings.

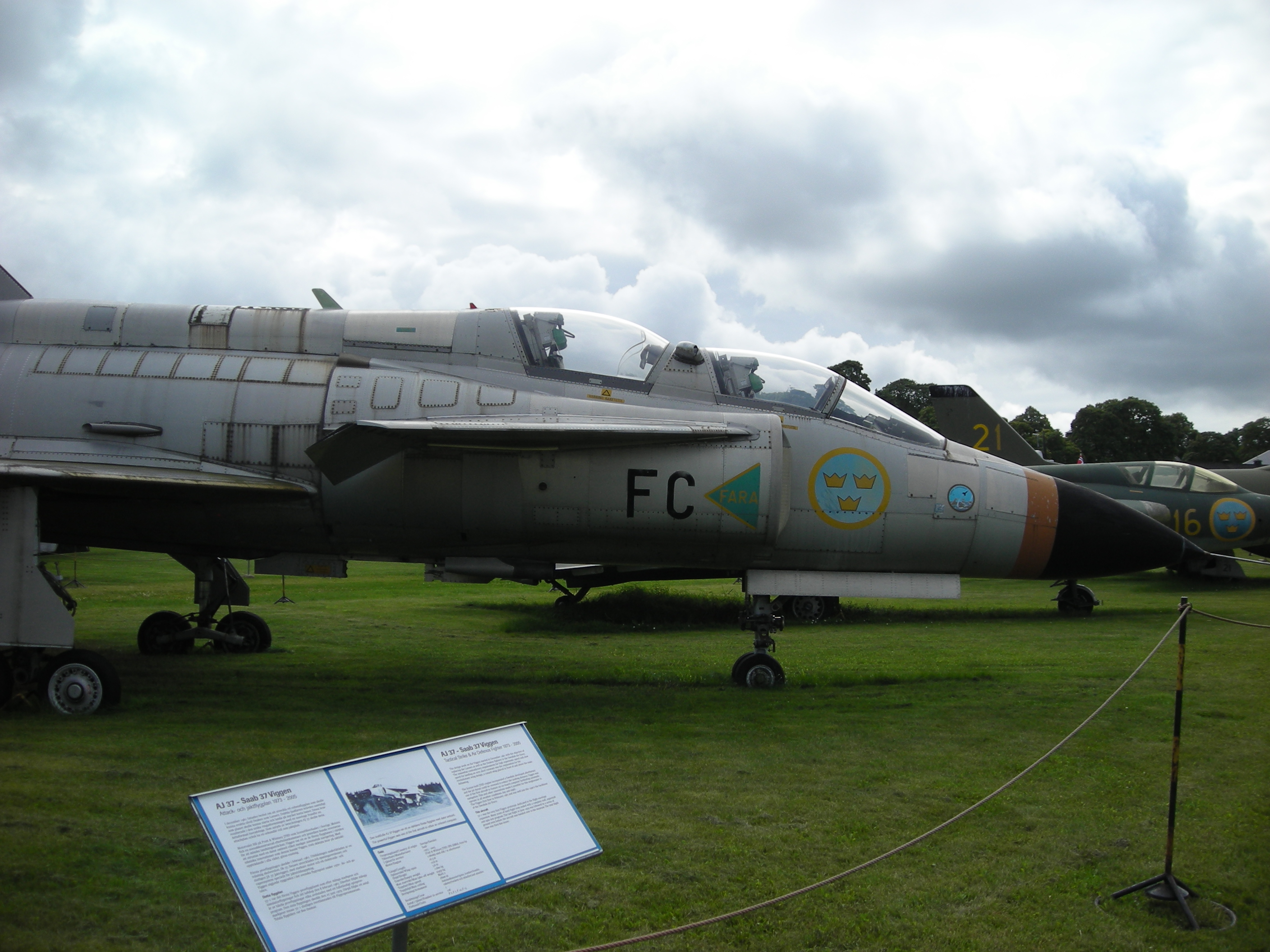
A two-seat SK 37 Viggen on display

Between 1989 and 1992, the AP-12 display system was subject to a substantial upgrade. In 1999, a new tactical liquid-crystal display (LCD) system derived from the Saab JAS 39 Gripen, which replaced the CRT-based AP-12 system, began flight tests with the Swedish Air Force. On the twin-seat SK 37 trainer, the rear cockpit used by the instructor is only fitted with conventional instrumentation and lacks a HUD, computer controls and other features.

The ejection seat was the Raketstol 37 (literally; Rocket chair 37) and was the last Saab designed seat in service. A derivative of the Saab 105 trainer seat, the seat was optimized for low altitude, high speed ejections. Once activated by the pilot via triggers built into the armrests (on twin-seat models, the occupant of the forward cockpit position is able to initiate the ejection of both seats), the ejection sequence is automated, including the removal of the canopy; in the event of a malfunction, a reserve trigger can be activated. A combined parachute and seat harness is used, which features a barometric interlock to appropriately release the occupant and harness from the seat during the ejection sequence, a manual override handle is also provided for this function.

There were dedicated warning caption panels on each side of the pilot's legs. On the right console panel were numerous dedicated controls and indicators, including weapons and missile controls, nav panel, oxygen on/off, windshield de-fogging, IFF control, lighting controls. Situated on the left console panel were radar controls, canopy handle, landing gear handle, radio controls and the cabin pressure indicator. As per then-standard practice within the Swedish Air Force, all cockpit instrumentation and labeling were in Swedish.

=== Wings and airframe ===
With the performance requirements to a large extent dictating the choice of the engine, the airframe turned out to be quite bulky compared to contemporary slimmer designs with turbojet engines. The first prototypes had a straight midsection fuselage that was later improved with a "hump" on the dorsal spine for reduced drag according to the area rule. The wing had the shape of a double delta with a dogtooth added to improve longitudinal stability at high incidence angles.

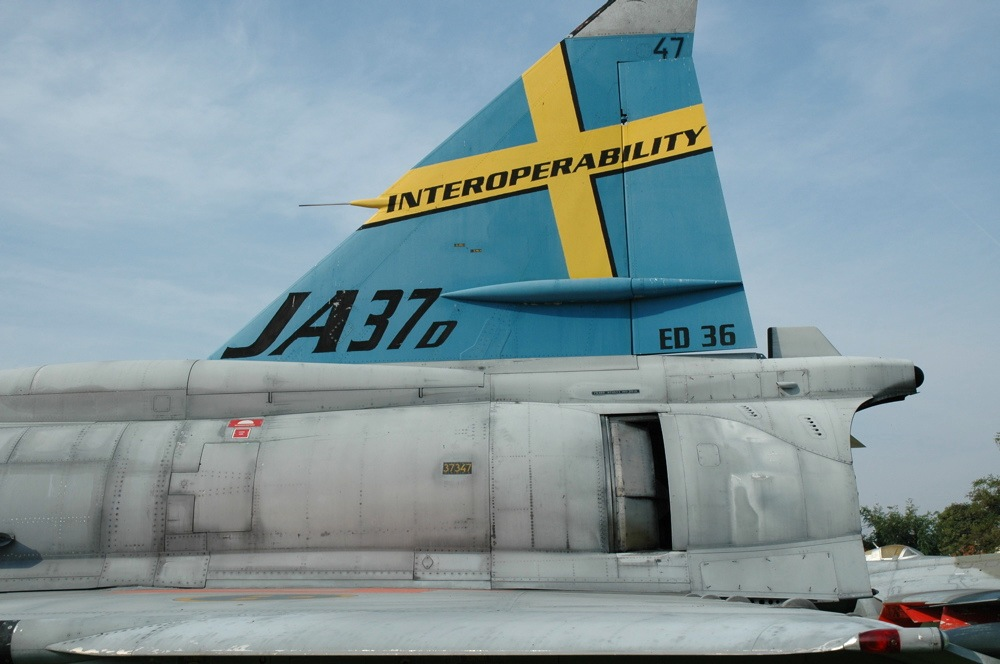
Vertical stabilizer

A consequence of a tailless delta design, such as in the Viggen, is that the elevons, which replace more conventional control surfaces, operate with a small effective moment arm; their use adds substantial weight to the aircraft at takeoff and landing. Hinged leading edge surfaces can help counteract this, but an even more effective tool is the canard. The canard surfaces were positioned behind the inlets and placed slightly higher than the main wing, with a higher stall angle than the wing, and were equipped with flaps. The lifting canard surfaces act as a vortex generator for the main wing and therefore provide more lift. An added benefit was that they also improved roll stability in the transonic region. The canard flaps were deployed in conjunction with the landing gear to provide even more lift for takeoff and landing.

To withstand the stresses of no-flare landings, Saab made extensive use of aluminium in the airframe of the Viggen, which was constructed using a bonded metal honeycomb structure; the entire rear section of the fuselage, downstream of the engine nozzle, formed a heat-resistant ring composed of titanium. The main landing gear, manufactured by Motala Verkstad, was highly strengthened as well; each leg held two small wheels fitted with anti-skid brakes placed in a tandem arrangement. The design requirements imposed by the large anti-ship missiles employed upon the Viggen necessitated that both the undercarriage and vertical stabilizer be quite tall. To accommodate this, and to allow the main landing gear to be stowed outside of the wing root, the undercarriage legs shortened during retraction. The vertical stabilizer could also be folded via an actuator in order that the aircraft could be stored in smaller hangars, hardened aircraft shelters, and underground hangars, the latter of which were employed by the Swedish military to limit the damage of preemptive attacks.

The six tanks in the fuselage and wings held approximately 5,000 litres of fuel with an additional 1,500 litres in an external drop tank. The specific fuel consumption was only 0.63 for cruise speeds (fuel consumption was rated 18 mg/Ns dry and 71 with afterburner). The Viggen's consumption was around 15 kg/s at maximum afterburner. A pair of inlets placed alongside the cockpit feed air to the engine; simple fixed-geometry inlets were adopted, similar to the Draken, except for being larger and standing clear of the fuselage.

=== Armament ===
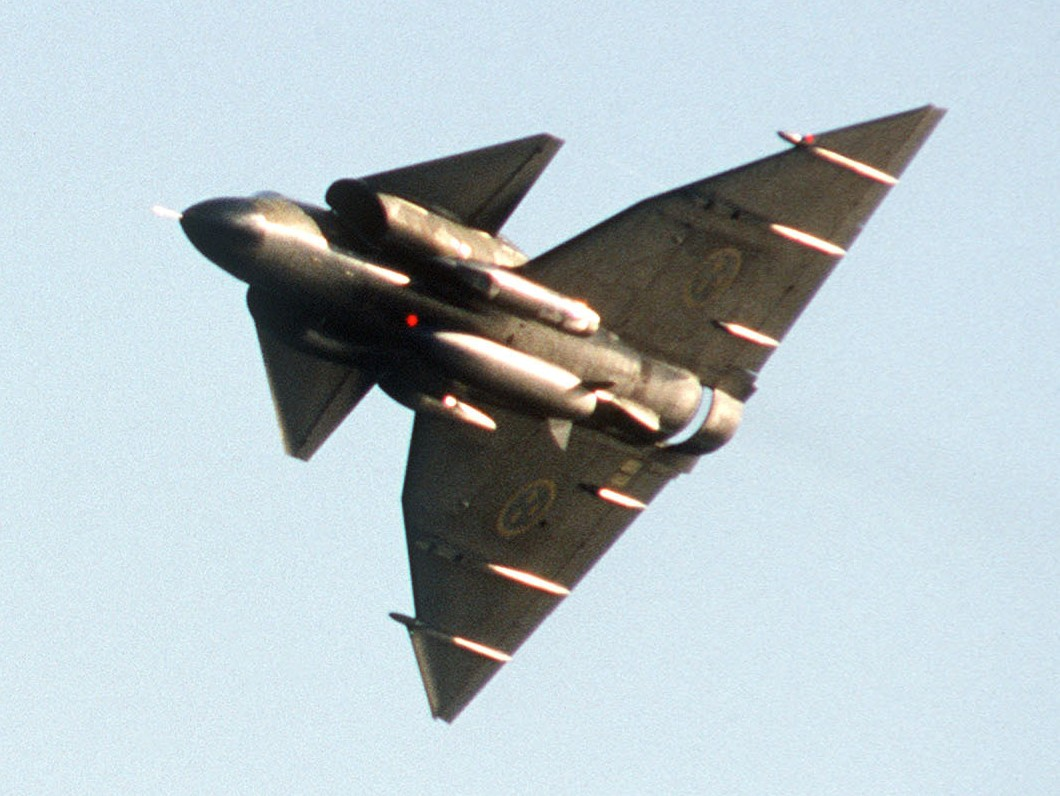
Underside of a Viggen, 1985. The empty weapons pylons are visible.

A weapons load of up to 7,000 kg could be accommodated on nine hardpoints: one centreline pylon, two fuselage pylons, two inner and two outer wing pylons and two pylons behind the wing landing gear. The centreline pylon was the only pylon plumbed for carrying an external fuel tank, and was usually so occupied. A pair of air-to-air missiles were intended to be placed on the outboard wing pylons, which were more lightweight than the other attachment points. The pylons behind the landing gear were not used until the JA 37D modification when BOL countermeasure dispensers were fitted to them. Ground crew would enter the munitions fitted into the aircraft's central computer using a load-selector panel, which would automatically choose the correct values for fire control, fuel consumption, and other calculations.

==== AJ 37 ====
The AJ 37 was typically equipped with a total of seven hardpoints, three underneath the fuselage and two under each wing, a further two wing-mounted hardpoints could be optionally fitted but this facility was rarely used. Various munitions could be carried, such as several types of rockets: the 135 mm M56GP 4 kg armour-piercing, the M56B with 6.9 kg of high explosives, and the M70 with a 4.7 kg HEAT warhead.

The AJ 37 was designed to carry two RB 04E anti-ship missiles on the inboard wing pylons with an optional third missile on the centreline pylon. The RB-04 was a relatively simple cruise missile that was further developed to become the more capable RBS-15, also integrated on the Viggen. An optional load consisted of two Rb 05 air-to-surface missiles on the fuselage pylons. The RB 05 was later replaced by AGM-65 Maverick (Swedish designation "RB 75") television-guided missiles. In a ground-attack role, a combination of unguided 135 mm rockets in sextuple pods and 120 kg fragmentation bombs on quadruple-mounts could be used. Other armaments include explosive mines, and 30 mm ADEN cannon pods with 150 rounds of ammunition on the inboard wing pylons.

Self-defence measures included various ECM systems, as well as either the AIM-4 Falcon (Swedish designation "RB 28") or AIM-9 Sidewinder (Swedish designation "RB 24") air-to-air missiles. At one point, the AJ 37 Viggen was under consideration as a carrier of both a Swedish nuclear weapon and chemical weapons, although no nuclear or chemical weapons were ultimately adopted by Sweden.

==== JA 37 ====
The JA 37 fighter interceptor, introduced in 1979, featured the Ericsson PS 46/A radar which was capable of guiding the medium-range semi-active radar homing RB 71 Skyflash air-to-air missiles. Both the RB 71 and the PS 46/A radar were designed to provide the Viggen with a look-down/shoot-down capability and to engage targets at beyond visual range distances. The JA 37 could carry up to two RB 71s on the inner wing pylons; in a typical air defense loadout, these would typically have been combined with four RB 24J air-to-air missiles, a more capable and newer version of the Sidewinder missile than employed on earlier Viggen variants.

Following the evaluation of several alternative cannons, including the British ADEN cannon, the American M61 Vulcan, and French DEFA cannon, an Oerlikon KCA 30mm cannon was selected for the JA 37. The KCA was carried, along with 126 rounds of ammunition, in a conformal pod under the fuselage. The firing rate of the cannon was selectable at 22 or 11 rounds per second. It fired the same cartridge as the GAU-8, reportedly 50% heavier shells at a higher velocity than the ADEN cannon, resulting in six and a half times the kinetic energy on impact, and was effective up to 2,000 meters. This, in conjunction with the fire control system, allowed air-to-air engagements at longer range than other fighters.

Perhaps the most important improvement was the expanded STRIL datalink which entered service in 1982–85. It allowed not only ground control-aircraft communication, but also between up to four aircraft simultaneously regardless if airborne or on the ground. Datalink information was displayed on the Horizontal Situation Display and a tactical display, the latter using link symbology that could be overlaid with an electronic map on a multifunction display.

== Operational history ==
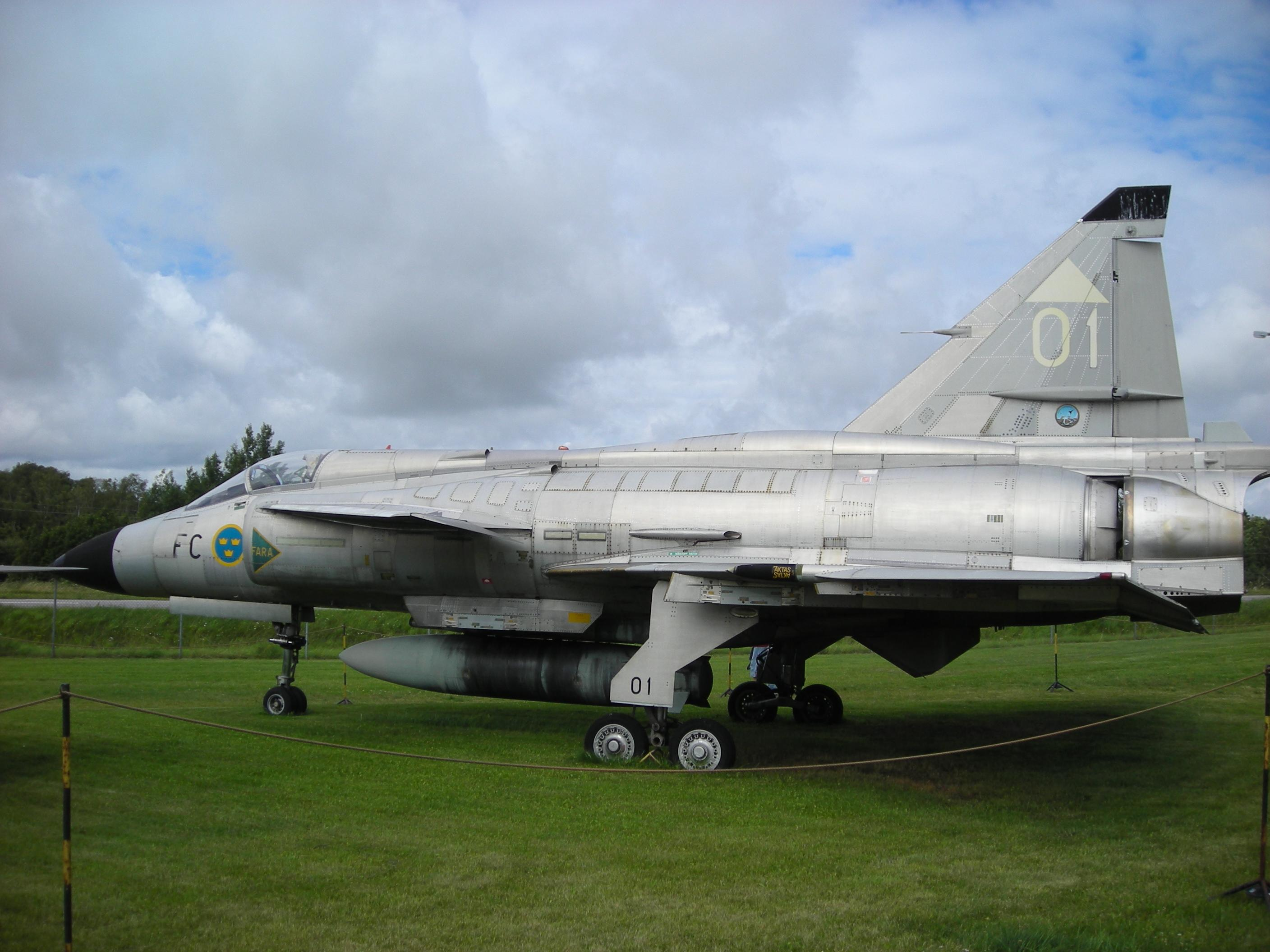
The first production JA 37 Viggen at the Swedish Air Force Museum

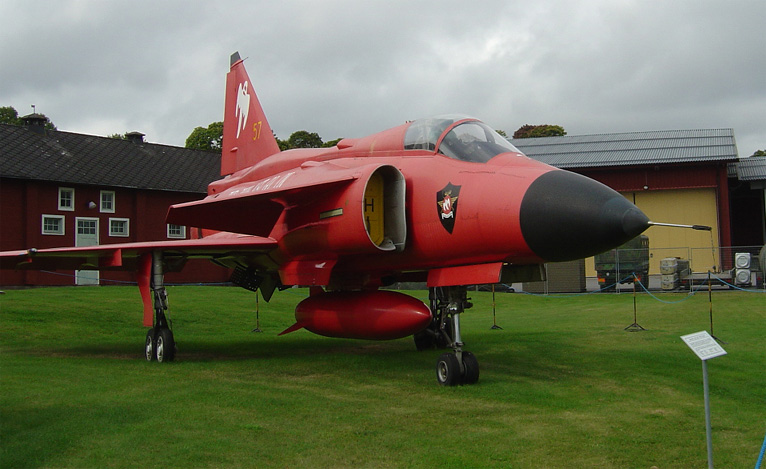
This AJS 37 was painted red in 1999 for the last years of Viggen sorties at F 10 Ängelholm.

In July 1971, the first production AJ 37 Viggen was delivered to the Swedish Air Force. The Skaraborg Wing (F 7) became the first wing to receive deliveries of both the single-seat AJ 37 attack model and the twin-seat SK 37 training model of the Viggen, whereupon the type began to replace their existing Lansen aircraft. Conversion training to pilot the Viggen involved a minimum of 450 flight hours performed on an initial mixture of the Saab 105, the Lansen, and finally the Viggen itself; dedicated Viggen simulators were also used, the latter of which was seen as a decisive factor in the ease of conversion to the type.

In October 1973, Skaraborg Wing was reportedly close to achieving full operational effectiveness; by May 1974, the Swedish Air Force had two operational squadrons using the Viggen along with a third squadron in the final process of achieving that status. By 1974, the safety and reliability levels of the Viggen were reportedly above expectations, despite the overall complexity and relative newness of the aircraft. In practice, one of the most significant issues encountered with the Viggen during low-level flight, as extensively performed during a typical attack mission profile, was the threat posed by birds; thus, the Swedish Air Force paid close attention to their migratory patterns.

During the later half of the 1970s and into the 1980s, the introduction of various variants of the Viggen proceeded; these included the SK 37, a two-seat operational-conversion trainer, introduced in 1972, the SF 37, an overland reconnaissance model, introduced in 1977, and the SH 37, a maritime reconnaissance version, introduced in 1975. By September 1980, the JA 37 fighter-interceptor model of the Viggen was introduced, Bråvalla Wing (F 13) being the first wing of the Swedish Air Force to convert to the new type. The Viggen went on to become Sweden's primary air defense platform for many years.

The Viggen was designed to be simple to maintain, even by conscripted flight line mechanics with limited technical training. A single Viggen could be maintained by a team of five conscripts under the supervision of a single chief mechanic. Standard turnaround, including refueling and rearming, took less than ten minutes to perform; while an engine replacement took four hours. Over the long term, the Viggen required 22-man hours per flight hour of maintenance work at the depot level, and nine-man hours per flight hour at the front line.

By the mid-1980s, Swedish Viggen fighter pilots, using the predictable patterns of Lockheed SR-71 Blackbird routine flights over the Baltic Sea, had managed to achieve radar lock-on with radar on the SR-71 on numerous occasions. Despite heavy jamming from the SR-71, target illumination was maintained by feeding target location from ground-based radars to the fire-control computer in the Viggen. The most common site for the lock-on to occur was the thin stretch of international airspace between Öland and Gotland that the SR-71 used on the return flight. The Viggen is the only aircraft to get an acknowledged radar lock on the SR-71.

=== Retirement ===
By 1994, the replacement of the Viggen by the later and more advanced Saab JAS 39 Gripen was in progress, the type being progressively phased out as greater numbers of Gripen aircraft were delivered. On 25 November 2005, the last front line Viggen was formally retired by the Swedish Air Force. A few aircraft were kept in an operational condition for electronic warfare training against the Gripen at F 17M in Linköping; the last of these Viggen flights took place in June 2007.

=== Overseas sales efforts ===
Although Saab offered the Viggen for sale worldwide, and was the subject of a heavy marketing campaign in both European and developing countries during the 1970s, ultimately no export sales were made.

During the 1970s, Saab proposed a new variant of the Viggen, designated the Saab 37E Eurofighter (unrelated to the later Eurofighter Typhoon), for the United States Air Force Air Combat Fighter competition to find a replacement for the Lockheed F-104 Starfighter. The 37E Eurofighter competed against Dassault-Breguet's proposed Mirage F1M-53, the SEPECAT Jaguar, Northrop's P-530 Cobra (on which the YF-17 was based), and General Dynamics's YF-16; on 13 January 1975, United States Secretary of the Air Force John L. McLucas announced the YF-16 had been selected as the winner of the ACF competition.

In 1978, the United States blocked a major prospective sale to India, which would have involved selling a number of Swedish-built Viggens in addition to a licensed production agreement under which the Viggen would also have been built in India, by not issuing an export license for the RM8/JT8D engine and other American technologies used. India later opted to procure the SEPECAT Jaguar in its place. According to leaked United States diplomatic cables, India's interest in the Viggen was reported to be entirely due to Rajiv Gandhi's influence, and had alleged have been without any input from the Indian Air Force. According to author Chris Smith, the Viggen had been the favoured candidate for the Indian Air Force prior to the deal being blocked by the US.

== Variants ==
AJ 37
Primarily a single-seat ground-attack fighter aircraft (AJ: Attack-Jakt), with a secondary fighter role. RM8A powerplant. PS 37A radar. First delivery in mid-1971, 108 built, with serial numbers 37001–108. 48 airframes upgraded to AJS 37. Partially decommissioned in 1998.
SK 37
Two-seat trainer aircraft (Sk: Skol) with no radar and reduced fuel. First flight on 2 July 1970. 17 built, with delivery from June 1972, serial numbers 37801–817. Decommissioned in 2003, 10 airframes converted to SK 37E.
SF 37
(SF: Spaning Foto) Single-seat photographic reconnaissance aircraft , with radar replaced by battery of cameras in nose, with provision for additional reconnaissance pods. It made its first flight on 21 May 1973. 28 built, with deliveries from April 1977, serial numbers 37950–977. 25 airframes upgraded to AJSF 37. Partially decommissioned in 1998.
SH 37
(SH: Spaning Hav, reconnaissance sea) Single-seat maritime reconnaissance and strike aircraft, equipped with PS-371A radar. 27 built, with delivery from June 1975, serial numbers 37901–927. 25 airframes upgraded to AJSH 37. Partially decommissioned in 1998.
Saab 37E Eurofighter
Proposed NATO replacement of F-104 Starfighter in 1975, none built.
Saab 37X
Proposed export version offered to Norway in 1967–68, none built.
JA 37
Primarily a single-seat all-weather interceptor fighter, with a secondary attack role. Its first flight was on 27 September 1974 with the first deliveries starting in 1979, serial numbers 37301–449. A 10 cm (4 in) stretch in the shape of a wedge wider at the bottom than on the top of AJ 37 fuselage between canard and main wing. PS 46A LD/SD radar. Partially decommissioned in 1998, some upgraded to JA 37D.
AJS/AJSF/AJSH 37
Upgrade of some AJ/SF/SH 37 between 1993 and 1998. Avionics and software upgrade. 48 AJ 37 airframes modified. 25 SH 37 airframes modified. 25 SF 37 airframes modified. Decommissioned in 2005.
JA 37C
Upgrade of older JA 37, avionics and software upgrade as well as the integration of countermeasures.
JA 37D
Upgrade of older JA 37 between 1993 and 1998, avionics and software upgrade. Rb99 air-to-air missile (AIM-120 in Swedish service) integrated. 35 airframes modified.
JA 37DI
JA 37D with avionics and software modified for international duties. Instruments labeled in English and feet/knots instead of meter/kmh. 20 airframes modified.
SK 37E
Electronic warfare trainer, conversion of 10 obsolete SK 37 trainers from 1998 to 2000, serial numbers 37807–811 & 37813–817, decommissioned in 2007.
37AU
Proposed Australian export variant with AIM-54 Phoenix missiles. Cancelled in favour of F/A-18 Hornet.

== Operators ==
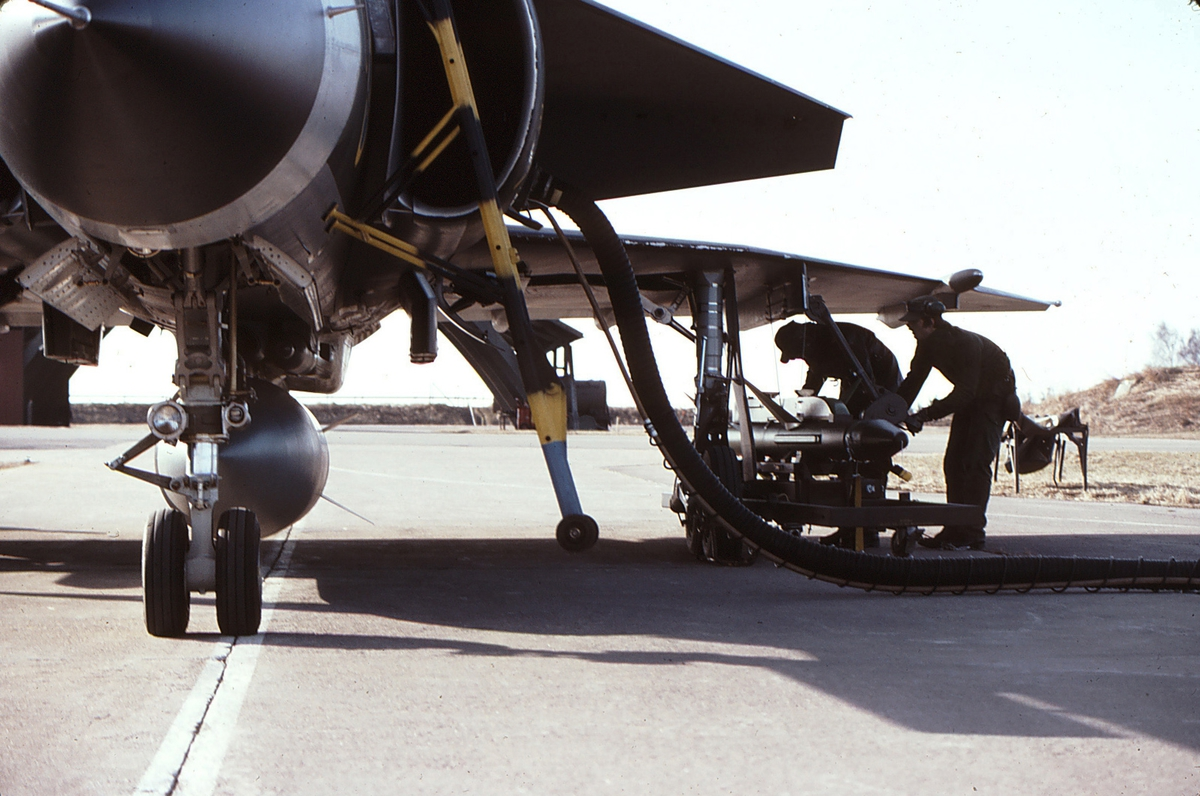
Saab 37 Viggen being serviced on the ground, April 1982

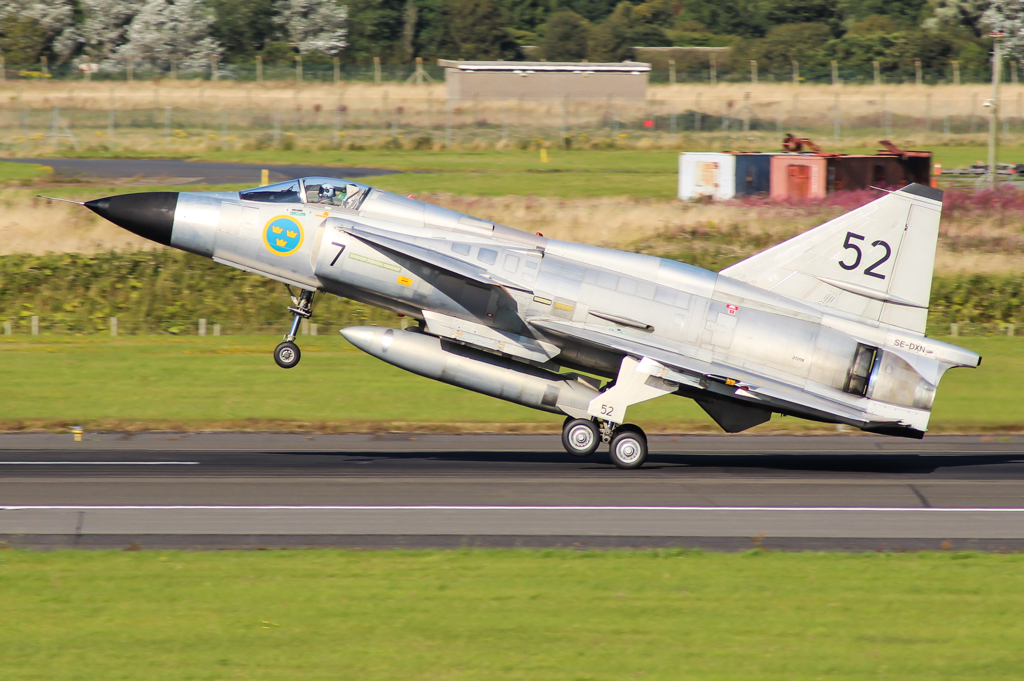
Viggen landing at Prestwick, Scotland, 2015

External videos
- Swedish documentary on the Viggen
- Viggen display flight at an air show
- Multiple Viggens performing a mock dogfight

Sweden

- Swedish Air Force

=== Operational units ===
- F 4 Frösön
  - 2 squadrons JA 37 1983–2003
  - 1 squadron SK 37 1999–2003
  - 1 squadron SK 37E 1999–2003
- F 6 Karlsborg
  - 2 squadrons AJ 37 1978–1993
- F 7 Såtenäs
  - 3 squadrons AJ 37 1972–1998
  - 1 squadron SK 37 1972–1974
- F 10 Ängelholm
  - 1 squadron AJ/SF/SH 37 (combined) 1993–2001
- F 13 Norrköping
  - 1 squadron SF/SH 37 (combined) 1977–1993
  - 1 squadron JA 37 1980–1993
- F 15 Söderhamn
  - 2 squadrons AJ 37 1974–1998
  - 1 squadron SK 37 1974–1998
- F 16 Uppsala
  - 2 squadrons JA 37 1986–2003
- F 17 Kallinge
  - 1 squadron JA 37 1981–2002
  - 1 squadron SF/SH 37 (combined) 1979–1993
  - 1 squadron JA 37 1993–2002
- F 21 Luleå
  - 2 squadrons JA 37 1983–2004
  - 1 squadron SF/SH 37 1979–2002
  - 1 squadron SK 37E (combined) 2003–2007

== Accident and incidents ==
Very little is publicized about Sweden's military air accidents and incidents, however, an incident resulting in a fatality of a Saab 37 pilot during a reconnaissance fly-by of Russian nuclear-powered battlecruiser Pyotr Velikiy occurred on 16 October 1996, and is the last known operational fatality of 19 total known fatalities (in over 50 accidents) involving the Saab 37 Viggen in its almost 40 years of operational history.

== Surviving aircraft ==
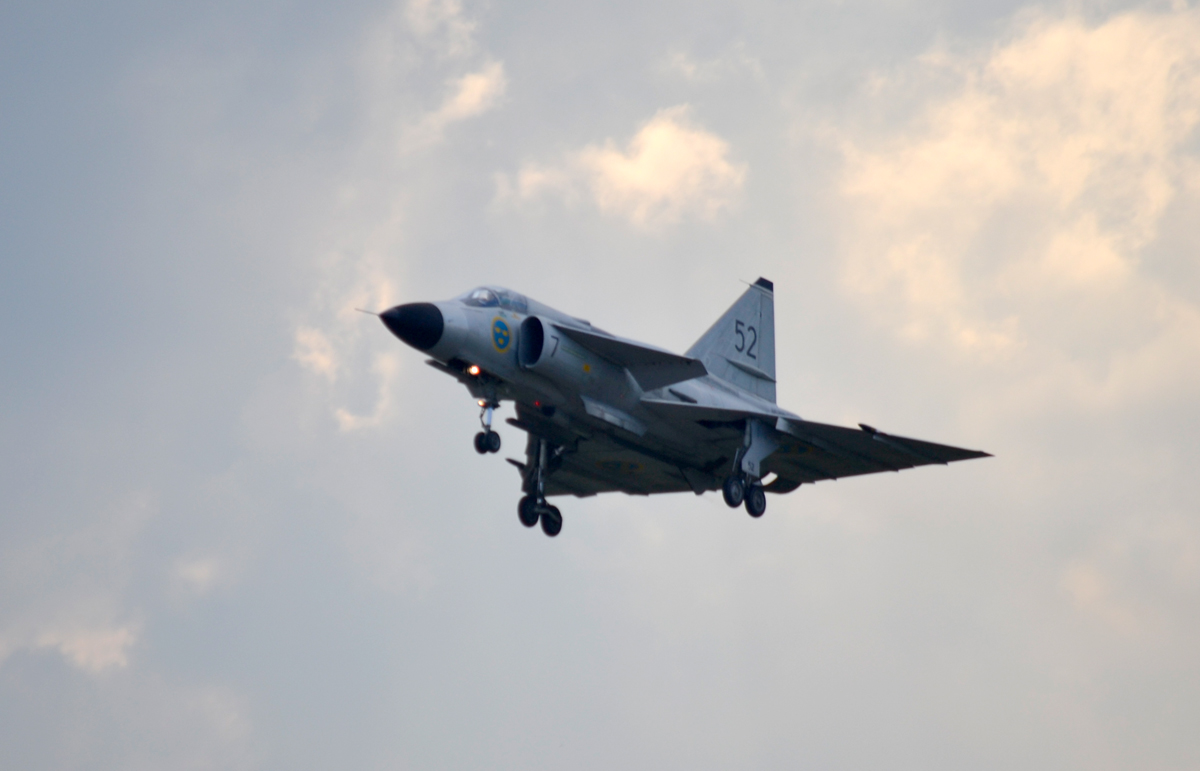
Viggen 37098 landing after displaying at Leuchars, 2013

- An AJS 37 Viggen (s/n 37098) with the code F 7–52 has been retained and went through a long period of restoration and maintenance to be airworthy again. This Viggen was built in 1977 and served all its active duty in F 15 Wing at Söderhamn. It was transferred into civil registry with the registration number SE-DXN. It undertook its maiden flight after having been approved by the authorities on 27 March 2012 from the F 7 Wing at Såtenäs. The Viggen is unpainted to represent the first delivered Viggens as they looked in the early 1970s.
- An SK 37E Viggen (two seat trainer) (s/n 37809) with the code F 15-61 has been retained and went through a period of restoration and maintenance to be airworthy again. This Viggen was built in 1973 and served its first activities in F 7 Wing at Såtenäs, later in F 15 Wing at Söderhamn and finally in FMV Prov at Linköping until 2007. It was transferred into civil registry with the registration number SE-DXO. It undertook its maiden flight 15 May 2018 from the F 7 Wing at Såtenäs after having been approved by the authorities on 21 March 2018 The Viggen is painted in the unique four colour camouflage as all Viggens were painted from the late 1970s.
- An SK 37E Viggen (s/n 37808) with the code F 21-71 is preserved at the Musée de l’air et de l’espace located at the former Paris–Le Bourget Airport in France.
- A JA 37 Viggen (sn: 37429) with the code F 4-29 is preserved at the Estonian Aviation Museum near Tartu, Estonia. The aircraft was obtained from Swedish Air Force Museum, and flew from Sweden to Tartu in 2004.
- An AJSF 37 Viggen (s/n 37954) with the code F 21-54 is on display at the Polish Aviation Museum in Kraków.
- Two Viggens as well as the nose parts of some JA-37s can be found at the Aeroseum near Gothenburg. An AJ-37 (s/n 37094) with the code F 10-57 and an AJSH-37 (s/n 37911) with the code F 21-55.
- Two Viggens can be found at Söderhamn Aviation Museum at the former F 15 wing in Söderhamn, Sweden. One is an AJS 37 (s/n 37009) with the code F 15-09 and the other is an SK 37E trainer aircraft (s/n 37805) with the code F 15-65. The cockpit of an AJS 37 (s/n 37061) with code F 15 has been converted into a simulator that is open to the public.
- An AJ 37 Viggen is on display at the Västerås Aviation Museum in Västerås, Sweden.
- An AJS 37 Viggen is on display at the Swedish Airforce Museum in Linköping, Sweden.
- An AJSH 37 Viggen (s/n 373918) is on display at Newark Air Museum, Newark, Nottinghamshire, UK.
- The front section of an SF 37 Viggen is on display at the Swedish Aerial Reconnaissance Museum located at the old F 11 wing in Nyköping, Sweden.
- An AJSF 37 Viggen is on display at Prague Aviation Museum, Kbely, Czech Republic. s/n 37957 c/n 56–21.
- An AJSH 37 Viggen (s/n 37901) is on display at the Aviodrome museum at Lelystad Airport in the Netherlands.
- An AJSF 37 Viggen (s/n 374974) is on display at the Flugausstellung Hermeskeil museum in Hermeskeil, Germany.
- Five Ja 37 Viggens, of which one is JA37Di standard preserved at Jämtlands Flyg och Lottamuseum, Jämtland, Sweden.
- One AJ 37 Viggen preserved at Jämtlands Flyg och Lottamuseum, Jämtland, Sweden.
- Front half of one AJS 37 Viggen preserved at Jämtlands Flyg och Lottamuseum, Jämtland, Sweden.
- One SK 37 Viggen preserved at Jämtlands Flyg och Lottamuseum, Jämtland, Sweden.
- One AJ 37 Viggen is on display in Luleå, Norrbotten, Sweden.
- One AJS 37 Viggen (s/n 37074) is on display at the Museum of Aeronautics and Astronautics (Madrid) museum in Madrid, Cuatro Vientos, Spain.
- One AJS 37 Viggen (s/n 37027) and Sk37 Viggen (s/n 37800) is on display outside the Stenbäck flygmuseum outside of Skurup, Skåne, Sweden. The AJS37 being the last one flown at the F10 Scanian Air wing, it was painted Red with Division markings on the sides and ghosts on the wings. And the SK37 was the first SK37 built and came from the Försök Centralen (Testing Center) Based At F3 Air wing At Linköping, Sweden.

== Specifications (JA 37 Viggen) ==
Saab JA 37 Viggen 3-view drawings

Data from Combat Aircraft since 1945

General characteristics

- Crew: 1
- Length: 16.4 m (53 ft 10 in)
- Wingspan: 10.6 m (34 ft 9 in)
- Height: 5.9 m (19 ft 4 in)
- Wing area: 46 m^{2} (500 sq ft)
- Empty weight: 9,500 kg (20,944 lb)
- Gross weight: 16,439 kg (36,242 lb) (AJ37 17,000 kg (37,479 lb))
- Max takeoff weight: 19,274 kg (42,492 lb)
- Powerplant: 1 × Volvo RM8B afterburning turbofan, 72.1 kN (16,200 lbf) thrust dry, 125 kN (28,000 lbf) with afterburner

Performance

- Maximum speed: 2,231 km/h (1,386 mph, 1,205 kn) at 36,100 ft (11,003 m)
- Maximum speed: Mach 2.1
- Ferry range: 1,820 km (1,130 mi, 980 nmi) internal fuel only
- Service ceiling: 18,000 m (59,000 ft)
- Rate of climb: 203 m/s (40,000 ft/min)

Armament

- Guns: 1 × 30 mm Oerlikon KCA cannon with 125 rounds
- Hardpoints: 9 (three hardpoints under fuselage and three under each wing) with a capacity of 7,000 kg (15,000 lb), with provisions to carry combinations of:
  - Missiles:
    - 4 x RB99 AMRAAM (JA 37D),
    - 2 x RB71 Skyflash (only JA37),
    - 6 x AIM-9 Sidewinder
    - 4 rocket pods (135 mm, 5.4 in).
    - U95 ECM pod (JA 37D)
    - 2 x RB 04
    - 2 x RBS 15
    - 2 x Rb 05

== See also ==
- Saab 9-3 Viggen automobile

Aircraft of comparable role, configuration, and era

- Dassault Mirage F1
- McDonnell Douglas F-4 Phantom II
- Mikoyan-Gurevich MiG-23
- Mikoyan MiG-27
- SEPECAT Jaguar
- Shenyang J-8
- Vought XF8U-3 Crusader III

Related lists

- List of fighter aircraft
- List of military aircraft of Sweden

== Notes ==
=== Bibliography ===
- Andersson, Hans G. (1989). Saab Aircraft Since 1937. Smithsonian Institution Press. ISBN 0-8747-4314-1.
- Bitzinger, Richard (1991). Facing the Future: The Swedish Air Force, 1990–2005. Rand Corporation. ISBN 0-8330-1103-0.
- Boyne, Walter J. (2002). Air Warfare: An International Encyclopedia, Volume 1. ABC-CLIO. ISBN 1-5760-7345-9.
- Chant, Christopher (2014). A Compendium of Armaments and Military Hardware. London: Routledge. ISBN 1-1346-4668-2.
- Coombes, L.F.E. (2005). Control in the Sky – The Evolution and History of the Aircraft Cockpit. Barnsley, South Yorkshire, UK: Pen and Sword Books/Leo Cooper. ISBN 1-84415-148-4.
- Coram, Robert (2002). Boyd: The Fighter Pilot Who Changed the Art of War. New York: Little, Brown, and Co. ISBN 0-316-88146-5.
- Crickmore, Paul F. (2004). Lockheed Blackbird: Beyond the Secret Missions. Oxford, UK: Osprey Publishing. ISBN 1-84176-694-1.
- Donald, David; Lake, Jon, eds. (1996). Encyclopedia of World Military Aircraft (single volume ed.). London: Aerospace Publishing. ISBN 1-874023-95-6.
- Eliasson, Gunnar (2010). Advanced Public Procurement as Industrial Policy: The Aircraft Industry as a Technical University. Springer Science & Business Media. ISBN 1-4419-5849-5.
- Field, Hughes (30 May 1974). "Saab Viggen: In The Air". Flight International. pp. 707–712.
- Ford, T.E. (11 October 1973). "The Viggen in Service". Flight International. pp. 616–619.
- Fredriksen, John C. (2001). International Warbirds: An Illustrated Guide to World Military Aircraft, 1914–2000. ABC-CLIO. ISBN 1-5760-7364-5.
- Speciell Förarinstruktion FPL JA37 (A/C JA37 Flight Manual). Sweden: Försvarets Materielverk. 1983. M5800-370051.
- Erichs, Rolph (1988). The Saab-Scania Story. Stockholm: Streiffert & Co. ISBN 91-7886-014-8.
- Forsberg, Randall (1994), The Arms Production Dilemma: Contraction and Restraint in the World Combat Aircraft Industry, MIT Press, ISBN 0-2625-6085-2.
- Gunston, William ‘Bill’; Spick, Michael ‘Mike’ (1983), Modern Air Combat: The Aircraft, Tactics and Weapons Employed in Aerial Warfare Today, New York: Crescent Books, ISBN 0-517-41265-9.
- ———; ——— (1998), Moderne Kampfflugzeuge. Technik, Taktik und Bewaffnung [Modern combat aircraft. Technique, tactics and armament] (in German), Tyskland, DE: Stocker-Schmid, ISBN 978-3-7276-7062-6.
- ———; ——— (2001), Moderne Kampfflugzeuge [Modern combat aircraft] (in German), Tyskland, DE: Stocker-Schmid, ISBN 978-3-613-01926-3.
- ———; Gilchrist, Peter (1993), Jet Bombers: From the Messerschmitt Me 262 to the Stealth B-2, Osprey, ISBN 1-85532-258-7.
- Hewson, Robert (Autumn 1995). "Briefing: Saab AJS 37 Viggen: The Flygvapen's new 'Thunderbolt'". World Air Power Journal. Vol. 22. London: Aerospace Publishing. pp. 30–31. ISBN 1-874023-62-X. ISSN 0959-7050.
- Larsson, Bengt; Letell, Martin; Thörn, Håkan (2012). Transformations of the Swedish Welfare State: From Social Engineering to Governance?. Springer. ISBN 0-2303-6395-4.
- Jackson, Paul (Summer 1993). "Saab 37 Viggen". World Air Power Journal. Vol. 13. London: Aerospace Publishing. pp. 46–89. ISBN 1-874023-17-4.
- Nativi, Andrea (June 1993). "Viggen, Il Caccia Venuto dal Freddo [Viggen, The Hunting Came from the Cold]". RID magazine (in Italian). pp. 20–36.
- Peacock, Lindsay (1997). On Falcon Wings: The F-16 Story. RAF Fairford, United Kingdom: The Royal Air Force Benevolent Fund Enterprises. ISBN 1-899808-01-9.
- Roskam, Jan (2002). Airplane Design: Layout Design of Cockpit, Fuselage, Wing and Empennage : Cutaways and Inboard Profiles. DARcorporation. ISBN 1-8848-8556-X.
- Smith, Chris (1994). India's Ad Hoc Arsenal: Direction Or Drift in Defence Policy?. Oxford University Press. ISBN 0-1982-9168-X.
- Snyder, William P.; Brown, James (1997). Defense Policy in the Reagan Administration. DIANE Publishing. ISBN 0-7881-4146-5.
- Taylor, John W.R. (1981). "SAAB 37 Viggen (Thunderbolt)". Jane's All the World's Aircraft 1980–81. London: Jane's. ISBN 0-531-03953-6.
- Taylor, John W.R., ed. (1988). Jane's All the World's Aircraft, 1988–1989. London: Jane's. ISBN 0-7106-0867-5.
- This Happens in the Swedish Air Force (brochure). Stockholm: Information Department of the Air Staff, Flygstabens informationsavdelning, Swedish Air Force. 1983.
- Wagner, Paul J. (2009). Air Force Tac Recce Aircraft: NATO and Non-aligned Western European Air Force Tactical Reconnaissance Aircraft of the Cold War. Dorrance Publishing. ISBN 1-4349-9458-9.
- Warwick, Graham (27 September 1980). "Interceptor Viggen". Flight International. pp. 1260–65. Archived from the original on 13 March 2016.
- Williams, Antony G.; Gustin, Emmanuel (2004). Flying Guns, The Modern Era. Marlborough, Wiltshire, UK: The Crowood Press. ISBN 1-86126-655-3.
- Wilson, Stewart (2000). Combat Aircraft since 1945. Fyshwick, AU: Aerospace Publications. ISBN 1-875671-50-1.
- Winchester, Jim, ed. (2006). "Military Aircraft of the Cold War (The Aviation Factfile)". Saab AJ/SF/SH Viggen. London: Grange Books. ISBN 1-84013-929-3.
