= Volvo RM8 =

Low-bypass afterburning turbofan jet engine

RM8
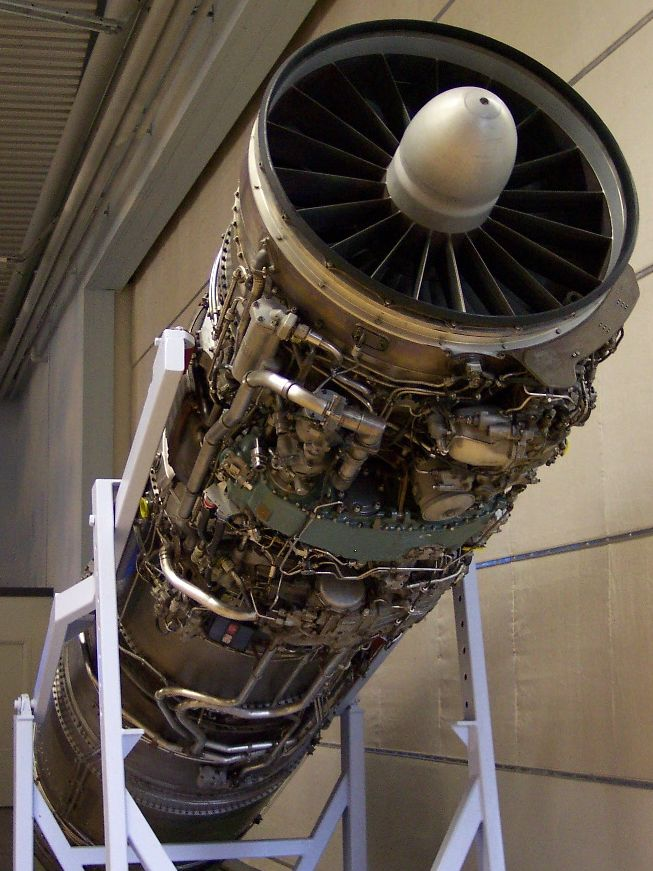
- An RM8 on display at the Swedish Air Force Museum
- Type: Turbofan
- National origin: United States/Sweden
- Manufacturer: Volvo Flygmotor/Pratt & Whitney
- First run: 1964
- Major applications: Saab 37 Viggen
- Developed from: Pratt & Whitney JT8D

The Volvo RM8 is a low-bypass afterburning turbofan jet engine developed for the Saab 37 Viggen fighter. An augmented bypass engine was required to give both better fuel consumption at cruise speeds and higher thrust boosting for its short take-off requirement than would be possible using a turbojet. In 1962, the civil Pratt & Whitney JT8D engine, as used for airliners such as the Boeing 727, was chosen as the only engine available which could be modified to meet the Viggen requirements. The RM8 was a licensed-built version of the JT8D, but extensively modified for supersonic speeds, with a Swedish-designed afterburner, and was produced by Svenska Flygmotor (later known as Volvo Aero).

== Variants and applications ==
- RM8A - AJ 37 Viggen

Since the original civil engine was designed for subsonic speeds, parts had to be thickened and made from improved materials for the higher pressures and temperatures which occur in a Mach 2 military engine. These are higher than in a Mach 2 civil airliner because supersonic combat aircraft go faster at sea level. Here the ambient temperature and pressure are higher than at altitudes where civil airliners are accelerating through the speed of sound. The Viggen was designed with a maximum speed at sea level of Mach 1.2. As an example of a required material change the diffuser case, where the compressed air is slowed for entry to the flame tubes, was changed from steel to nickel alloy to withstand the higher temperatures leaving the compressor. Air cooling for the HP turbine blades was introduced as the turbine entry temperature was 110 degC higher than on the civil engine. Hamilton Standard had supplied the fuel control for the JT8D but Bendix was chosen for the engine and afterburner fuel control systems due to their experience developing the fuel controls for another augmented turbofan engine, the Pratt & Whitney TF30. RM8 thrust boosting of 76% at take-off was much higher than possible with a turbojet. In comparison the Saab 35 Draken with a Rolls-Royce Avon turbojet engine and Swedish-developed afterburner had a thrust boost at take-off of 38%. For short landings the engine exhaust was deflected partially forwards by an airframe-mounted reverser. The exhaust passed through three slots (which otherwise supply ambient air to the airframe-mounted exhaust ejector) to give a braking force about 60% of the maximum dry take-off thrust. In comparison the braking force with the reverser design used on the JT8D engine installation on the McDonnell Douglas DC-9 airliner was 40/45% of take-off thrust.

- RM8B - JA 37 Viggen

The flight envelope for the fighter-version demanded both more thrust and better stall margins at high altitudes. This led to redesigns for the fan, the low-pressure compressor and the combustion-chambers with four injectors in each for more complete fuel mixing.

== Specifications (RM8B) ==
Data from Flight International.

==== General characteristics ====
- Type: Afterburning turbofan
- Length: 6.23 m (245 in)
- Diameter: 1.03 m (40.55 in)
- Dry weight: 2,350 kg (5,180 lb)

==== Components ====
- Compressor: Axial flow, 3-stage fan, 3-stage LP, 7-stage HP
- Combustors: 9 chambers in can-annular arrangement, four injectors per chamber

==== Performance ====
- Maximum thrust: 72.2 kN (16,200 lbf) dry, 125 kN (28,100 lbf) wet
- Overall pressure ratio: 16.5:1
- Bypass ratio: 0.97:1
- Turbine inlet temperature: 1,120°C (RM8A)
- Specific fuel consumption: 65 kg/(kN h) (0.64 lb/(lbf h)) dry, 257 kg/(kN h) (2.52 lb/(lbf h)) wet
- Thrust-to-weight ratio: 5.4

== See also ==
Related development

- Pratt & Whitney J52
- Pratt & Whitney JT8D

Related lists

- List of aircraft engines
