= Rolls-Royce Medway =

Medway
- Rolls-Royce Medway with switch-in thrust deflector
- Type: Turbofan
- Manufacturer: Rolls-Royce Limited
- First run: November 1959
- Major applications: Armstrong Whitworth AW.681
- Number built: 9

The Rolls-Royce RB.141 Medway was a large low-bypass turbofan engine designed, manufactured and tested in prototype form by Rolls-Royce in the early-1960s. The project was cancelled due to changes in market requirements that also led to the development and production of the smaller but similar Rolls-Royce Spey, and the cancellation of the Armstrong Whitworth AW.681 military transport aircraft project.

== Design and development ==
Designed by a team led by Alan Arnold Griffith, the RB.141 was originally designed to meet a new propulsion requirement for the de Havilland DH.121 airliner project which later became the Hawker Siddeley Trident. The engine was later named after the River Medway in line with Rolls-Royce company tradition for jet engines. The DH.121 itself was being designed to a requirement and specification from British European Airways issued in February 1958, and when this requirement was altered to that of a smaller aircraft, the Medway in its initial form was no longer needed.

As a considerable amount of company funds had already been spent on development, the project was continued to rework the design for another future aircraft project, the Armstrong Whitworth AW.681 VTOL military transport aircraft. The rear section of the engine was modified to incorporate an internal thrust deflector to duct exhaust gases through swivelling nozzles; an idea similar to that used on the contemporary Bristol Siddeley Pegasus. Cancellation of the AW.681 project however also brought to an end further development work on the Medway with attention turning to the smaller, but very closely related, Spey turbofan, the Spey being basically a scaled-down Medway incorporating more recent technical developments.

Another possible application for the Medway was the Saab 37 Viggen, but a lack of British government funding was stated as the reason for the cancellation of this order.

By December 1963 the Medway had successfully completed over 1,700 hours of bench running.

== Variants ==
RB.140

- 8,000 lbf (36 kN) thrust, early development engine

RB.141 Medway

- Variant for DH.121 airliner use

RB.142 Medway

- Vectored thrust development for the AW.681.

RB.174 Medway

- Advanced civil development

RB.177 Medway

- Advanced military development of ~15,000 lb st dry, proposed for the Saab 37 Viggen

== Projected applications ==
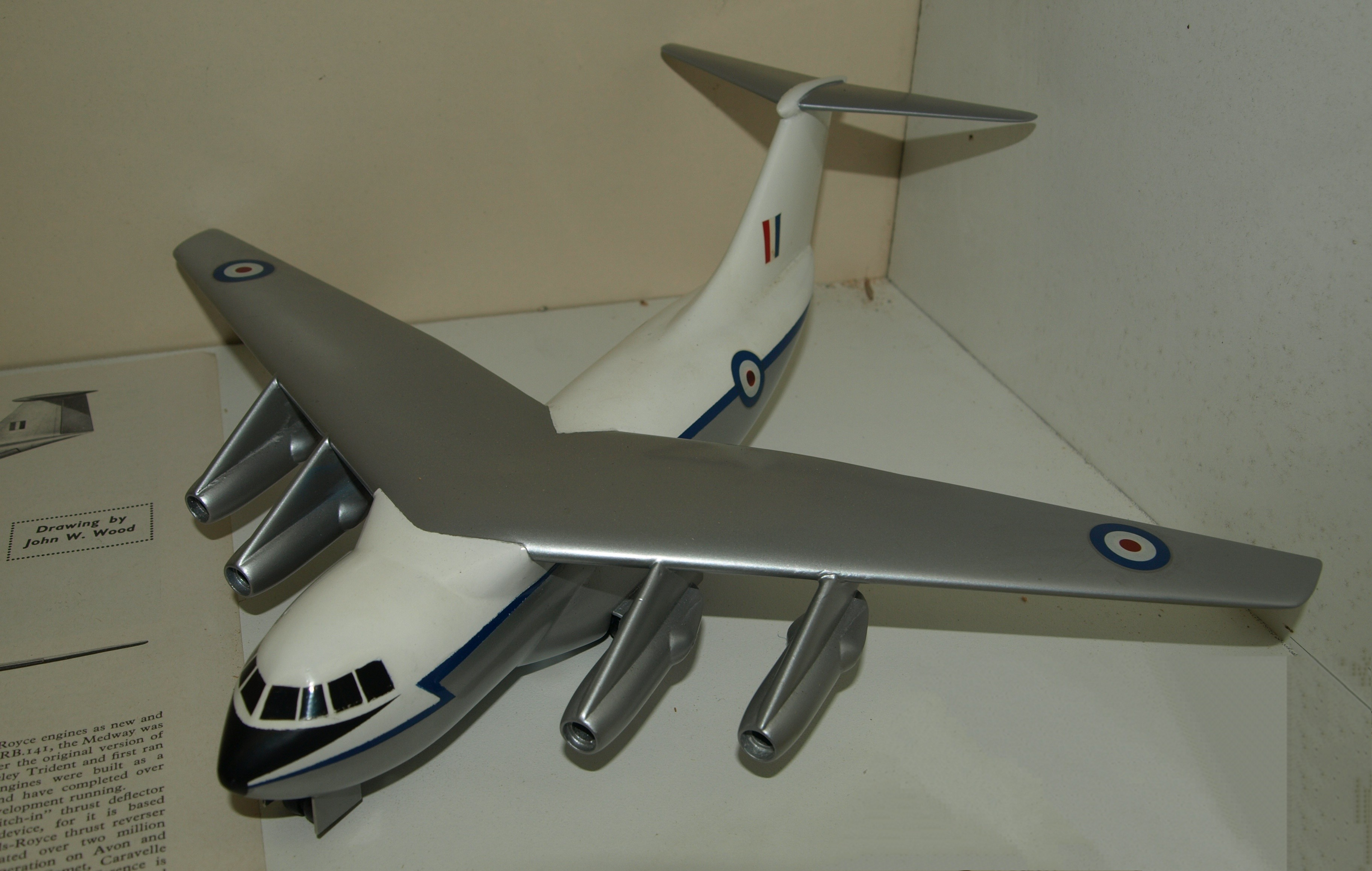
The Medway powered AW.681

- Armstrong Whitworth AW.681
- Bristol Type 200
- de Havilland DH.121
- Saab 37 Viggen
- Sud Aviation Super Caravelle
- Vickers VC10

== Specifications (RB.141-3 Medway) ==
Data from Aircraft engines of the World 1964/65.,

==== General characteristics ====
- Type: Low bypass twin-spool turbofan with vectored thrust hot exhaust
- Length: 165 in (4,200 mm)
- Diameter: 42 in (1,100 mm)
- Dry weight: 3,500 lb (1,600 kg)

==== Components ====
- Compressor: Axial, 6-stage LP fan, 11-stage HP
- Combustors: Cannular, 10 chambers
- Turbine: 2-stage LP, 2-stage HP
- Fuel type: Jet fuel
- Oil system: Return system at 50 psi (3.4 bar)

==== Performance ====
- Maximum thrust:

Take-off: 77 kN (17,300 lbf)
Max Continuous: 71 kN (16,000 lbf)

- Overall pressure ratio: 16.75:1
- Specific fuel consumption: 0.6 lb/lbf/h (61 kg/kN/h)
- Oil Consumption: 1.2 lb/h (0.54 kg/h)
- Thrust-to-weight ratio: 4.94

== See also ==
Related development

- Rolls-Royce Spey

Related lists

- List of aircraft engines
