= Armstrong Whitworth AW.681 =

1960s British military transport aircraft design study

AW.681 / HS.681
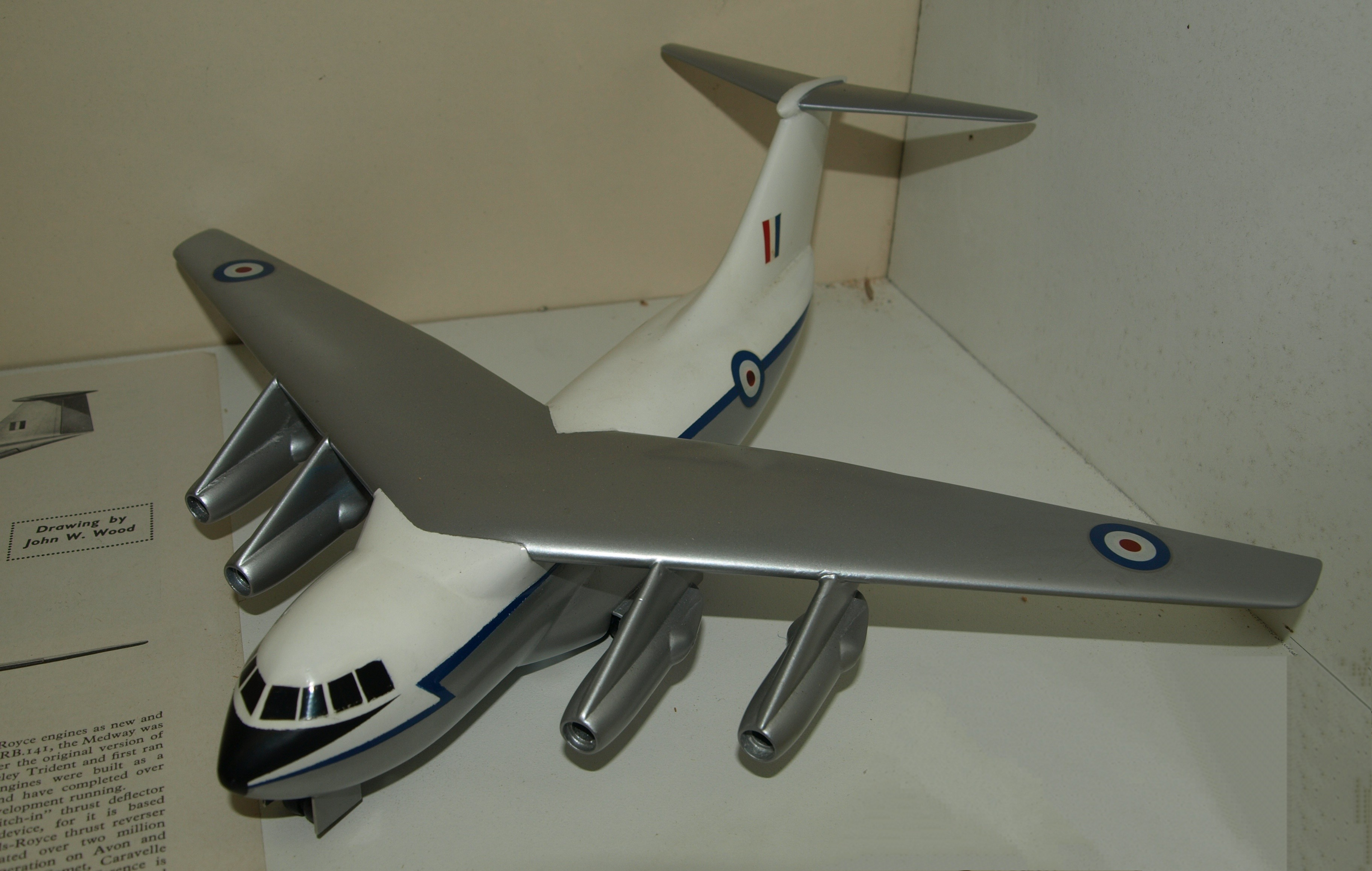
- Manufacturer's model of the AW.681

General information
- Type: Projected STOL Military transport
- Manufacturer: Hawker Siddeley
- Status: Project cancelled in February 1965
- Primary user: Royal Air Force (intended)

History
- Manufactured: None

The Armstrong Whitworth AW.681, also known as the Whitworth Gloster 681 or Hawker Siddeley HS.681, was a projected British long-range STOL military transport aircraft design of the early 1960s. Developed by manufacturer Armstrong Whitworth Aircraft, it was intended to be capable of achieving both Short Takeoff and Landing (STOL) and Vertical Takeoff and Landing (VTOL) performance.

The AW.681 was designed to satisfy the performance specification of Operational Requirement 351, which had been heavily influenced by the NATO specification NBMR-4. Both Armstrong Whitworth and the British Aircraft Corporation vigorously competed to be awarded the contract, as well as engine manufacturing Bristol-Siddeley and Rolls-Royce Ltd to power it. Both submissions had to be revised heavily following an update to the Requirement that added VTOL performance. Armstrong Whitworth's AW.681 submission emerged as the favoured option for selection.

On 5 March 1962, Armstrong Whitworth received UK Government authorisation to proceed with a detailed project study and the construction of a prototype, which was projected to fly around 1966. However, following a change in government, during February 1965, the cancellation of the HS.681 programme was announced. Despite efforts to cheapen the design by Armstrong Whitworth, culminating in the HS.802 proposal, there was no reversal of this decision. Following the AW.681's termination, it was decided to purchase the American-built Lockheed Hercules as an off-the-shelf means of fulfilling the RAF's transport requirements instead.

== Development ==
=== Background ===
By 1960, several major British programmes in the field of military transport aircraft had been terminated or curtailed, such as the Short Belfast and the Vickers V-1000; according to author Derek Wood, these outcomes had been largely due to a lack of meaningful support from their principal customer, the Royal Air Force (RAF). One promising opportunity remaining was Operational Requirement 351, for a capable medium-range freighter to replace the Blackburn Beverley and Handley Page Hastings piston-engine aircraft in service with the RAF. Officials within the service had shaped the specified performance criteria of this requirement; the aircraft was to possess Short Takeoff and Landing (STOL) capabilities, which it was to perform while carrying a minimum payload of 35,000 pounds (15,900 kg).

Proposals were received from various manufacturers. The British Aircraft Corporation (BAC) decided to offer two designs; the BAC.222, which was a local development of the American Lockheed Hercules, and the indigenously developed BAC.208, which would have been furnished with deflected-thrust engines and multiple lift fans. According to Wood, the BAC.222 proposal had good long-term production prospects and represented an excellent solution to the requirement; he also noted that Lockheed and BAC aggressively lobbied for its construction.

Armstrong Whitworth, which was by then a constituent of Hawker Siddeley Aviation, submitted a design, the AW.681. The company had chosen to adopt the Rolls-Royce RB.142 Medway, a turbofan engine being developed, to power the type; according to Wood, Armstrong Whitworth viewed the engine as a suitable basis for a broader programme covering both civil and military markets.

=== Selection ===
There was a lengthy interval between the submissions and the British government making decisions regarding the requirement. Wood observed that there was considerable pressure within the British aircraft industry for an indigenously developed design to be favoured, which had perhaps dissuaded the government from opting for a collaborative programme with the Americans, despite explorations of such arrangements.

A second issue of the requirement called for the presence of four deflected thrust engines, which were to be suitably augmented by several lift engines housed underneath the wings to allow the aircraft to achieve a viable Vertical Takeoff and Landing (VTOL) capability. Armstrong Whitworth issued revisions of their AW.681 proposal to accommodate this new need; these revised submissions incorporated vectored thrust nozzles and boundary layer control (BLC) amongst other features; there was also considerable interest in adopting the Rolls-Royce Pegasus engine. BAC also revised their designs in line with the requirement change, although Wood notes that Armstrong Whitworth had already emerged as the front runner for selection around this time.

Following a competitive evaluation of the submissions, the AW.681 proposal was selected for further development. On 5 March 1962, Julian Amery, the Aviation Minister, announced that the Government had authorised the go-ahead for the HS.681 and that, in addition to a detailed project study being conducted, a prototype of the aircraft was projected to perform its maiden flight during 1966. Around this time, it was anticipated that 50 aircraft would be ordered. Arrangements were also made for around 20 per cent of the production work to be sub-contracted to Short Brothers in Belfast, Northern Ireland.

=== Termination ===
During 1964, following the formation of a new government dominated by the Labour Party, a review of large military programmes was announced. During February 1965, the cancellation of the HS.681 programme was announced by the government; in its place, it would procure the American-built Lockheed Hercules instead.

Armstrong Whitworth pursued a last-minute effort, promoting the development of a non-STOL version of the HS.681, designated the HS.802. To achieve lower costs, this proposal would have had the same wings and engines as had been used on the HS.801 Nimrod maritime patrol aircraft. Wood notes that the redesign, while likely being cheaper, came at the sacrifice of the type's STOL capabilities.

Despite lobbying, the HS.802 failed to secure any commitments, making development untenable; Armstrong Whitworth shelved the project and the Armstrong Whitworth factory in Coventry was closed, resulting in the loss of 5,000 jobs. Wood critiqued the programme and its cancellation, attributing some responsibility to overly-ambitious requirements of the RAF that had pushed the limit of aircraft capabilities, as well as the failure to settle those requirements.

== Design ==
In its basic configuration, the AW.681 was a monoplane with a circular cross-section fuselage, featuring a swept shoulder-mounted wing and a high T-tail. The rear fuselage was upswept, accommodating both sizable clamshell loading doors and a ramp; further egress was to have been provided by several side-mounted fore-and-aft cabin doors. In the configuration proposed for the RAF, the AW.681 would have been able to accommodate a maximum load of 60 paratroops. The retractable main undercarriage was accommodated within large bulges on the lower sides of the fuselage.

The AW.681 was to have been powered by an arrangement of four Rolls-Royce RB.142 Medway turbofan engines; these would have been combined with a series of vectored thrust nozzles mounted upon pylons underneath the wings. The selection of the powerplant was subject to a considerable fight between engine manufacturers Rolls-Royce and Bristol-Siddeley. Ultimately, Armstrong Whitworth opted for the RB.174-11 model of the Medway, which was projected to generate a maximum thrust of 13,800lb, although more powerful models would have attained around 20,000lb according to Rolls-Royce. For improved STOL/VTOL performance, deflectors were to be installed around the engines.

As designed, the AW.681 was set to feature boundary layer control (BLC), which would have used blown flaps mounted upon the leading edges of the wing; the ailerons, flaps, and slats would all have been operated using blown air. The combination of BLC and thrust vectoring would have provided the AW.681 with a high degree of STOL performance, which could be achieved exclusively using its Medway engines. To achieve further performance gains, the use of both water injection and reheat were proposed options.

One proposed variant of the AW.681 would have been capable of VTOL performance, albeit requiring extensive alterations in order to achieve this. In one configuration, it would have been powered by an additional eighteen 6,000 pounds-force (27,000 N) RB.162-64 lift engines in addition to its four Medway engines. Alternatively, the Medway engines could have been replaced by four Bristol Siddeley Pegasus ducted-flow turbofan engines, the same power plant as used on the Harrier jump jet. The specific version of the Pegasus projected for use was 5 or 6, which would have been rated at around 18,000 pounds-force (80,000 N). Both approaches were proposed as being capable of obtaining a realistic VTOL capability.

== Specifications (proposed STOL) ==
Data from Armstrong Whitworth Aircraft since 1913

General characteristics

- Capacity: 35,000 lb (16,000 kg)
- Length: 104 ft 2 in (31.75 m)
- Wingspan: 134 ft 0 in (40.84 m)
- Height: 37 ft 10 in (11.53 m)
- Wing area: 2,250 sq ft (209 m^{2})
- Gross weight: 181,200 lb (82,191 kg)
- Powerplant: 4 × Rolls-Royce Medway turbofans with thrust deflection, 13,790 lbf (61.3 kN) thrust each

Performanceabove 25,000 ft (7,600 m)

- Maximum speed: Mach 0.71
- Range: 4,800 mi (7,700 km, 4,200 nmi)

== See also ==
Aircraft of comparable role, configuration, and era

- Boeing YC-14
- Dornier Do 31
- McDonnell Douglas YC-15

Related lists

- List of VTOL aircraft
