= Fighter Mafia =

American military advocacy group

The Fighter Mafia was a controversial group of United States Air Force officers and civilian defense analysts who, in the 1960s and 1970s, advocated for fighter design criteria in opposition to those of the design boards of the time, and the use of John Boyd and Thomas P. Christie's energy-maneuverability (E-M) theory in designing fighter aircraft. The Mafia influenced the specifications for the F-X Program and went on to independently develop specifications for the Light Weight Fighter (LWF). Mafia associate Harry Hillaker designed the purely air superiority day fighter prototype YF-16, which won the LWF contest but then turned into the multi-role F-16 Fighting Falcon. The group's nickname, a professional jest coined by Everest Riccioni, an Air Force member of Italian heritage, was a rejoinder to the "Bomber Mafia".

== History ==
In the 1960s, both the U.S. Air Force and U.S. Navy were in the process of acquiring large, heavy fighters designed primarily to fight with air-to-air missiles. Project Forecast, a 1963 Air Force attempt to identify future weapons trends, stated that a counter-air defense must be able to destroy aircraft at long ranges using advanced weapon systems. The Air Force felt that these needs would be filled for the next twenty years by missile-armed variants of the F-111 Aardvark and F-4 Phantom II with no gun.

Boyd's work with energy–maneuverability theory (E-M) modeling, enabling quantitative comparison of the performance of aircraft in terms of air combat maneuvering in the context of dogfighting, demonstrated that the F-111 would be poorly suited to the role of fighter. The Air Force F-X proposal was quietly rewritten to reflect his findings, dropping a heavy swing-wing from the design, lowering the gross weight from 60,000+ pounds to slightly below 40,000, and decreasing the top speed from Mach 2.7 to 2.3–2.5. The result was the F-15 Eagle, an aircraft that was far superior in maneuverability to the F-111 fighter variants. The Air Force had also been studying a lighter day fighter. Starting in 1965, the Air Force had pursued a low-priority study of the Advanced Day Fighter (ADF), a 25,000-pound design. After they learned of the MiG-25 in 1967, the ADF was dropped in order to urgently focus work on the F-15. The F-15, originally a lighter aircraft, grew in size and weight as it attempted to match the inflated performance estimates of the MiG-25. While Boyd's contributions to the F-15 were significant, he felt that it was still a compromise.

Boyd, defense analysts Jacob Ramirez, Tom Christie, Matt Gorr, Reno Kneevers, and Chuck Myers, test pilot Col. Everest Riccioni and aeronautical engineer Harry Hillaker formed the core of the "Fighter Mafia" which worked behind the scenes in the late 1960s to pursue a lightweight fighter as an alternative to the F-15. The group strongly believed that an ideal fighter should not include any of the radar-guided missile systems, active radar or rudimentary ground-attack capability that found their way into the F-15. Riccioni coined the nickname, a joke on his Italian heritage that harkened back to the "Bomber Mafia", theorists at the Air Corps Tactical School in the 1930s whose ideas led to the primacy of heavy bomber aircraft performing strategic bombing over that of fighter (whose acolytes still occupied the upper command positions of the Air Force), and dubbed himself the "godfather". Their assertions included:

- Contemporary Air Force generals established poor criteria for combat effectiveness that ignored historical combat data.
- Design focus on high technology and planes that could go "higher, faster, and farther" increased costs and decreased effectiveness. The group's view was that cheaper designs would have been more effective.
- The bureaucracy of the Air Force was corrupt, allegedly dishonestly testing weapons before buying them and deploying them in the field.
- The focus of the USAF should have been on close air support and the use of combined arms to support maneuver warfare rather than air interdiction.
- Multi-role and multi-mission capability plane designs were fundamentally compromised compared to specialized designs.
- Beyond-visual range combat was impossible.

In 1969, under the guise that the Navy was developing a small, high-performance Navy aircraft, Riccioni won $149,000 to fund the "Study to Validate the Integration of Advanced Energy-Maneuverability Theory with Trade-Off Analysis". This money was split between Northrop and General Dynamics to build the embodiment of Boyd's E-M theory – a small, low-drag, low-weight, pure air-to-air fighter with no bomb racks. Northrop demanded and received $100,000 to design the YF-17; General Dynamics, eager to redeem its debacle with the F-111, received the remainder to develop Hillaker's own YF-16. In the summer of 1971, deputy defense secretary David Packard announced a budget of $200 million to be spent on prototypes from all the services branches. Defense Secretary Melvin Laird and his deputy David Packard had entered office with the Nixon administration in 1969 and were tasked with whipping the military purchasing system into shape. This was in response to Senator William Proxmire issuing reports critical of the high costs of the F-15 and F-14. Packard was interested in the idea of prototyping weapons before sending them into production, given issues stemming from McNamara's "Total Package Procurement Concept" where analysis and quantification was done on paper. The 1972 fiscal year budget assigned $12 million for Lightweight Fighter prototypes. On January 6, 1971, an RFP was issued to industry for a 20,000-pound fighter to complement the F-15.

== Legacy ==
As the Fighter Mafia attracted considerable controversy, the actual extent of their contribution to U.S. fighter design is a matter of debate. The F-15 was the first jet plane in the USAF's history that was designed with maneuverability specifications in mind thanks to Boyd's E-M theory.

The Fighter Mafia's preference was for an aircraft dedicated to air superiority rather than a multi-role fighter. The motto was "not a pound for air-to-ground". The Mafia promoted what they called the "Red Bird" concept, that is a design that would lower weight by stripping the plane of extraneous equipment such as active radar.

In light of the Mafia's disappointment with the F-15, the lightweight fighter was supposed to be the air-to-air superiority fighter that they wanted. Compared to the Red Bird concept, the LWF would cost even less. As the Mafia's civilian associate member Pierre Sprey argued that sneaking up on an unaware opponent was the most important criterion of a good fighter, the LWF's small size would also make it less visible to the eye. A faster supersonic cruising speed would make it more difficult for enemies to sneak up from behind. While conventional wisdom at the time considered twin engines to be safer, the F-16 challenged that view with a single-engine design. However, production F-16s lacked supercruise capability as the Air Force saddled the F-16 with multi-mission equipment, air-to-ground features, and an active radar. Whereas the prototype YF-16 "whipped" other airplanes in dogfights, the production version was less maneuverable and performed worse in air-to-air combat.

Hillaker, the F-16's chief designer, commented: "If I had realized at the time that the airplane would have been used as a multimission, primarily an air-to-surface airplane as it is used now, I would have designed it differently." Hillaker later did design a dedicated air-to-ground oriented, 17-hardpoint YF-16 derivative, dubbed the F-16XL, that also greatly outperformed both the YF-16 and the production F-16 in fields such as range and speed. However, it lost in the USAF Enhanced Tactical Fighter competition to a new F-15 model, the 15-hardpoint F-15E Strike Eagle, in part due to the latter's lower cost and twin engines.

== Criticism ==
Critics argue that the F-15 and F-16 succeeded because they moved away from the Fighter Mafia's ideas, seeing significant export success because they were multi-role aircraft with active radar homing missiles. The "Red Bird" concept designed by the Fighter Mafia included no radar, no sophisticated avionics, and was armed only with a cannon and infrared homing missiles.

Proponents of the F-35 argue that fourth-generation fighters like the F-15 and F-16 will fare poorly in a "high-threat" environment because they lack stealth technology and other advanced fifth-generation fighter features (such as sensor fusion).

The Fighter Mafia have been criticized for their lack of combat experience and aeronautical expertise. Only Boyd had brief air combat experience (in the Korean War) and did not achieve any kills as a fighter pilot. Riccioni had seen no combat before he was assigned to the Pentagon. Sprey has been characterized as "a dilettante with an engineering degree but no military experience".
