= Pierre Sprey =

American military commentator (1937–2021)

- Born: Pierre Michel Sprey; November 22, 1937; Nice, France
- Died: August 5, 2021 (aged 83); Glenn Dale, Maryland
- Education: Yale University; Cornell University
- Occupations: Defense analyst Defense contractor critic Record producer

Pierre Michel Sprey (November 22, 1937 – August 5, 2021) was an American defense analyst. Working with John Boyd and Thomas P. Christie at the Pentagon, he was associated with the self-dubbed 'Fighter Mafia', which advocated the use of energy–maneuverability theory in fighter jet design. Claims exist that Sprey was the designer or involved in the design of several military jets, including the F-16 and A-10. The factuality of these claims and potential extent of his involvement is a subject of controversy.

== Early life and education ==
Sprey was born in Nice, France, in 1937 to Jewish parents and raised in New York, U.S. Sprey was admitted to Yale University at the age of fifteen and graduated four years later with a double major in French literature and mechanical engineering. He later continued his education at Cornell University where he studied mathematical statistics and operations research. He subsequently worked at Grumman Aircraft as a consulting statistician on space and commercial transportation projects. From 1966 to 1970 he was a special assistant at the Office of the Secretary of Defense.

== Defense analyst and commentator ==
During the 1960s, at which time he worked as a statistician for the Office of the Assistant Secretary of Defense for Systems Analysis, Sprey was associated with a group of defense analysts calling themselves the "Fighter Mafia", who advocated for a lightweight fighter as an alternative to the F-15.

The Fighter Mafia strongly believed that an ideal fighter should not include any of the sophisticated radar and missile systems or rudimentary ground-attack capability that found their way into the F-15. Based on energy–maneuverability theory they advocated for a small, low-drag, low-weight, fighter with no bomb racks. The Fighter Mafia credit this concept for spurring the creation of the Lightweight Fighter program that would result in the F-16, the most produced 4th generation fighter. Though others point to the inclusion of features the fighter mafia had advocated against such as radar guided missiles, as evidence of them having a more peripheral role in its design. Sprey also became friends with Avery Kay, with whom he claimed involvement in design concepts for a large caliber ground attack aircraft that would result in the A-10. Official records show Sprey (but not Kay), attending as one of three members of the OASD (SA) group, at the 39 member meeting called to define the contract for the A-X program but not at later meetings. Marshall L. Mitchel criticizes Sprey for overemphasizing his role saying that Sprey claimed to "have written the test program for the A-X" and that such a claim was not true.

More broadly both the Fighter Mafia and their critics note the design changes made to the F-16 and A-10 as, like the F-15, the F-16 became a costlier multi-role fighter rather than the light air-to-air specialist they originally envisioned while the A-10 was equipped with the anti-tank missiles they advocated against. Sprey continued to be critical of more technologically advanced aspects of the F-16 and F-15. Despite this, his critics noted both planes saw successful combat use, and that the F-15 has a perfect air to air combat record. Sprey at times also expressed his dissatisfaction with the size and complexity of the A-10, proposing a concept he called a blitzfighter, an extremely small aircraft with a cannon and no other armaments.

Paralleling his earlier critiques of the F-15 and F-16, Sprey was a frequent critic of the F-35 Joint Strike Fighter program. He asserted the F-35 was too costly and complicated to replace the F-16 and A-10, particularly the latter's role in close air support (CAS). Sprey claimed that close air support should be the Air Force's most important mission and that the USAF has been trying to retire the A-10 for years simply because it does not want the CAS mission. Though many of his claims about modern air combat have received pushback from other commentators and air force pilots. Sprey was interviewed about his views of the F-35 multiple times: by the popular press, on the politics and policy news network C-SPAN, at a meeting of the activist group "Stop the F-35", and on Russian state media. He also appeared on a podcast hosted by Aviation Week where he debated a retired US Marine Corps combat pilot and instructor at the United States Navy Strike Fighter Tactics Instructor program ("TOPGUN") who had piloted both the F-35B and the F-22 Raptor.

== Record production ==
Sprey recorded music through his own label, Mapleshade Records, and sold high-end audiophile equipment. His recording with the Addicts Rehabilitation Center (ARC) Choir singing "Walk With Me" appears in Kanye West's 2004 hit "Jesus Walks". Sprey said he earned enough royalties from the West song "to support 30 of my money-losing jazz albums." Sprey claimed his recording techniques aimed to record in a way that physically mimicked what would be heard by a person listening in an ideal location and having little manipulation of the recorded signals.

== Death ==
Sprey died on August 5, 2021, of an apparent heart attack.
