= Patterns of Conflict =

1976 American military lecture by John Boyd

Patterns of Conflict was a presentation by Colonel John Boyd outlining his theories on modern combat and how the key to success was to upset the enemy's "observation-orientation-decision-action time cycle or loop", or OODA loop. Patterns developed the idea of a "counter-blitz", a blitzkrieg in reverse, with numerous attacks followed by withdrawals to the rear. The aim was to confuse the enemy by presenting no apparent strategy, reveal the enemy's intentions through the strength of the response, and present a misleading picture of the defender's own actions in order to disrupt the attacker's future plan of action.

First presented in 1976, Patterns grew enormously popular through the 1970s, and was re-presented on many occasions, including a personal presentation to Dick Cheney in 1981. A 1980 presentation to the US Marine Corps led to the development of an entirely new doctrinal system. Boyd's ideas also became the basis for the AirLand Battle, the US Army's European warfighting doctrine from 1982 into the late 1990s. Patterns has been widely regarded as one of the most influential works of warfighting theory of all time and has been compared to the writings of Sun Tsu. Based on Patterns and the work that followed, Boyd has been called "America's greatest military theorist".

== Description ==
=== E-M background ===
Boyd was a US Air Force colonel who had developed the energy–maneuverability theory of air combat. This was based on formulas that revealed a fighter aircraft's ability to maneuver, allowing direct comparison between different designs using simple metrics. This work became extremely influential over time, resulting in changes to the design of the F-15 Eagle, and producing the basic design parameters of the F-16 Fighting Falcon.

== Reception ==
In January 1980 Boyd gave his briefing Patterns of Conflict at the Marine Corps Amphibious Warfare School. This led to the instructor at the time, Michael Wyly, and Boyd changing the curriculum, with the blessing of General Trainor. Trainor later asked Wyly to write a new tactics manual for the Marines. John Schmitt, guided by General Alfred M. Gray, Jr. wrote Warfighting, collaborating with John Boyd during the process. Wyly, Lind, and a few other junior officers are credited with developing concepts for what would become the Marine model of maneuver warfare.

In 1981 Boyd presented Patterns to Richard Cheney, then a member of the United States House of Representatives. By 1990 Boyd had moved to Florida because of declining health, but Cheney (then the Secretary of Defense in the George H. W. Bush administration) called him back to work on the plans for Operation Desert Storm. Boyd had substantial influence on the ultimate "left hook" design of the plan.
