= John Boyd (military strategist) =

American fighter pilot and strategist

- Born: January 23, 1927; Erie, Pennsylvania, US
- Died: March 9, 1997 (aged 70); West Palm Beach, Florida, US
- Burial place: Arlington National Cemetery
- Education: University of Iowa; Georgia Institute of Technology
- Military career
- Allegiance: United States
- Branch: United States Air Force
- Service years: 1945–1975
- Rank: Colonel
- Nicknames: Forty Second Boyd; Genghis John; The Mad Major; Plum; The Ghetto Colonel
- Commands: Task Force Alpha; 56th Combat Support Group
- Conflicts: World War II; Korean War; Vietnam War
- Awards: Legion of Merit (4); Air Medal (3); Harold Brown Award
- Other work: "Aerial Attack Study"; Energy–Maneuverability theory OODA loop Military strategy

John Richard Boyd (January 23, 1927 – March 9, 1997) was a United States Air Force fighter pilot and Pentagon consultant during the second half of the 20th century. His theories have been highly influential in military, business, and litigation strategies and planning.

Boyd authored "Aerial Attack Study" (immediately classified) in 1960. As leader of the Fighter Mafia, he is claimed to have inspired the Lightweight Fighter program (LWF), which produced the General Dynamics F-16 Fighting Falcon and preceded McDonnell Douglas F/A-18 Hornet. Boyd, together with Thomas Christie, created the Energy–Maneuverability theory of aerial combat (also immediately classified), which eventually (upon declassification) became the world standard for the design of fighter aircraft. He also developed the decision cycle known as the OODA loop, the process by which an entity reacts to an event.

== Early life ==
Boyd was born on January 23, 1927, in Erie, Pennsylvania. He was one of five children born to Elsie Beyer Boyd and Hubert Boyd. Hubert was raised Catholic and Elsie was a German Presbyterian.

The family of his father, Hubert Boyd, were Ulster-Scots. The grandfather, Thomas J Boyd Sr., immigrated as a child with his parents from Ireland in 1850 bring the family to the United States during the Great Famine. The Boyd family in Ireland were predominantly descended from the Scottish Lowland Clan Boyd of Kilmarnock. They were influential Ulster-Scots settlers who migrated from Scotland to Northern Ireland in the 17th century, with notable branches establishing themselves in County Donegal and County Antrim.

Boyd enlisted in the Army Air Forces on October 30, 1944, while he was still a junior in high school. After graduation, he completed his basic training and skill training as an aircraft turret mechanic during the waning months of World War II. From January 1946 to January 1947, Boyd served as a swimming instructor in Japan. He attained the rank of sergeant, and served in the Air Force Reserve until he graduated from college. He graduated from the University of Iowa in 1951 with a bachelor's degree in economics and later earned a second bachelor's degree in industrial engineering from the Georgia Institute of Technology.

== Air Force career ==
External videos
- Booknotes interview with Robert Coram on Boyd: The Fighter Pilot Who Changed the Art of War, January 26, 2003, C-SPAN

Boyd was commissioned as a second lieutenant in the Air Force following completion of the Reserve Officers' Training Corps program at the University of Iowa. On March 27, 1953, Boyd arrived in Korea as an F-86 Sabre pilot. In the two months until the Korean War armistice on July 27, Boyd flew 22 missions in F-86 Sabres, in which he did not fire his guns or score a kill. After his service in Korea, he was invited to attend the Fighter Weapons School (FWS). Boyd attended the school and graduated at the top of his class. Upon graduation, he was invited to stay at the FWS as an instructor. He became head of the Academic Section and wrote the tactics manual for the school.

He was dubbed "Forty Second Boyd" for his standing bet as an instructor pilot that beginning from a position of disadvantage, he could defeat any opposing pilot in air combat maneuvering in less than 40 seconds. According to his biographer, Robert Coram, Boyd was also known at different points of his career as "The Mad Major" for the intensity of his passions, as "Genghis John" for his confrontational style of interpersonal discussion, as the "Sugarplum Fairy" or "Plum" for his fluid movements during his presentations, and as the "Ghetto Colonel" for his spartan lifestyle.

Boyd was brought to the Pentagon by Major General Arthur C. Agan Jr. to do mathematical analysis that would support the McDonnell Douglas F-15 Eagle program in order to pass the Office of the Secretary of Defense's systems analysis process.

During the Vietnam War, he served as Vice Commander of Task Force Alpha and as Commander of the 56th Combat Support Group at Nakhon Phanom Royal Thai Air Force Base in Thailand from April 1972 to April 1973.

== Military theories ==
=== Aerial Attack Study ===
Boyd revolutionized air-to-air combat by authoring the classified Aerial Attack Study, which in 1960 became official Air Force doctrine, the official tactics manual for fighter aircraft, the bible of air combat. Boyd changed how pilots thought; prior to his tactics manual, pilots had thought that air-to-air combat was far too complex to ever be fully understood. With the release of the Aerial Attack Study, American pilots realized that the high-stakes death dance of aerial combat was solved. With its eventual declassification, so did pilots around the world. Boyd stated that a pilot entering each aerial maneuver must know two things: the position of the enemy and the velocity of the enemy. Given the velocity of an enemy, a pilot can anticipate what the enemy can do. When a pilot understands what maneuvers the enemy can perform, he can then decide how to counter any of the other pilot's actions.

=== Energy–maneuverability theory ===
In the early 1960s, Boyd, together with Thomas P. Christie, a civilian mathematician, created the energy–maneuverability theory, or E-M theory, of aerial combat. A maverick by reputation, Boyd admitted to stealing the IBM 704 computer time to do the millions of calculations necessary to prove the theory. A civilian employee had previously barred Boyd from performing the calculations, but Christie provided Boyd a project number. An investigating inspector general commended Boyd and his computer work. E-M theory became the world standard for the design of fighter aircraft.

=== F-X project ===
With Colonel Everest Riccioni and Pierre Sprey, Boyd formed a small advocacy group within Headquarters USAF that dubbed itself the "Fighter Mafia". Riccioni was an Air Force fighter pilot assigned to a staff position in Research and Development, and Sprey was a civilian statistician working in systems analysis. The Air Force's F-X project was then floundering, but Boyd's deployment orders to Vietnam were canceled, and he was brought to the Pentagon to redo the tradeoff studies according to E-M theory. While assigned to work on the F-X, then nicknamed the Blue Bird, Boyd disagreed with the direction the program was going and proposed an alternative "Red Bird". The concept was for a clear-weather air-to-air-only fighter with a top speed of Mach 1.6, rather than the Blue Bird's Mach 2.5+. The top speed would be sacrificed for lower weight (and therefore better maneuverability and lower cost). Both Boyd and Sprey also argued against an active radar and radar-guided missiles, and they proposed the concept to Air Staff. The proposal went unheeded. Boyd's work did help save the project from being a costly dud even though its final product, the McDonnell Douglas F-15 Eagle, was larger and heavier than he had desired.

=== LWF project ===
The Secretary of Defense, attracted by the idea of a low cost fighter, gave funding to Riccioni for a study project on the Lightweight Fighter program (LWF), which became the F-16. Both the Department of Defense and the Air Force went ahead with the program and stipulated a "design to cost" basis no more than $3 million per copy over 300 aircraft. The USAF considered the idea of a "hi-lo" mix force structure and expanded the LWF program. The program soon went against the Fighter Mafia's vision since it was not the stripped-down air-to-air specialist that they had envisioned but a heavier multi-role fighter-bomber with advanced avionics, an active radar, and radar-guided missiles. Harry Hillaker, an F-16 designer, remarked that he would have designed the plane differently if he had known that it would become a multi mission aircraft.

=== OODA loop ===
The OODA loop

Based on his experiences in Thailand during the Vietnam War, Boyd conjectured that that the attrition-firepower model of warfare (prevalent since the Industrial Revolution) would become less important in future conflicts, and the ability to rapidly and accurately acquire and act on information would grow in importance. In the early 1970s, he developed these observations into a key concept called the OODA loop (Observe, Orient, Decide, Act, repeat), a decision making cycle that provided an entity (either an individual or an organization) with foreseeable and planned responses to external events. The OODA loop has since been used as the core for a theory of litigation strategy that unifies the use of cognitive science and game theory to shape the actions of witnesses and opposing counsel.

=== Maneuver warfare and Marines ===
In January 1980 Boyd gave his briefing Patterns of Conflict at the US Marines AWS (Amphibious Warfare School), which led to the instructor, Michael Wyly, and Boyd changing the curriculum. That was with the blessing of General Trainor, who later asked Wyly to write a new tactics manual for the Marines.

Wyly, along with Pierre Sprey, Raymond J. "Ray" Leopold, Franklin "Chuck" Spinney, Jim Burton, and Tom Christie, were described by writer Coram as Boyd's "acolytes".

=== 1991 Gulf War ===
Boyd is credited for largely developing the strategy for the invasion of Iraq in the Gulf War of 1991. In 1981, Boyd had presented his briefing, Patterns of Conflict, to US Representative Richard "Dick" Cheney. By 1990, Boyd had moved to Florida because of declining health, but Cheney, now Defense Secretary in the George H. W. Bush administration, called Boyd back to work on the plans for Operation Desert Storm. Boyd had substantial influence on the ultimate "left hook" design of the plan.

In a letter to the editor of Inside the Pentagon, the former Commandant of the Marine Corps General Charles C. Krulak is quoted as saying, "The Iraqi army collapsed morally and intellectually under the onslaught of American and Coalition forces. John Boyd was an architect of that victory as surely as if he'd commanded a fighter wing or a maneuver division in the desert."

=== Military reform ===
Boyd gave testimony to Congress about the status of military reform after Operation Desert Storm.

== Death ==
Boyd died of cancer in Florida on March 9, 1997, at age 70. He was buried with full military honors at Arlington National Cemetery on March 20, 1997. His burial site is Section 60, Gravesite 3660.

== Dedications ==
On Sept. 17, 1999, Nellis AFB dedicated Boyd Hall. On June 13th, 2013, Boyd Hall was re-dedicated at the U.S. Air Force Weapons School.

== Awards and decorations ==
=== Technical awards ===
- Air Force Systems Command Scientific Achievement Award (ca. 1965)
- Air Force Research and Development Award for Aeronautical Engineering (ca. 1965)
- Harold Brown Award (25 June 1975)

=== Military decorations ===
During his lengthy career, Boyd earned many decorations, including:

USAF Command Pilot Badge
Legion of Merit w/ 3 bronze oak leaf clusters		Air Medal w/ 2 bronze oak leaf clusters
Air Force Commendation Medal	Army Commendation Medal	Air Force Presidential Unit Citation
Air Force Outstanding Unit Award w/ Combat "V"	Army Good Conduct Medal	American Campaign Medal
Asiatic-Pacific Campaign Medal	World War II Victory Medal	Army of Occupation Medal w/ 'Japan' clasp
National Defense Service Medal w/ 1 bronze service star	Korean Service Medal w/ 2 bronze campaign stars	Vietnam Service Medal w/ 1 bronze campaign star
Air Force Longevity Service Award w/ 1 silver oak leaf cluster	Republic of Korea Presidential Unit Citation	Vietnam Gallantry Cross
United Nations Service Medal for Korea	Republic of Vietnam Campaign Medal	Korean War Service Medal

== Bibliography ==
- Boyd, John Richard (February 1956). "A Proposed Plan for Ftr. Vs. Ftr. Training". Fighter Weapons Newsletter. Fighter Weapons School.
- Boyd, John Richard (1964) [1960]. Aerial Attack Study (PDF) (Declassified ed.).
- Boyd, John Richard (September 3, 1976). "Destruction and Creation" (PDF). US Army Command and General Staff College.
