= McDonnell Douglas High Speed Civil Transport =

High Speed Civil Transport

General information
- Type: Supersonic airliner
- National origin: United States
- Manufacturer: McDonnell Douglas
- Status: Proposed only
- Number built: None

The McDonnell Douglas High Speed Civil Transport was a proposed supersonic airliner design that was the subject of internal and NASA contract studies in 1996. It was envisioned at a time when the company was struggling to compete in the commercial aviation market and would ultimately never progress beyond a paper design.

Design goals envisioned a 300-passenger capacity with a 5,000 nautical mile range. Projected cruise speed was between Mach 1.6 and Mach 2.4.

== Design and development ==
McDonnell Douglas conducted internal and NASA contract studies to determine the market requirements for a High Speed Civil Transport (HSCT) and resolve environmental, economic and technical issues. "McDD is participating in an international study group exploring the HSCT concept, with Aerospatiale, Boeing, British Aerospace Daimler-Benz, Japan Aircraft Industries, Alenia and Tupolev."

A first flight was envisioned for 2003, with certification projected in 2005–2006. A market for between 500 and 1,500 was also forecast. In the event, none were built and the aircraft remained a paper project. A conceptual design illustration showed a long narrow fuselage with four podded engines under sharply raked fixed delta wings mounted low at mid-fuselage and a swept cruciform tail, looking not unlike the cancelled Boeing 2707.
