= General Dynamics F-16XL =

US fighter prototype and research plane (1982–2009)

F-16XL
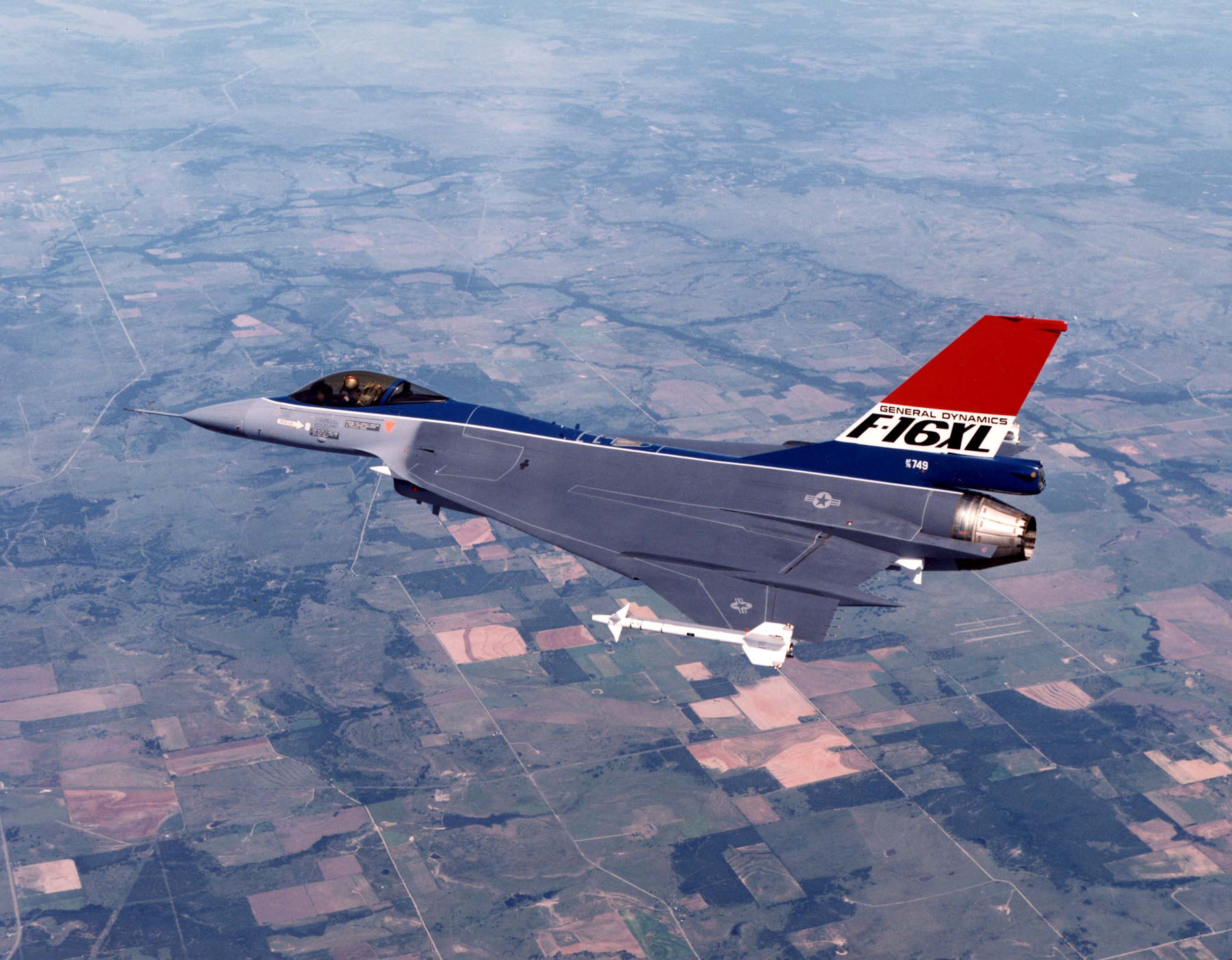
- The F-16XL which competed with the F-15E for the USAF's Enhanced Tactical Fighter contract in 1984

General information
- Type: Experimental fighter
- National origin: United States
- Manufacturer: General Dynamics
- Primary users: United States Air Force NASA
- Number built: 2

History
- First flight: 3 July 1982
- Retired: 2009
- Developed from: General Dynamics F-16 Fighting Falcon

The General Dynamics F-16XL is a derivative of the F-16 Fighting Falcon with a cranked-arrow delta wing. It entered the United States Air Force's (USAF) Enhanced Tactical Fighter (ETF) competition in 1981 but lost to the F-15E Strike Eagle. The two prototypes were shelved until being turned over to NASA for additional aeronautical research in 1988. Both aircraft were fully retired in 2009 and stored at Edwards Air Force Base; one of the two aircraft has since been placed on display.

== Development ==
=== SCAMP ===
Shortly after winning the lightweight fighter program, General Dynamics Fort Worth began investigating possible F-16 derivatives with the goal of enhancing both air-to-air and air-to-ground mission capabilities while retaining parts commonality with the F-16A. Under the leadership of Harry Hillaker (designer of the original F-16), the Supersonic Cruise and Maneuver Prototype (SCAMP) project was started. Several wing designs were considered, including one using a forward-swept wing, but the large "cranked-arrow" wing (similar to that of the Saab 35 Draken) (Note: The "cranked-arrow" delta wing originated with the Draken, which was studied by General Dynamics engineers during the SCAMP program.) was pursued due to its higher lift-to-drag ratio at supersonic speeds.

The company worked closely with NASA's Langley Research Center and invested significant R&D funds for wind tunnel testing. Over several years the design was refined which led to the final F-16XL design by late 1980.

=== Enhanced Tactical Fighter competition ===
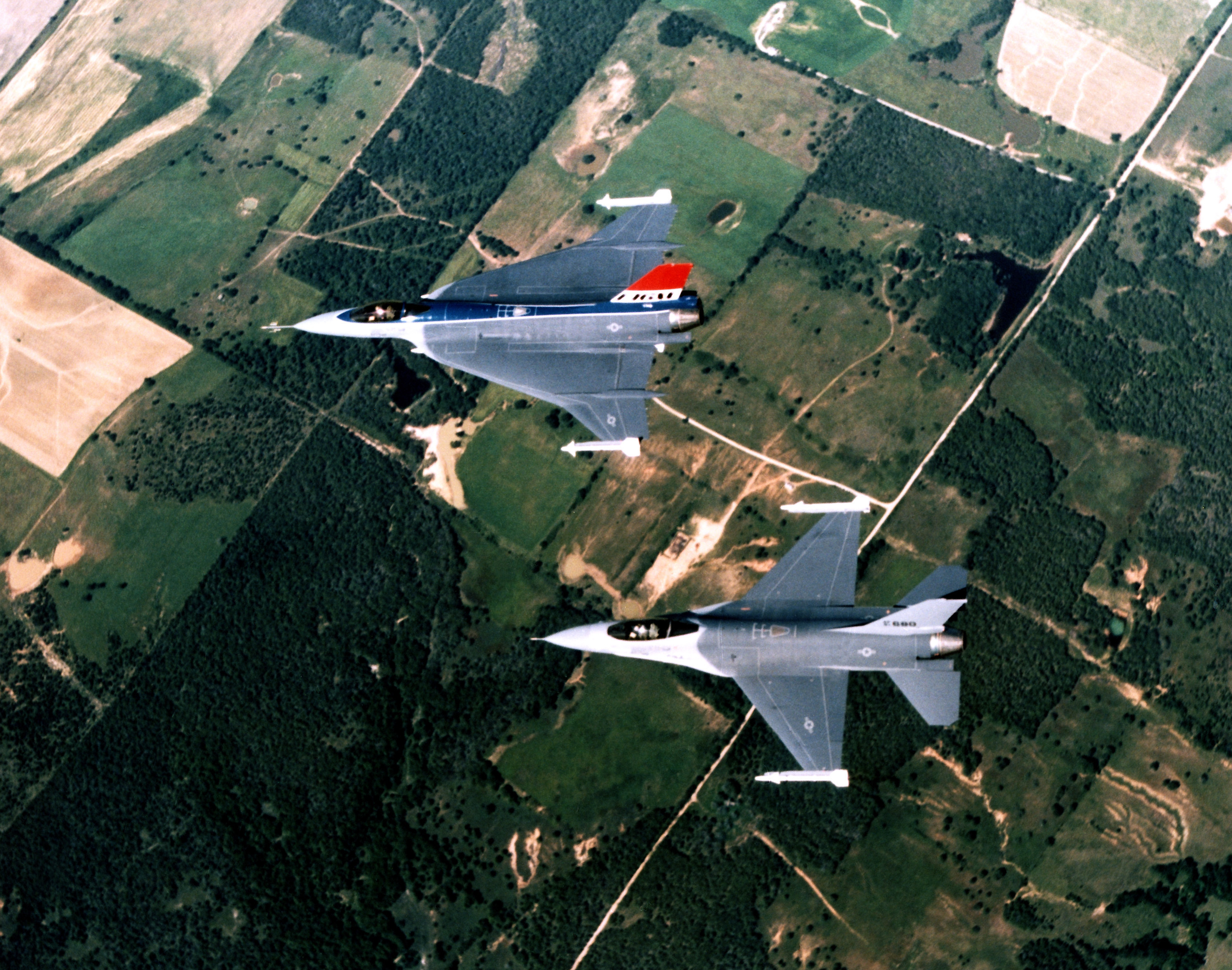
F-16XL and a conventional F-16

In 1980, the USAF signed on as a partner, providing the fuselages of the third (Note: Serial number 75-0747; would become F-16XL-2; had been severely damaged in an airshow accident in October 1980) and fifth (Note: Serial number 75-0749; would become F-16XL-1) production F-16s for conversion. These two fuselages became the only examples of the F-16XL.

In March 1981, the USAF announced the Enhanced Tactical Fighter (ETF) program to procure a replacement for the F-111 Aardvark. The concept envisioned an aircraft capable of launching deep interdiction missions without requiring additional support in the form of fighter escorts or jamming support. General Dynamics submitted the F-16XL, while McDonnell Douglas submitted a variant of the F-15 Eagle. Though the two aircraft were competing for the same role, they had fairly different design approaches. The F-15E required very few alterations from its base F-15B or D, while the F-16XL had major structural and aerodynamic differences from the original F-16. As such, the F-16XL would have required much more effort, time, and money to put into full production. Additionally, the F-15E had two engines, which gave it a much higher maximum takeoff weight and redundancy in the case of engine failure. (Note: F-16E would have had a maximum takeoff weight of 48,000 pounds (22,000 kg) versus F-15E's 80,000 pounds (36,000 kg))

In February 1984, the USAF awarded the ETF contract to McDonnell Douglas. The two F-16XLs were returned to the Air Force and placed in storage at Edwards Air Force Base. Had General Dynamics won the competition, the F-16XL would have gone into production as the F-16E/F (E for single seat, F for two seats).

== Design ==
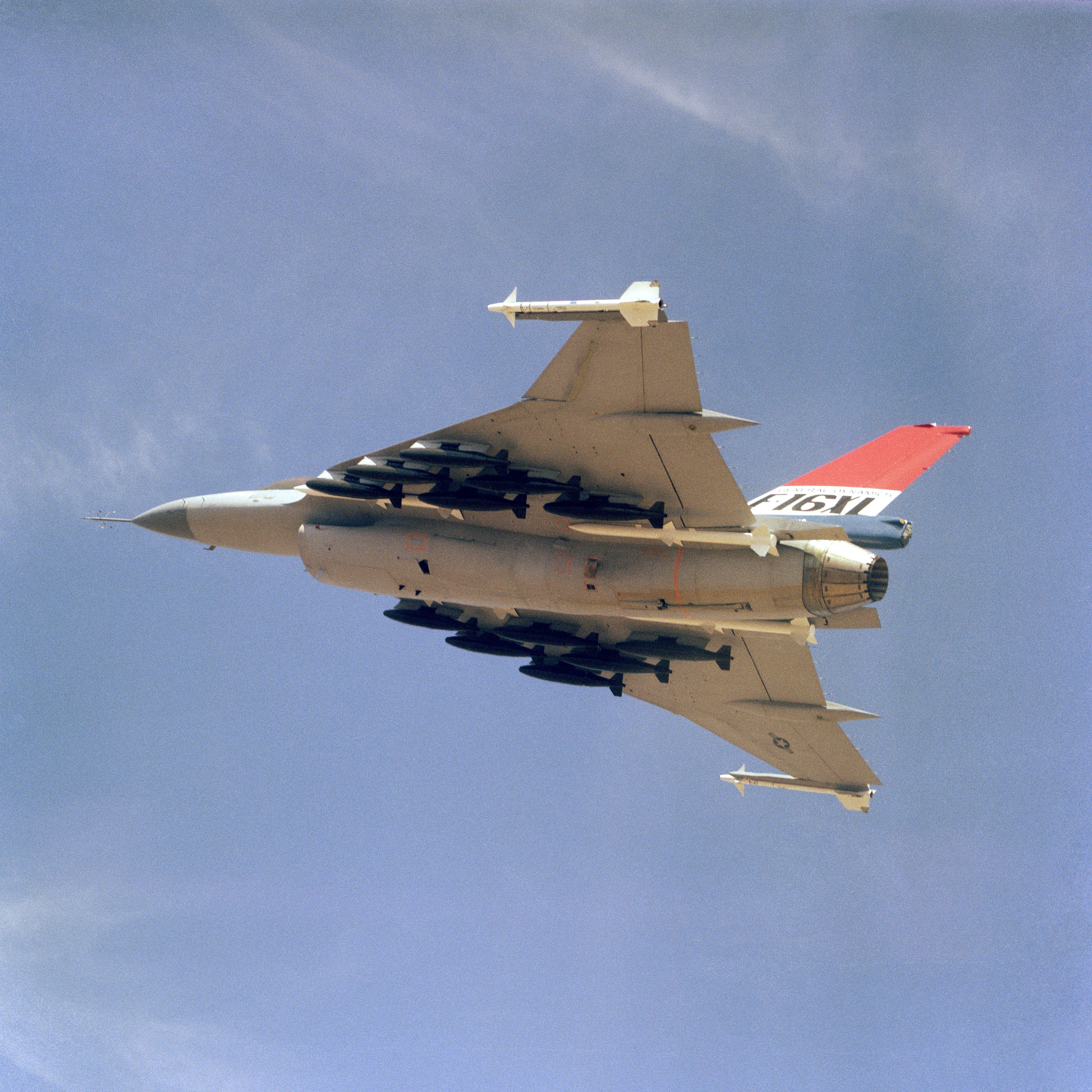
An air-to-air left underside view of an F-16XL aircraft. The aircraft is armed with two wingtip-mounted AIM-9 Sidewinder and four fuselage-mounted AIM-120 AMRAAM missiles along with 12 Mark 82 500-pound bombs.

The wing and rear horizontal control surfaces of the base F-16A were replaced with a cranked-arrow delta wing 115% larger than the original wing. Extensive use of graphite-bismaleimide composites allowed the savings of 595 pounds (270 kg) of weight, but the F-16XL-1 and XL-2 were 4,100 pounds (1,900 kg) and 5,600 pounds (2,500 kg) heavier respectively than the original F-16A. (Note: Dry weights: XL-1 weighed 19,690 pounds (8,930 kg); XL-2 weighed 21,157 pounds (9,597 kg); F-16A weighed 15,586 pounds (7,070 kg))

Less noticeable is that the fuselage was lengthened by 56 inches (140 cm) by the addition of two sections at the joints of the main fuselage sub-assemblies. With the new wing design, the tail section had to be canted up 3.16°, and the ventral fins removed, to prevent them from striking the pavement during takeoff and landing. The F-16XL-2 also received a larger inlet which would go on to be included in later F-16 variants.

These changes resulted in a 25% improvement in lift-to-drag ratio in supersonic flight while remaining comparable in subsonic flight, and a plane that reportedly handled smoothly at high speeds and low altitudes. The enlargements increased internal fuel capacity by 4,350 pounds (1,970 kg), or about 65%. (Note: Just under 11,300 pounds (5,100 kg), up from the F-16A's 6,950 pounds (3,150 kg)) The F-16XL could carry twice the ordnance of the F-16A and deliver it 50% farther. The enlarged wing and strengthened hardpoints allowed for a highly configurable payload:

- 16× 1,000 pounds (450 kg) wing hardpoints
- 5× 2,000 pounds (910 kg) wing hardpoints
- 4× semi-recessed AIM-120 AMRAAM stations under fuselage (Note: Dummy AIM-120s, fabricated from wood & sheet metal, were scabbed onto the undersurfaces of the F-16XL flight demonstrators because the AIM-120 missile had yet to be integrated onto the standard F-16; incorporation of the semisubmerged missile housing with its associated ejector launcher would have required a separate development and integration effort.)
- 2× wingtip stations
- 1× centerline station (Note: Intended for a 300-gallon drop tank)
- 2× wing "heavy/wet" stations (Note: Intended for either 2× 600-gallon drop tanks or 4× air-to-ground weapons, but not both simultaneously)
- 2× chin LANTIRN stations

== NASA testing ==
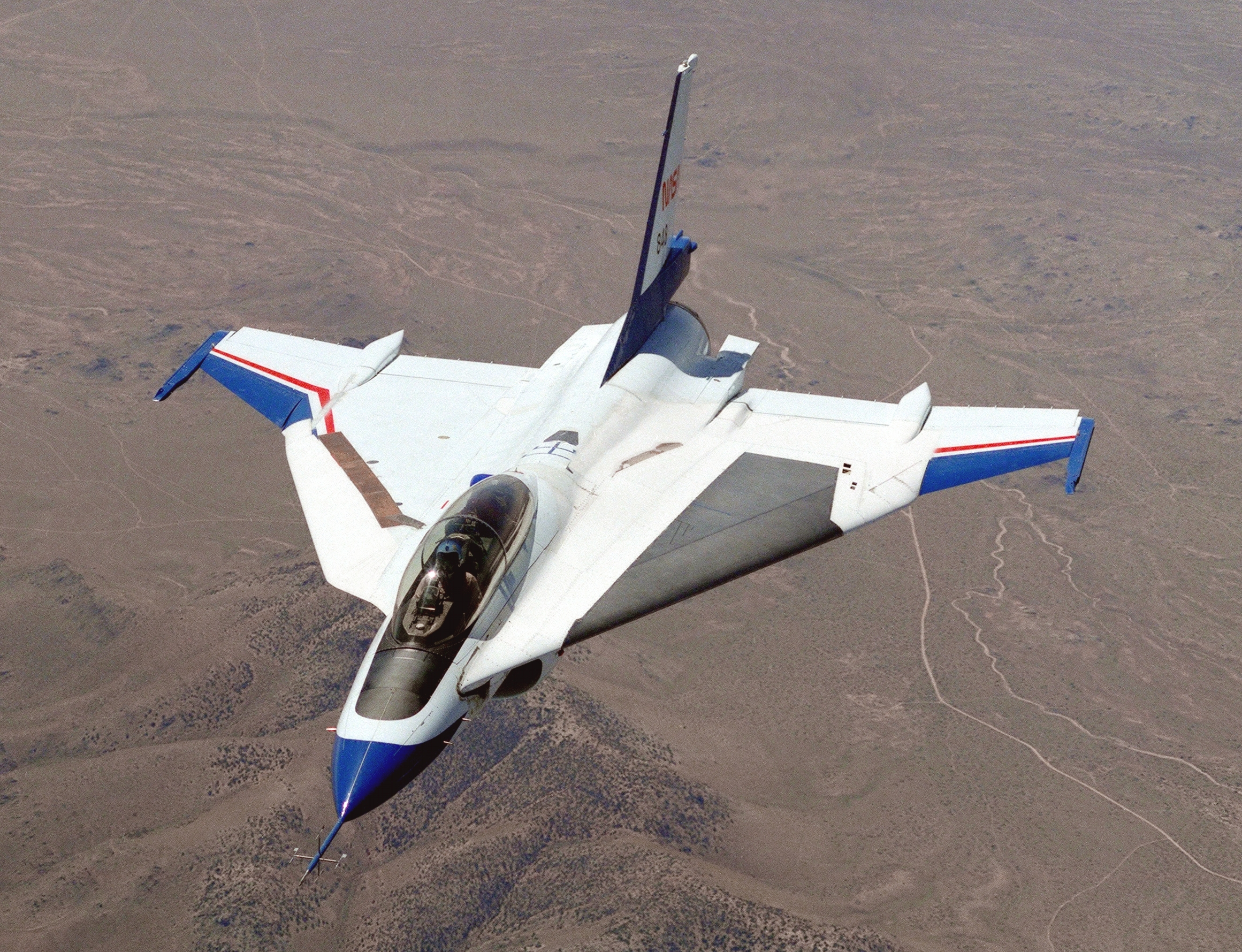
NASA F-16XL #2 conducting laminar flow research

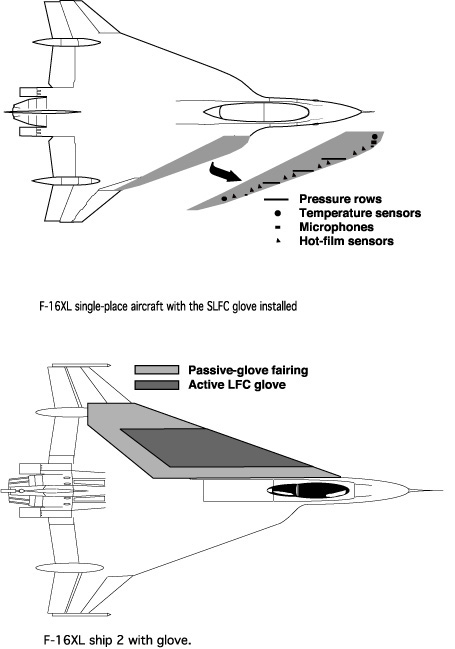
Passive and active aerodynamic gloves were used during NASA testing

In 1988, the two aircraft were turned over to NASA Ames-Dryden Flight Research Facility for supersonic laminar flow research for the High Speed Civil Transport (HSCT) program. The F-16XL was considered ideal for these tests because of its cranked-arrow wing and high-speed, high-altitude capabilities. The tests were carried out by a NASA and industry team (Note: NASA teams included the Ames-Dryden Flight Research Facility and Langley Research Center; industry partners were Boeing, McDonnell Douglas, and Rockwell International) and were intended to achieve laminar flow over the wings, validate computational fluid dynamics (CFD) design methodology, and test active suction systems. These tests involved the installation of either passive or active suction aerodynamic gloves. The active suction glove was intended to suck away turbulent airflow over the wings during supersonic flight, restoring laminar flow and reducing drag. The NASA Langley Research Center developed and coordinated F-16XL experiments.

F-16XL-1 was fitted with an active suction glove encasing the left wing. Designed and built by North American Aviation, it had laser-cut holes that were nominally 0.0025 inches (0.064 mm) diameter at a uniform 2,500 per square inch (390/cm^{2}) spacing. The suction was provided by a Convair 880 air-conditioning turbocompressor where the 20 mm cannon's ammunition had been. The glove covered over 5 square feet (0.46 m^{2}) of the wing. Overall, F-16XL-1 completed 31 test flights for these tests from May 1990 to September 1992. Afterwards, it was used to test takeoff performance, engine noise, and sonic boom phenomena.

F-16XL-2 had its engine replaced with the more powerful General Electric F110-129. It achieved limited supercruise, a design goal of the F-16XL that was never attained in ETF testing, when it reached Mach 1.1 at 20,000 feet (6,100 m) on full military power. It was mounted with a passive glove on the right wing and an active suction glove on the left wing. The passive glove was fitted with instruments to measure the flow characteristics over the wing. The active suction glove was designed and fabricated by Boeing; it was made of titanium and had over 12 million laser-cut holes, each 0.0025 inches (0.064 mm) in diameter, spaced 0.010 to 0.055 inches (0.025 to 0.140 cm) apart. Suction was provided by a cabin-air pressurization turbocompressor from a Boeing 707, installed where the 20mm ammunition drum had been, which exhausted above the right wing. Overall, F-16XL-2 performed 45 test flights from October 1995 to November 1996.

While "significant progress" was made towards achieving laminar flow at supersonic speeds, neither aircraft achieved the requisite laminar flow characteristics at intended speeds and altitudes. Nonetheless, NASA officials considered the test program to have been successful. NASA briefly investigated using a Tupolev Tu-144 which would more closely resemble the high-speed civil transport aircraft to continue supersonic laminar flow research, but did not pursue the idea due to a limited budget.

At the conclusion of their test programs in 1999, both F-16XLs were placed into storage at NASA Dryden. In 2007, Boeing and NASA studied the feasibility of returning F-16XL-1 to flight status and upgrading it with many of the improvements found in the USAF's F-16 Block 40 in order to further test sonic boom mitigation technology. F-16XL-1 was taxi tested at Dryden and given systems checks. However, both F-16XLs were retired in 2009 and stored at Edwards AFB.

== Aircraft on display ==
- 75-0747 – Museum Air Park, Air Force Flight Center Museum, Edwards AFB, California
- 75-0749 – in storage at the Air Force Flight Center Museum, Edwards AFB, California

== Specifications (F-16XL number 2) ==
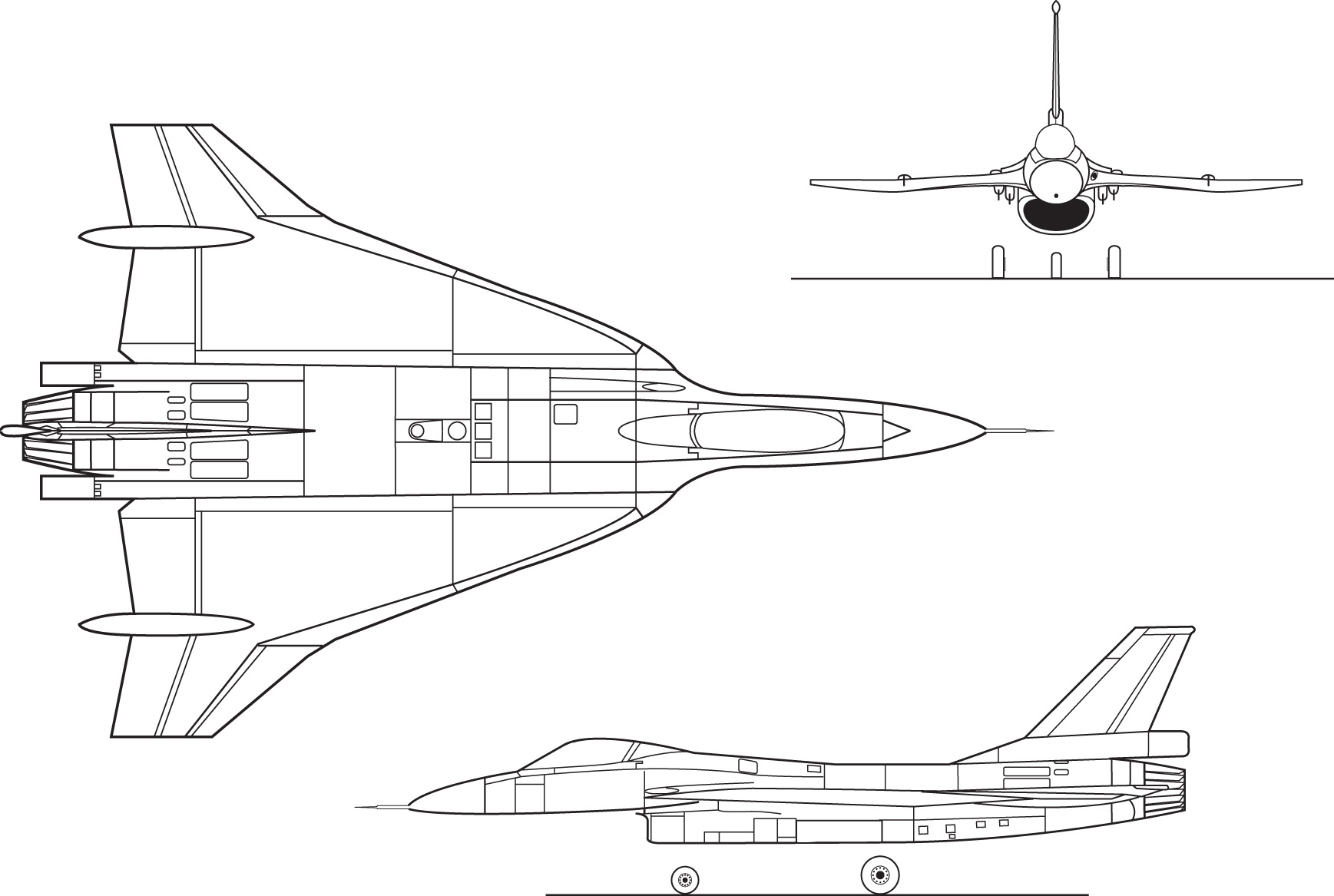
Orthographically projected diagram of an F-16XL

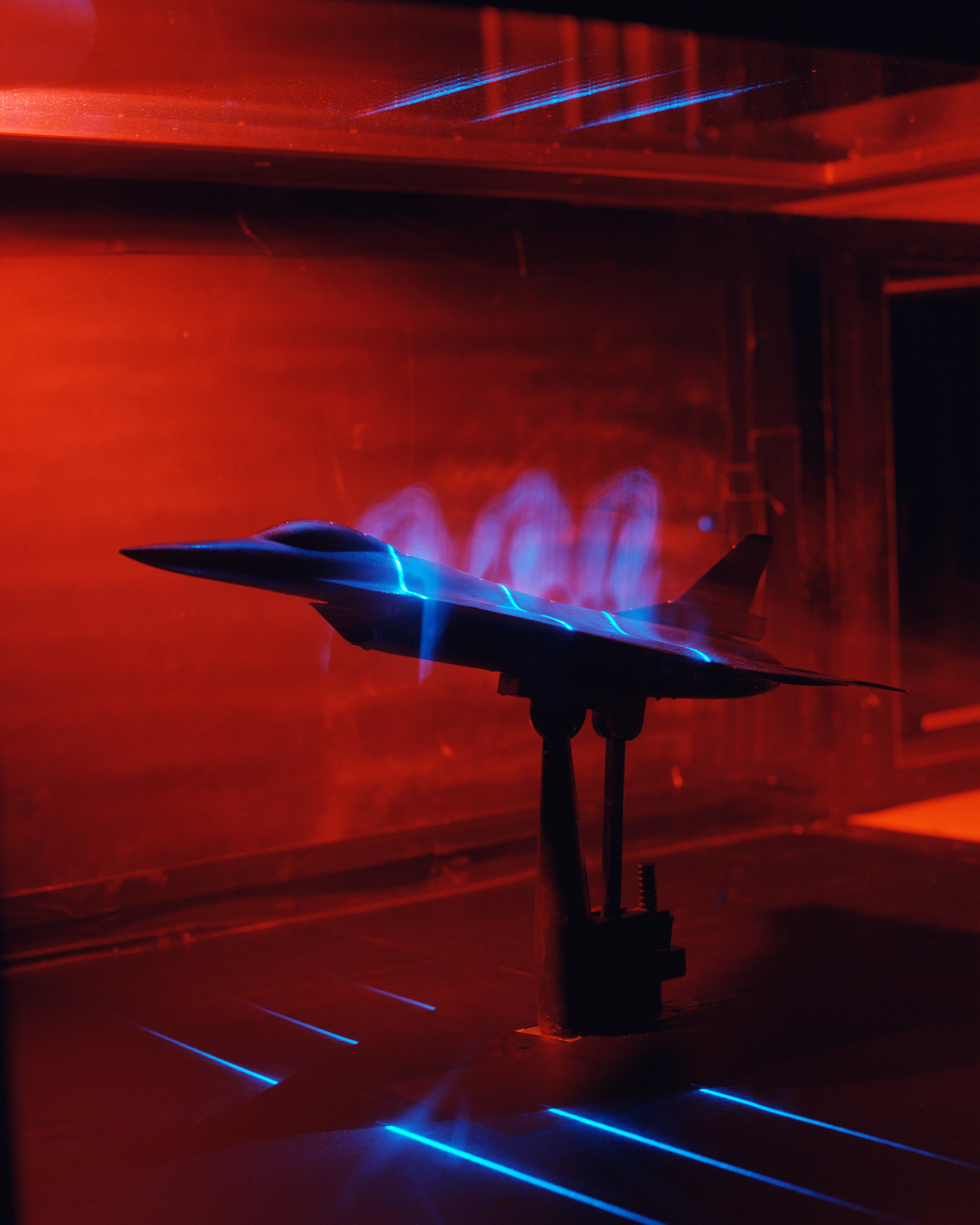
Lasers illuminate airflow over a model F-16XL in a NASA wind tunnel

Data from Darling, F-16.net, Piccirillo

General characteristics

- Crew: One (XL #1) or Two (XL #2)
- Length: 54 ft 2 in (16.51 m)
- Wingspan: 32 ft 5 in (9.88 m) (34 feet 3 inches (10.44 m) with an AIM-9 on the wingtip mount)
- Height: 17 ft 7 in (5.36 m)
- Wing area: 663 sq ft (61.6 m^{2})
- Empty weight: 21,157 lb (9,600 kg)
- Gross weight: 48,000 lb (21,800 kg)
- Max takeoff weight: 48,000 lb (21,800 kg)
- Powerplant: 1 × General Electric F110-GE-100 turbofan, 17,100 lbf (76 kN) thrust dry, 28,900 lbf (129 kN) with afterburner

Performance

- Maximum speed: 1,350 mph (2,170 km/h, 1,170 kn) (Note: Mach 2.0 was only achieved during the supersonic laminar flow tests from around 1990–1992; maximum speed prior had been limited to Mach 1.95, though faster speeds were likely possible.)
- Maximum speed: Mach 2.0
- Range: 2,285 mi (3,675 km, 1,985 nmi) (longest achieved through October 1985)
- Ferry range: 2,580 mi (4,160 km, 2,245 nmi) (with 2x 600 US gallons (2,300 L) drop tanks)
- Service ceiling: 55,000 ft (16,750 m)
- Rate of climb: 62,000 ft/min (310 m/s)

Armament

- Guns: 1 × 20 mm M61 Vulcan rotary cannon (Note: Ammunition bay was removed in 1991–1992 and replaced with a turbocompressor to provide suction for the aerodynamic glove tests)
- Hardpoints: 17 pylons with a capacity of up to 16,000 pounds (7,300 kg) of payload (Note: stations 2–5 and 13–16 were split into groups, similar to the F-15E)

== See also ==
- Tupolev Tu-144
- Saab 35 Draken
- High Speed Civil Transport

Related development

- General Dynamics F-16 Fighting Falcon
- General Dynamics F-16 VISTA

Aircraft of comparable role, configuration, and era

- McDonnell Douglas F-15E Strike Eagle

Related lists

- List of fighter aircraft
- List of military aircraft of the United States
