= Bossov Ballet Theatre =

Coordinates: 44°46′46″N 69°23′12″W

Bossov Ballet Theatre (BBT) is a non-profit performing company and an international pre-professional ballet school, located in Pittsfield, Maine. Founded in 1996, it is now affiliated with Maine Central Institute, under the direction of Natalya Nikolaevna Getman.

== Founding ==
The Theatre was founded by retired U.S. Marine Colonel Michael Wyly, as an attempt to fulfill a family dream shared by him and his daughter. He recruited Andrei Petrovitch Bossov, a former ballet star at the Mariinsky Ballet as the artistic director. Bossov introduced the Russian imperial tradition to the Theatre, which was later named after him.

== Program ==
BBT offers both year-long training program and a summer intensive program. The training programs is carried out in the Vaganova tradition. Students enrolled in the year-long program are required to take academic courses at MCI along with other local and international high school students, in addition to their ballet training. The Theatre has attracted students from across Maine, 16 states and 24 countries, who attend MCI and study ballet more than two hours a day, six days a week. Every year the BBT brings ballet productions such as The Nutcracker to local theaters and opera house. The troupe also tours internationally, performing in countries like Russia.
