= Boeing Model 908-909 =

Prototype fighter aircraft

General information
- Type: Multirole combat aircraft
- National origin: United States
- Manufacturer: Boeing
- Status: Prototype
- Number built: 1

The Boeing Model 908-909 was a prototype single-engine supersonic multirole fighter aircraft originally developed for the United States Air Force (USAF) Lightweight Fighter program, a program that later developed into the Air Combat Fighter (ACF) program. It was initially the favored design but lost at the conclusion of the competition to the General Dynamics 401, later the YF-16 (now Lockheed F-16).

Among the Boeing Model 908-909 features include a frameless bubble canopy for better visibility and a Pratt & Whitney F100 turbofan engine. Wind tunnel tests were conducted at the Langley Research Center as Test 281.

The Lightweight Fighter proposals were delivered to the Air Force by the February 18, 1972 deadline. The Boeing Model 908-909 was the winner of a preliminary analysis. Other submitted designs included the General Dynamics Model 401 and Northrop Model P-600 which were deemed second and third place, respectively. The General Dynamics Model 401 was renamed the YF-16 and was the eventual winner. The P-600 was renamed the YF-17, later F/A-18 was a further modification. The Vought Model V-1100 and Lockheed Model CL-1200 were fourth and fifth place in the preliminary analysis.

== Other sources ==
- Photographs of wind tunnel test model published by NASA
- Photograph of Boeing Model 908-909
