= Aircraft specific energy =

Aircraft-specific energy is a form of specific energy applied to aircraft and missile trajectory analysis. It represents the combined kinetic and potential energy of the vehicle at any given time. It is the total energy of the vehicle (relative to the Earth's surface) per unit weight of the vehicle. Being independent of the mass of the vehicle, it provides a powerful tool for the design of optimal trajectories. Aircraft-specific energy is very similar to specific orbital energy except that it is expressed as a positive quantity. A zero value of aircraft-specific energy represents an aircraft at rest on the Earth's surface, and the value increases as speed and altitude increases. As with other forms of specific energy, aircraft-specific energy is an intensive property and is represented in units of length since it is independent of the mass of the vehicle. That is, while the specific energy may be expressed in joule per kilogram (J/kg), the specific energy height may be expressed in meters by the formula (v^2 / 2g) + h, where V is the airspeed of the aircraft, g is the acceleration due to gravity, and h is the altitude of the aircraft.

== Applications ==
The field of trajectory optimization has made use of the concept since the 1950s in the form of energy analysis. In this approach, the specific energy is defined as one of the dynamic states of the problem and is the slowest varying state. All other states such as altitude and flight path angle are approximated as infinitely fast compared to the specific energy dynamics. This assumption allow the solution of optimal trajectories in a relatively simple form.

The specific energy is computed by the total energy (as defined above relative the Earth's surface) divided by the mass of the vehicle. It is a key element in performance of aircraft and rockets. For a rocket flying vertically (in a vacuum), it is the apogee that the rocket would obtain.

Aircraft-specific energy is used extensively in the energy–maneuverability theory governing modern aircraft dogfighting tactics. The primary goal of air combat manoeuvring is to maintain an optimal aircraft-specific energy. Speed allows an aircraft the ability to potentially outmaneuver adversaries, and altitude can be converted into speed, while also providing extended range for guided munitions (due to lower air density and therefore lower drag at any given velocity). Aircraft such as the F-16 Fighting Falcon were designed to be optimized in accordance to the energy-maneuverability theory, allowing for an aircraft to quickly gain aircraft-specific energy as fast as possible.
