= Michael Wyly =

- Alma mater: United States Naval Academy
- Military career
- Allegiance: United States
- Rank: Colonel
- Conflicts: Vietnam War

Michael Duncan Wyly (born c. 1939) is a retired U.S. Marine Colonel. In 1979, Colonel Wyly was head of tactics at the Amphibious Warfare School (AWS) where he, with John Boyd, introduced maneuver warfare.

== Military service ==
Wyly enlisted as a Marine private in 1957. He entered the U.S. Naval Academy, Annapolis, in 1958 and graduated in 1962 as Second Lieutenant of Marines. He served as Jim Webb's company commander in the Vietnam War. He co-wrote the Maneuver Warfare Handbook for the Marine Corps with William Lind.

== Ballet ==
He was executive director of Bossov Ballet Theatre, a non-profit ballet company in Pittsfield, Maine until the end of 2013. Wyly's role as director of a Ballet school is seen as unusual for a former Marine and has been the subject of articles in The Wall Street Journal, and the Christian Science Monitor.

== Criticism ==
Wyly's views were criticized in a July 1997 Atlantic Monthly article "The Widening Gap Between the Military and Society" by Thomas E. Ricks. "It is one matter to acknowledge that much in American society today is deserving of contempt. It is another matter to propose that the role of the U.S. military -- especially an all-volunteer professional military oriented toward conservative Republicanism -- is to fix those problems. Yet that is what some are doing." Ricks then quotes Wyly from the March, 1995, issue of the Marine Corps Gazette. "It is no longer enough for Marines to 'reflect' the society they defend, They must lead it, not politically but culturally. For it is the culture we are defending."

Ricks goes on to quote Wyly "We must be willing to realize that our real enemy is as likely to appear within our own borders as without." He (Wyly) then took swipes at the two fundamental principles of U.S. military professionalism: unwavering subordination to civilian control and nonparticipation in politics. Ricks then quotes Wyly from a later article: "If our laws and self-image of our role as military professionals do not allow for [the recognition that the real enemy may be within] we need to change them." Ricks writes " Wyly raised the possibility that the Marines would refuse to enforce certain laws. Specifically, if Congress were to restrict gun ownership, then Marines would need to understand that "enforcing such a restriction could quickly make us the enemy of constitutional freedom."
