= Arthur C. Agan Jr. =

United States Air Force general

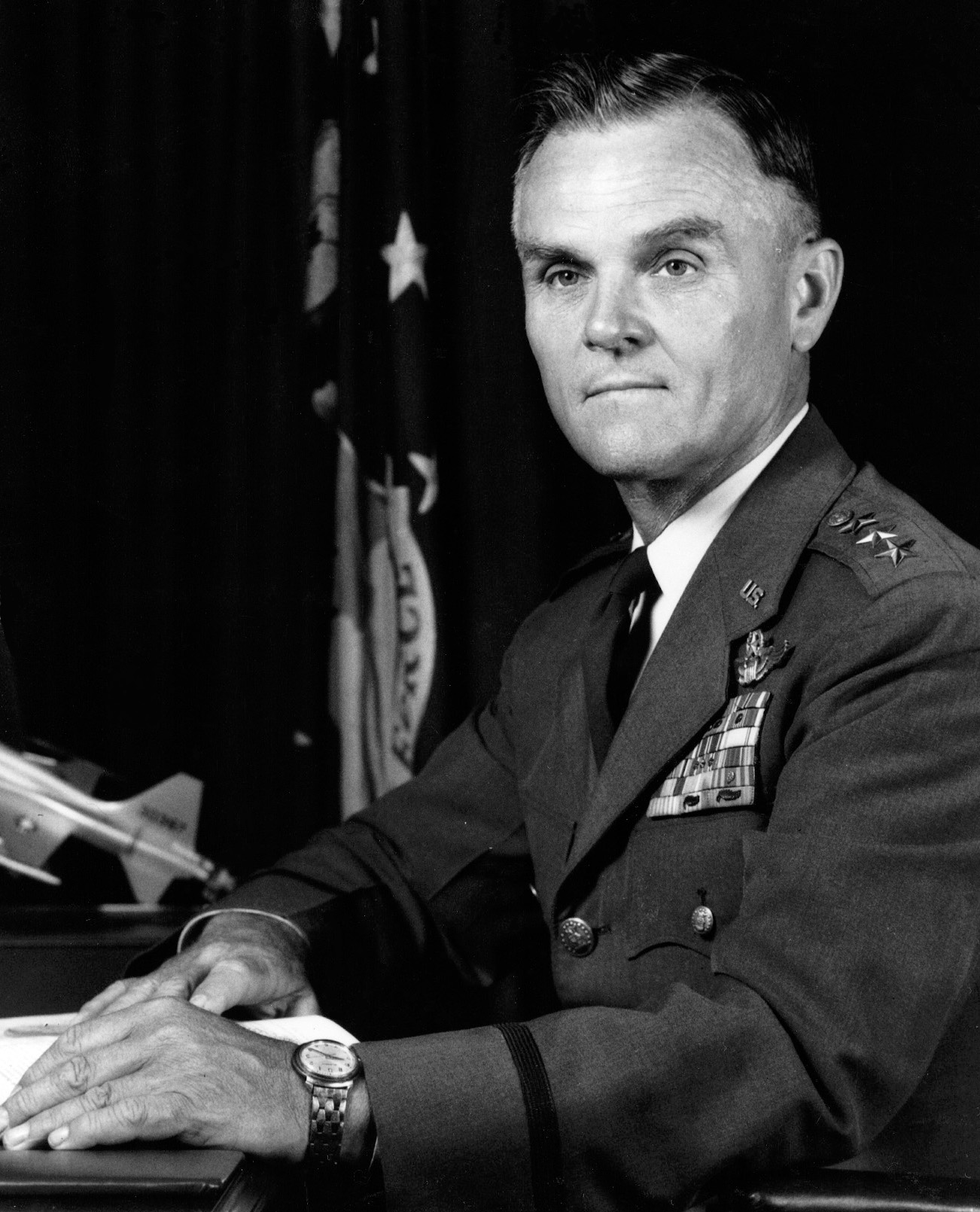
- Born: September 12, 1915; San Antonio, Texas
- Died: February 9, 2004 (aged 88); San Antonio, Texas
- Military career
- Allegiance: United States of America
- Branch: United States Air Force
- Service years: c. 1937–1970
- Rank: Lieutenant general
- Commands: Aerospace Defense Command
- Awards: Legion of Merit with three oak leaf clusters, Distinguished Flying Cross, Bronze Star Medal, Air Medal with two oak leaf clusters, Army Commendation Medal with oak leaf cluster, Purple Heart, Croix de Guerre with Palm (Belgium) and the Croix de Guerre with Palm (France)

Arthur Columbus Agan Jr. (September 12, 1915 – February 9, 2004) was an American Air Force lieutenant general who was commander of the United States Air Force Aerospace Defense Command with headquarters at Ent Air Force Base, Colorado.

== Biography ==
Agan was born in San Antonio, Texas, in 1915. After spending his boyhood in Corpus Christi, Texas, Agan entered the University of Texas. In 1937 he postponed his studies for a year to enroll as an aviation cadet in the Army Air Corps. After completion of flying training at Randolph and Kelly fields, Texas, he was commissioned a second lieutenant. He returned to the University of Texas and graduated in 1939 with a Bachelor of Business Administration degree.

Immediately following his graduation Agan resumed active military duty and obtained a regular commission through competitive examinations. Until early 1942 he served in various squadron duties as pilot, flight commander and operations officer at Barksdale Field, Louisiana, and Savannah Army Air Field, Georgia.

In February 1942 Agan was appointed chief of tactical operations at Headquarters Eighth Air Force in England remaining in that position until January 1944. He then served as assistant air chief of staff for operations for the U.S. Army Air Forces in the Mediterranean Theater of Operations. Assigned to the First Fighter Group in Italy in September 1944, Agan became commander of the group in November 1944. After completing 45 combat missions, with a total of 220 combat hours, he was shot down over Wiener Neustadt in March 1945 and interned as a prisoner of war until just prior to V-E Day.

Returning to the United States in 1945, Agan was assigned to the Personnel Services Division, Headquarters, Army Air Force, Washington, D.C. He became chief of that division in January 1946.

From August 1946 to February 1949 Agan was assistant chief of staff for personnel, Air Defense Command, and later deputy for personnel and administration, Continental Air Command, both at Mitchel Field, New York. He then became commander of the 4th Fighter Wing at Andrews Air Force Base, Maryland, and in May 1949 became commander of the 33rd Fighter Wing at Otis Air Force Base, Massachusetts.

Two years later Agan assumed the duties of commander of the 32nd Air Division, with headquarters at Stewart Air Force Base, New York. He remained in that assignment until September 1951, when he attended the Air Command and Staff School and in October 1951 was assigned to the school staff at Maxwell Air Force Base, Alabama. He then attended the Air War College, also at Maxwell, and graduated in June 1953.

In August 1953 Agan became commander of the 58th Fighter-Bomber Wing in Korea. Upon his return to the United States the following year, Agan was assigned to Headquarters Eastern Air Defense Force at Stewart Air Force Base, N.Y. There he served as deputy for operations and later as chief of staff, Continental Air Defense Command Eastern CONAD Region.

Agan became commander of the 26th Air Division, with headquarters at Roslyn Air Force Station, N.Y., in August 1957. During the following year, and under Agan's leadership, the operational concepts for the Semi-Automatic Ground Environment system of air defense and the plans for transition of air defense units to that system were developed and initiated.

In September 1958 Agan assumed command of the New York Air Defense Sector with headquarters at McGuire Air Force Base, N.J., the first operational SAGE Sector in the nation. Reassigned to Headquarters ADC at Ent Air Force Base, Colo., in October 1959, he assumed the position of deputy for plans, later redesignated deputy chief of staff for plans. In July 1963 Agan was reassigned to Hancock Field, New York, for duty as commander, 26th Air Division (SAGE).

In July 1964 Agan was assigned to the Pentagon, Washington, D.C., for duty as director of plans, deputy chief of staff for plans and operations. In December 1964 he was reassigned as assistant deputy chief of staff for plans and operations. He was assigned as vice commander-in-chief, U.S. Air Forces in Europe in September 1966.

Agan assumed the duties of commander of the Aerospace Defense Command with headquarters at Ent Air Force Base, Colorado, in August 1967. He retired March 1, 1970.

His military decorations include the Legion of Merit with three oak leaf clusters, Distinguished Flying Cross, Bronze Star Medal, Air Medal with two oak leaf clusters, Army Commendation Medal with oak leaf cluster, Purple Heart, Croix de Guerre with Palm (Belgium) and the Croix de Guerre with Palm (France).

== Effective dates of promotion ==
| Insignia | Rank | Date |
|---|---|---|
| | Lieutenant general | June 29, 1966 |
| | Major general | July 1, 1960 |
| | Brigadier general | December 13, 1955 |
| | Colonel | December 29, 1943 |
| | Lieutenant colonel | December 22, 1942 |
| | Major | May 1, 1942 |
| | Captain | April 6, 1942 |
| | First lieutenant | September 9, 1940 |
| | Second lieutenant | October 6, 1937 |
