= Lightweight Fighter program =

United States Air Force technology evaluation program

Lightweight Fighter (LWF)
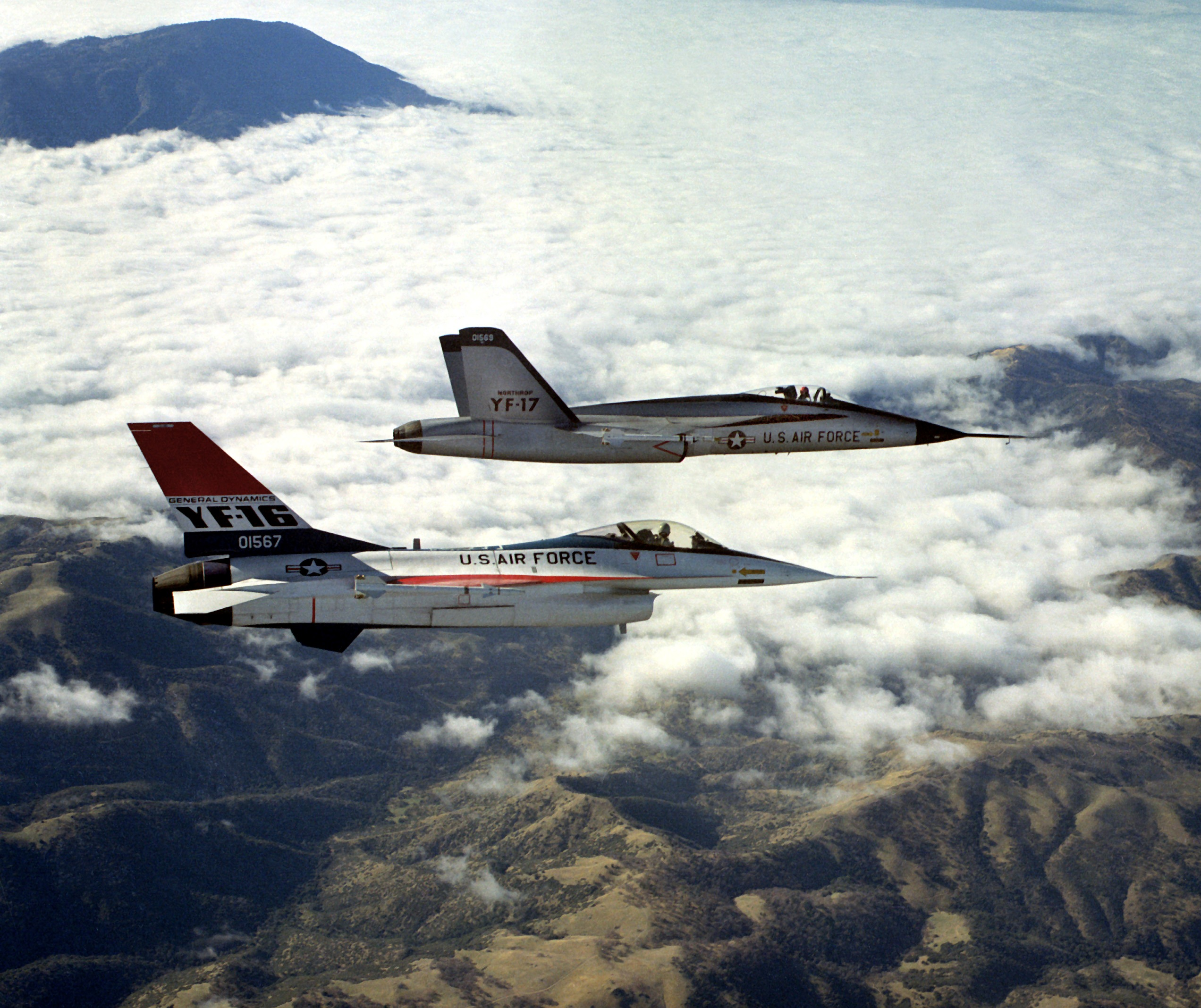
- A YF-16 and a YF-17, flying side-by-side, armed with AIM-9 Sidewinder missiles

General information
- Project for: Light fighter
- Issued by: United States Air Force
- Proposals: Boeing, General Dynamics, Lockheed, Northrop, and Vought
- Prototypes: General Dynamics YF-16; Northrop YF-17

History
- Outcome: F-16 selected for production
- Related: Navy Air Combat Fighter

The Lightweight Fighter (LWF) program was a United States Air Force technology evaluation program initiated in the late 1960s by a group of officers and defense analysts known as the "Fighter Mafia". It was spurred by then-Major John Boyd's 'energy-maneuverability' (E-M) theory, which indicated that excessive weight would have severely debilitating consequences on the maneuverability of an aircraft. Boyd's design called for a light-weight fighter with a high thrust-to-weight ratio, high maneuverability, and a gross weight of less than 20,000 lb (9,100 kg), half that of its counterpart, the McDonnell Douglas F-15 Eagle. It resulted in the development of the General Dynamics YF-16 and Northrop YF-17. Late in the program, in 1974, with the promise of European sales, the Air Force changed the program name to Air Combat Fighter (ACF), and committed to purchasing 650 models of the YF-16, adopted as the F-16 Fighting Falcon. The U.S. Navy adopted a modified version of the YF-17 as the McDonnell Douglas F/A-18 Hornet.

== History ==
=== "Missileers" ===
Project Forecast, a 1963 Air Force study, attempted to identify future weapons trends and "certain high-priority areas for research and development (R&D), recommendations based on the greatest potential payoff for the future." The report strongly suggested that future air combat would be carried out primarily by long-range missile fire. Future "fighters" would be designed primarily for long range, high speed, and equipped with extremely large radar systems in order to detect and engage opposing fighters at beyond visual range (BVR). This made them much more like interceptors than classic fighter designs, and led to increasingly heavier and more technologically sophisticated designs – and thus costlier.

The US Navy had long ago come to similar conclusions, and had been designing a series of aircraft dedicated to this role. Notable among these was the well named Douglas F6D Missileer, a long endurance but slow and unmaneuverable design equipped with very powerful missiles and radar for fleet defense. The US Air Force had similar designs, but these had been dedicated to the interceptor role, where the large size of its targets allowed reasonable radar performance. As radar equipment improved, in particular the introduction of Doppler radar systems, fighters gained similar range performance against smaller targets. By the early 1960s, even before the release of Forecast, both the Air Force and Navy expected to use the General Dynamics F-111 Aardvark (then still in development as the TFX) and McDonnell Douglas F-4 Phantom II for their long- and medium-range needs. The perception of a declining need for close-in "dogfighting" capabilities resulted in the original decision to not install internal cannons in the Phantom.

=== Combat experience and E-M theory ===
However, real-world experience in the Vietnam War revealed some shortcomings in American fighter capabilities, as early generation Soviet jet fighters proved to be more of a challenge than expected for U.S. designs. Although U.S. pilots had achieved favorable kill-to-loss ratios, combat had revealed that air-to-air missiles (AAM) of this era were significantly less reliable than anticipated. Furthermore, the rules of engagement in Vietnam precluded long-range missile attacks in most instances, as visual identification was normally required. Under these conditions, combat invariably closed to short ranges where maneuverability and short-range air-to-air weapons became critical, even for dedicated interceptors like the Convair F-102 Delta Dagger.

Based on his experiences in the Korean War and as a fighter tactics instructor, in the early 1960s Colonel John Boyd and mathematician Thomas Christie developed the Energy-Maneuverability (E-M) theory of the value of aircraft specific energy maintenance as an advantage in fighter combat. Maneuverability was the means of getting “inside” an adversary’s decision-making cycle, a process Boyd called the "OODA" loop (from "Observation-Orientation-Decision-Action"). This approach emphasized an aircraft design capable of “fast transients” – quick changes in speed, altitude, and direction. A fighter that is superior in its ability to gain or lose energy while out-turning an opponent can initiate and control any engagement opportunity; a fast transient capability allows the pilot to stay inside a hard-turning opponent when on the offensive or to force an overshoot of an opponent when on the defensive.

These parameters called for a small, lightweight aircraft – which would minimize drag and increase the thrust-to-weight ratio – but a larger, higher-lift wing to minimize wing loading – which tends to reduce top speed while increasing payload, and can lower range (which can be compensated for by increased fuel in the larger wing).

=== Lightweight Fighter program ===
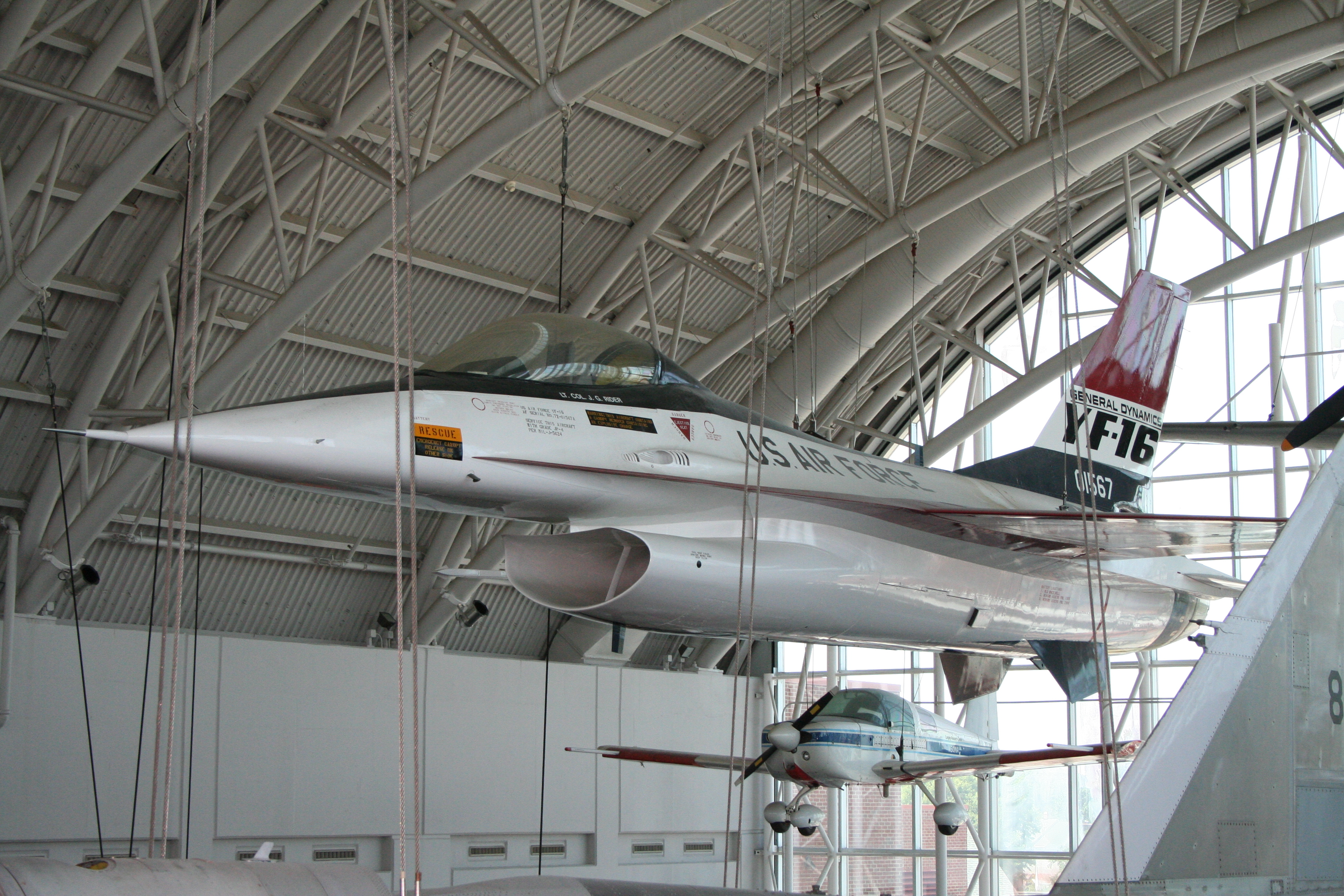
YF-16 on display at the Virginia Air and Space Center

The need for new air superiority fighters led the USAF to initiate two concept development studies in 1965: the Fighter Experimental (F-X) project originally envisioned a 60,000-pound (27,200 kg) class twin-engine design with a variable-geometry wing. This would be a very expensive aircraft, too expensive to consider equipping the entire Air Force with it as its standard aircraft. For this reason a less-expensive Advanced Day Fighter (ADF) was also considered, a lightweight design in the 25,000 lb (11,300 kg) class which would out-perform the MiG-21 by 25%.

Boyd used his E-M theory to argue that the F-X design was far too heavy, and this led to new requirements for a smaller F-X in the 40,000-pound (18,100 kg) class. However, the appearance of the Mach-3-capable MiG-25 in July 1967 led to serious concerns within the Defense Department that the Soviets had developed a super fighter capable of outrunning anything the US fielded, while its huge wing would make it highly maneuverable. In response, the ADF effort was essentially ignored in favour of an all-out effort to develop a superior F-X, which would emerge as the F-15 Eagle.

Boyd was unimpressed with the resulting weight growth in the F-15, and the shelving of the ADF. In the late 1960s he gathered a group of like-minded innovators that became known as the "Lightweight Fighter Mafia". In 1969, this "Fighter Mafia" was able to secure funds for a "Study to Validate the Integration of Advanced Energy-Maneuverability Theory with Trade-Off Analysis". General Dynamics received $49,000 and Northrop $100,000 study contracts to design concepts that embodied Boyd's E-M theory – a small, low-drag, low-weight, pure fighter with no bomb racks; their work would lead to the YF-16 and YF-17, respectively.

Although the Air Force’s F-X proponents remained hostile to the concept because they perceived it as a threat to the F-15 program, the ADP concept (revamped and renamed as the "F-XX") gained civilian political support under the reform-minded Deputy Secretary of Defense David Packard, who favored the idea of competitive prototyping. As a result, in May 1971 the Air Force Prototype Study Group was established, with Boyd a key member. Two of its six proposals would be funded, one being the Lightweight Fighter (LWF). The Request for Proposals (RFP) was issued 6 January 1972, and called for a 20,000 lb (9,100 kg) class fighter with a good turn rate, acceleration and range, and optimized for combat at speeds of Mach 0.6–1.6 and altitudes of 30,000–40,000 ft (9,150–12,200 m). This was the region in which the USAF expected most future air combat to occur, based on studies of the Vietnam, Six-Day, and Indo-Pakistani wars. The anticipated average flyaway cost of a production version was $3 million.

Five manufacturers – Boeing, General Dynamics, Lockheed, Northrop, and Vought – submitted proposals. The Vought V-1100 and the Lockheed CL-1200-2 Lancer were eliminated in March 1972. Though the Boeing Model 908-909 was initially most favored, it was quite similar in technology and appearance to the cheaper General Dynamics Model 401-16B. Since one of the goals of the program was to validate emerging technologies, Secretary of the Air Force Robert Seamans chose to select the General Dynamics and Northrop entries.

The first YF-16 had its official maiden flight on 2 February 1974. The second YF-16 prototype first flew on 9 May 1974. This was followed by the first flights of the Northrop’s YF-17 prototypes, which were achieved on 9 June and 21 August 1974, respectively. The fly-off commenced in 1974 as both prototypes were delivered. The YF-16s would complete 330 sorties during the flyoff, accumulating a total of 417 flight hours; the YF-17s would accomplish 268 sorties.

=== Air Combat Fighter competition ===
Three factors would converge to turn the LWF into a serious acquisition program. First, four North Atlantic Treaty Organization (NATO) members – Belgium, Denmark, the Netherlands, and Norway – were looking to replace their F-104G fighter-bomber variants of the Lockheed F-104 Starfighter interceptor; furthermore, they were seeking an aircraft that their own aerospace industries could manufacture under license, as they had the F-104G. In early 1974, they reached an agreement with the U.S. that if the USAF placed orders for the aircraft winning the LWF flyoff, they would consider ordering it as well.

Secondly, while the USAF was not particularly interested in a complementary air superiority fighter competing with F-X, it did need to begin replacing its F-4 and Republic F-105 Thunderchief fighter-bombers. In April 1974, U.S. Secretary of Defense James R. Schlesinger announced that the LWF program would be redirected to a multirole fighter design in the new Air Combat Fighter (ACF) competition. ACF would not be a pure fighter, but more of a fighter-bomber, which essentially ended opposition from the F-X group.

Finally, the U.S. Congress was seeking to achieve greater commonality in fighter procurements by the Air Force and Navy. In August 1974, Congress redirected funds for the Navy’s VFAX program to a new Navy Air Combat Fighter (NACF) program that would essentially be a navalized variant of ACF. These requirements meshed relatively well, but the timing of the procurement was driven by the timeframe needs of the four allies, who had formed a "Multinational Fighter Program Group" (MFPG) and were pressing for a U.S. decision by December 1974. The U.S. Air Force had planned to announce the ACF winner in May 1975, but the decision was advanced to the beginning of the year, and accelerated testing.

ACF also raised the stakes for GD and Northrop because it brought in further competitors intent on securing the lucrative order that was touted at the time as "the arms deal of the century". These included the Dassault-Breguet Mirage F1 E (E for Europe) powered by a Snecma M53 engine and utilizing a fly-by-wire system similar to the one used in Dassault Mirage 2000 series. (Note: The F-1 E should not be confused with the Dassault Mirage F1E version in service in the French Air Force at the end of the 20th century.) Only two prototypes were built for the ACF program, the Anglo-French SEPECAT Jaguar, and a proposed derivative of the Saab 37 Viggen named the Saab 37E Eurofighter (not to be confused with the later and unrelated Eurofighter Typhoon). Northrop also offered their earlier design, the P-530 Cobra, which looked very similar to its YF-17. The Jaguar and Cobra were dropped by the MFPG early on, leaving two European and the two U.S. LWF designs as candidates.

On 11 September 1974, the U.S. Air Force confirmed firm plans to place an order for of the winning ACF design sufficient to equip five tactical fighter wings. The flight test program revealed that the YF-16 had superior acceleration, climb rates, endurance, and (except around Mach 0.7) turn rates. Another advantage was that the YF-16 – unlike the YF-17 – employed the Pratt & Whitney F100 turbofan engine, which was the same powerplant used by the F-15; such commonality would lower the unit costs of the engines for both programs. On 13 January 1975, Secretary of the Air Force John L. McLucas announced that the YF-16 had been selected as the winner of the ACF competition. The chief reasons given by the Secretary for the decision were the YF-16's lower operating costs; greater range; and maneuver performance that was "significantly better" than that of the YF-17, especially at near-supersonic and supersonic speeds.

However, in the Navy Air Combat Fighter (NACF) competition, the Navy announced on 2 May 1975 that it selected the YF-17 as the basis for what would become the McDonnell Douglas F/A-18 Hornet.
