= High Speed Civil Transport =

NASA project to develop a supersonic passenger aircraft

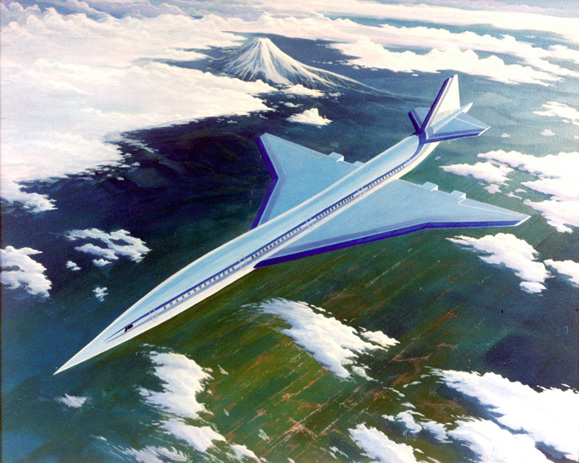

General information
- Project for: Supersonic transport
- Issued by: NASA

History
- Outcome: Study only

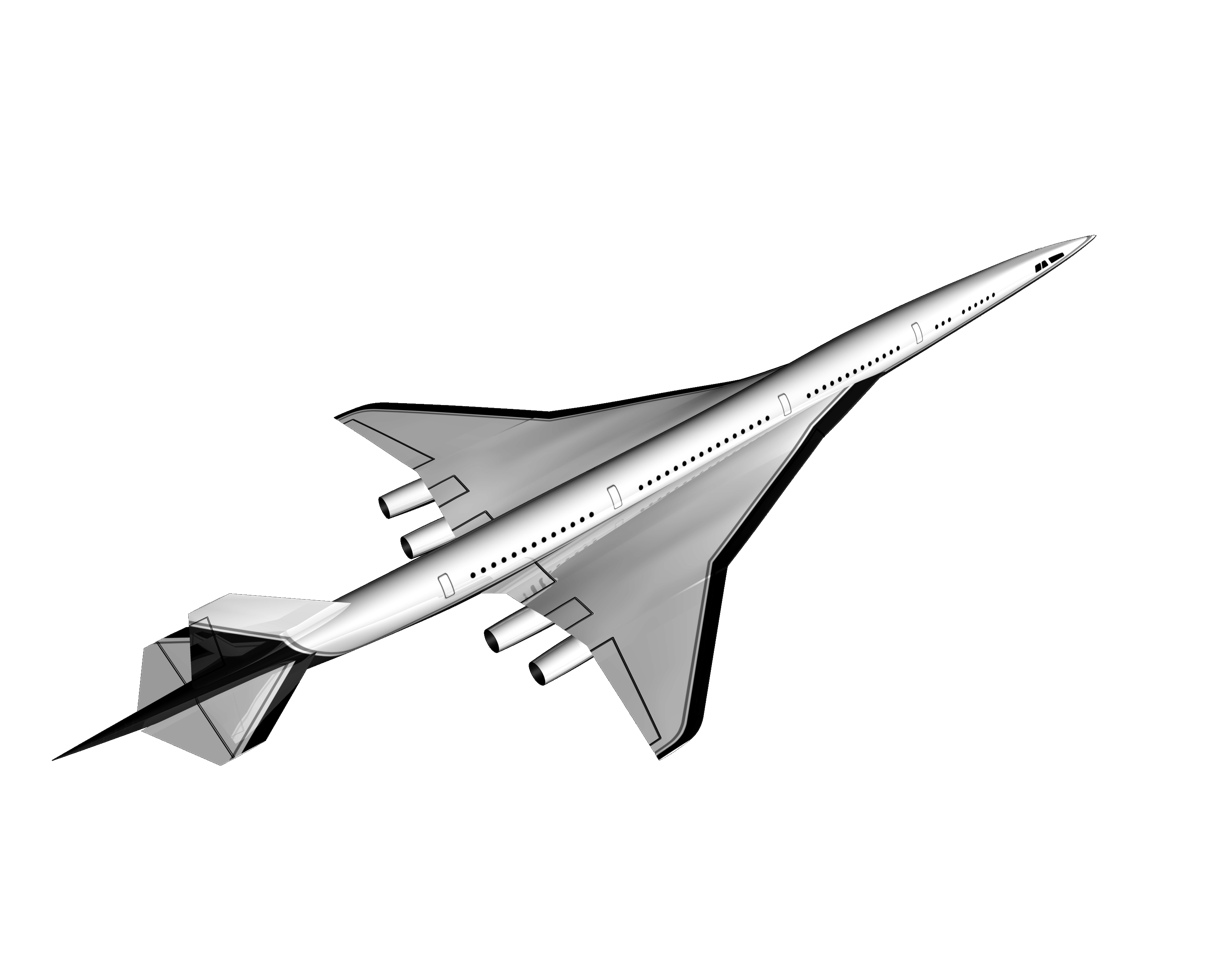
HSCT conceptual render released in July 1998

The High Speed Civil Transport (HSCT) was the focus of the NASA High-Speed Research (HSR) program, which intended to develop the technology needed to design and build a supersonic transport that would be environmentally acceptable and economically feasible. The aircraft was to be a future supersonic passenger aircraft, baselined to cruise at Mach 2.4, or more than twice the speed of sound. The project started in 1990 and ended in 1999.

It was meant to cross the Atlantic or the Pacific Ocean in half the time of a non-supersonic aircraft. It was also intended to be fuel efficient, carry 300 passengers, and allow customers to buy tickets at a price only slightly higher than those of subsonic aircraft. The goal was to provide sufficient technology for an industry-led product launch decision in 2002, and if a product was launched, a maiden flight within 20 years.

The program was based on the successes and failures of the British/French Concorde and the Russian Tupolev Tu-144, as well as a previous NASA Supersonic Transport (SST) program from the early 1970s (for the latter, see Lockheed L-2000 and Boeing 2707.) While the Concorde and Tu-144 programs both yielded production aircraft, neither was produced in sufficient numbers to pay for their development costs.

== History ==
In 1989, NASA and industry partners began investigating the feasibility of radically higher-speed passenger aircraft. By 1990 the design converged to a Mach 2.4, 300-passenger capable aircraft, and the High-Speed Research program was started. The project was split into two phases which examined a variety of areas for development. The first phase "focused on the development of technology concepts for environmental compatibility". The second phase aimed to demonstrate the environmental technologies and other high-risk technologies for economic viability.

Phase 1 focused on several environmental concerns: NOx emissions which can deplete the ozone layer, community noise, sonic boom noise, and high-altitude radiation. Tests relevant to each concern were carried out. A U-2 spy plane, renamed to the ER-2, was used to measure high-altitude emissions from a Concorde jet and to measure the radiation environment at high altitudes. New engine nozzle technologies were tested to reduce takeoff and landing noise. Sonic boom mitigation technologies were tested using an SR-71 Blackbird, but were considered to be economically unviable; instead, HSCT would be limited to subsonic speeds over land.

Phase 2 demonstrated several key technologies' economic viability. Two F-16XLs were used to test supersonic laminar flow control and to validate advanced CFD design methods. Instead of using the droop nose like that on the Concorde, an "external vision" system would have replaced the cockpit windows entirely with computer-generated graphics made available to the pilots on cockpit displays. Finally, a variety of materials were designed and tested against the very high temperature of Mach 2.4 flight, with titanium and a unique variety of carbon fiber being leading candidates for different areas of the craft.

Though the project was largely successful, it was canceled in 1999 due to budget constraints, as well as Boeing withdrawing interest (i.e. funding) from the project.
