= Enhanced Tactical Fighter =

1980s United States Air Force strike fighter/interdictor program

Enhanced Tactical Fighter (ETF)

General information
- Project for: Strike fighter/interdictor
- Issued by: United States Air Force
- Prototypes: General Dynamics F-16XL; McDonnell Douglas F-15E Strike Eagle

History
- Outcome: F-15E Strike Eagle selected

The Enhanced Tactical Fighter (ETF), later renamed Dual-Role Fighter (DRF), was a strike fighter/interdictor program conducted by the United States Air Force (USAF) between 1980 and 1984, to seek replacements for the General Dynamics F-111 Aardvark. It resulted in the McDonnell Douglas F-15E Strike Eagle.

== Competition ==
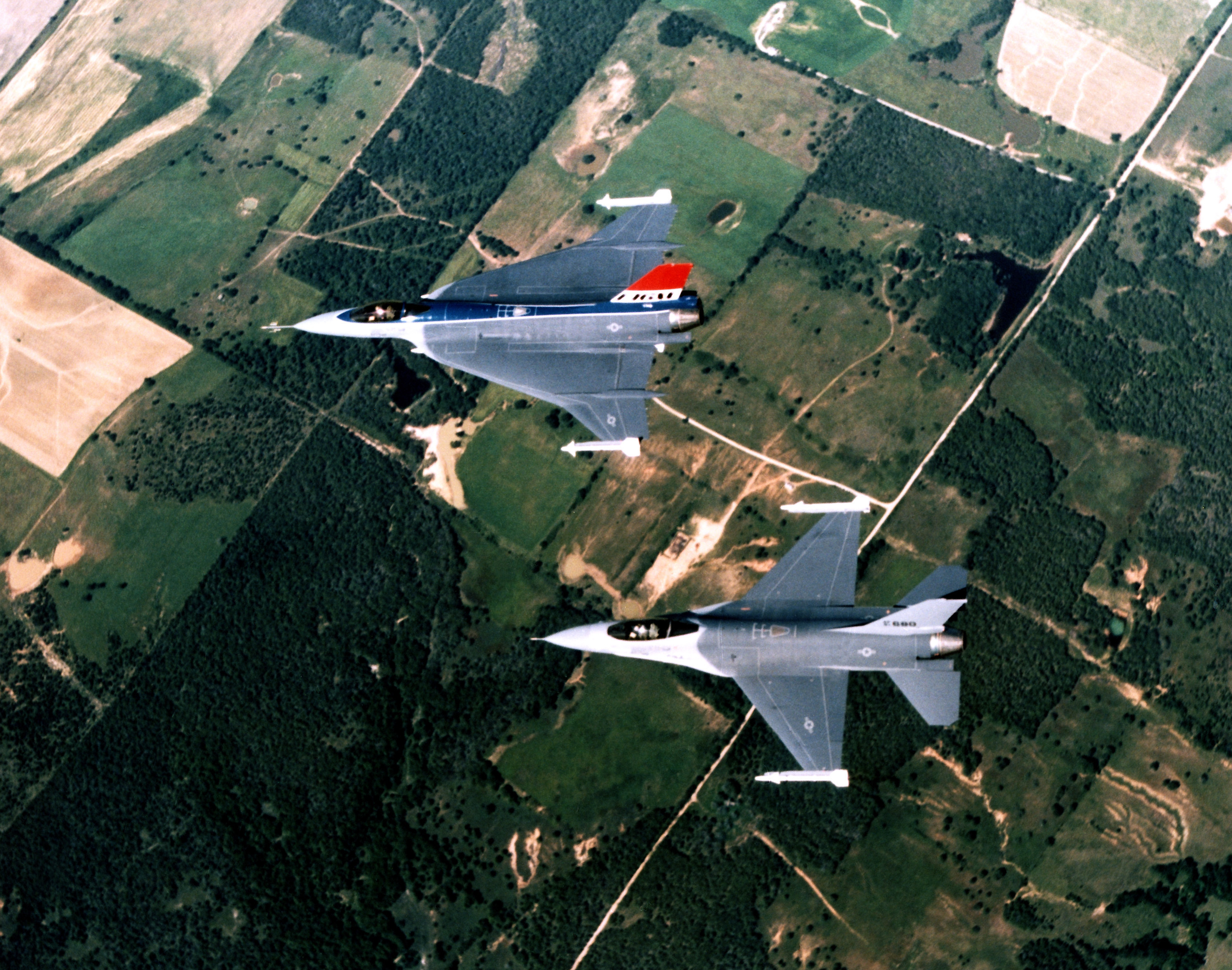
F-16XL and a conventional F-16

In March 1981, the USAF announced the Enhanced Tactical Fighter program to procure a replacement for the F-111 Aardvark. The program was later renamed the Dual-Role Fighter (DRF) competition. The concept envisioned an aircraft capable of launching deep air interdiction missions without requiring additional support by fighter escort or jamming.

General Dynamics submitted the F-16XL, while McDonnell Douglas submitted the F-15E Strike Eagle. The Panavia Tornado was also a candidate, but since the aircraft lacked a credible air superiority fighter capability, coupled with the fact that it is not American-made, it was not seriously considered. The DRF evaluation team, under the direction of Brigadier General Ronald W. Yates, ran from 1981 through 30 April 1983.

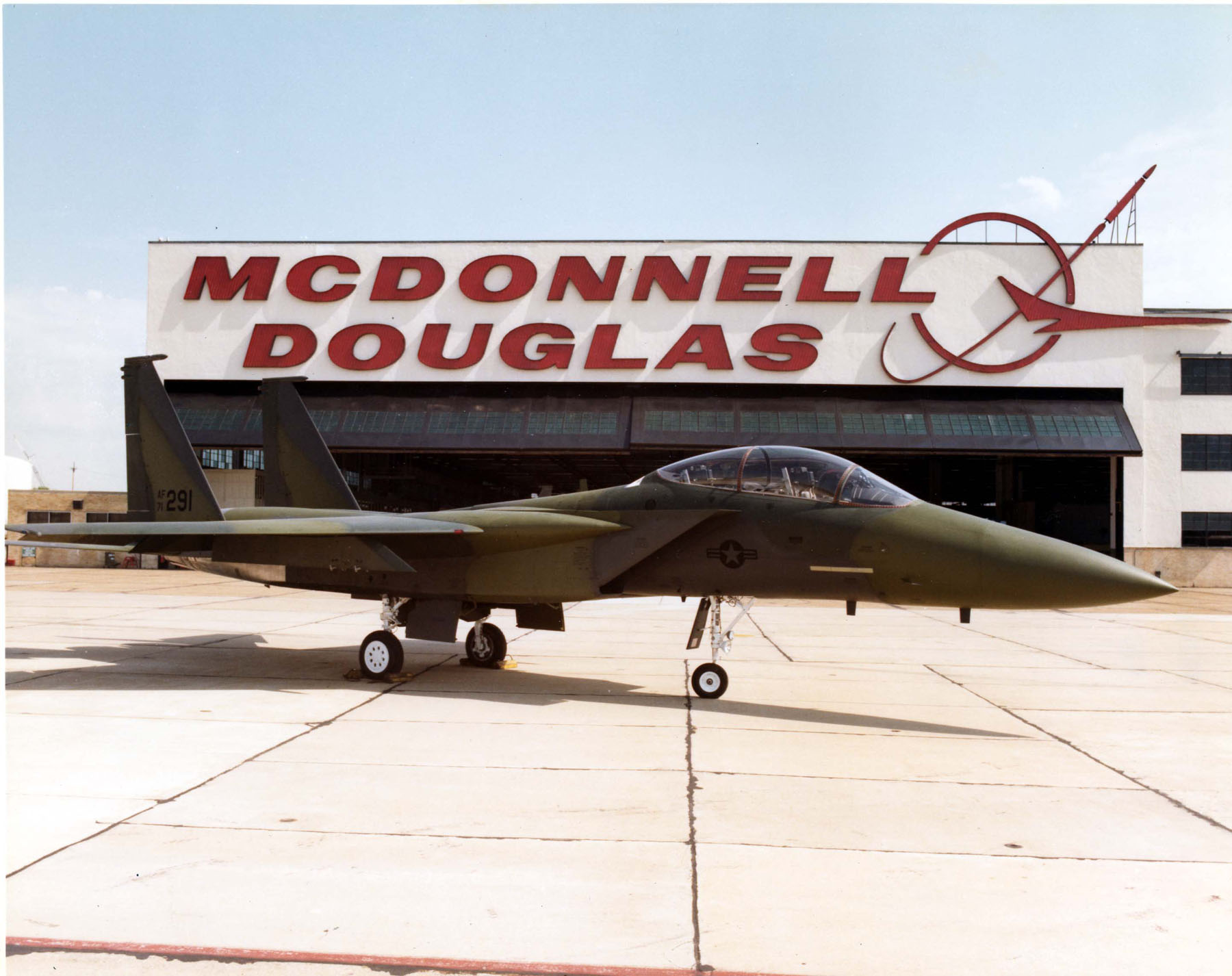
The second TF-15A, serial 71-0291, used as an F-15E demonstrator

Though the two aircraft were competing for the same role, they were fairly different in design approach. The original F-15E Strike Eagle prototype was a modified F-15B Eagle two-seat trainer with the back seat station modified to support ground-attack instruments. It also had major structural changes that allowed it to carry more weight, and improved its strike capabilities. The single-engine F-16XL had many structural and aerodynamic differences from the original F-16 Fighting Falcon, which resulted in a promising design. Its radically redesigned cranked-delta wing greatly boosted lift and control, and allowed for greater fuel capacity and loads, which increased range and capabilities. If selected, the single-seat and two-seat versions were to be designated F-16E and F-16F, respectively. Despite its advantages, the F-16XL would have required much more effort, time and money to put into full production. Additionally, the Strike Eagle had two engines, which gave it more thrust and capacity to carry more weapons and/or armor, as well as engine redundancy. This was a deciding factor in choosing the F-15E because redundancy is useful for an aircraft whose mission involves operating within the reach of anti-aircraft artillery and surface-to-air missiles, in addition to the standard threats of fighter aircraft and interceptors.

On 24 February 1984, the USAF chose the F-15E; key factors in the decision were the F-15E's lower development costs compared to the F-16XL (US$270 million versus US$470 million), a belief that the F-15E had future growth potential, and possessing twin-engine redundancy. The USAF was initially expected to procure 400 aircraft, a figure later revised to 392. The two F-16XLs were returned to the USAF and placed in storage at Edwards Air Force Base, Mojave, California.
