= Harry Hillaker =

American aeronautical engineer (1919-2009)

- Born: 9 May 1919; Flint, Michigan, US
- Died: 8 February 2009 (aged 89)
- Education: University of Michigan-Flint
- Occupation: Aeronautical engineer
- Engineering career
- Discipline: Aeronautical engineering
- Employer(s): Consolidated Aircraft; Convair; General Dynamics
- Projects: F-16 Fighting Falcon

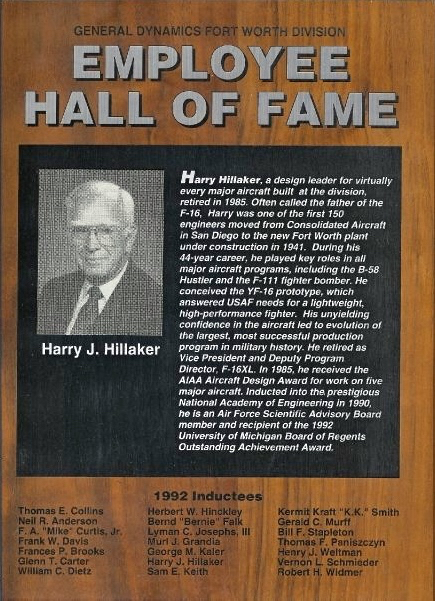
Hillaker's commemorative plaque in the General Dynamics Employee Hall of Fame, including his biography.

Harry James Hillaker (9 May 1919 – 8 February 2009) was an American aeronautical engineer, who is credited as the main designer and originator of the F-16 Fighting Falcon aircraft.

== Biography ==
Harry Hillaker was born on 9 May 1919 in Flint, Michigan, and attended Flint Northern High School.

In 1939, Hillaker attended the College of Engineering at University of Michigan, where he had studied Aeronautical Engineering.

=== Consolidated Aircraft/Convair ===
In 1941, Hillaker began his career at Consolidated Aircraft in San Diego, which, in 1943, merged with Vultee Aircraft to become Convair. Whilst at Convair, Hillaker worked on the Convair B-36 Peacemaker and the Convair B-58 Hustler.

=== Marriage ===
On 2 October 1943, Hillaker married Betty Jo Devaney of Fort Worth. He would go on to have six children with his wife, who died in 2017.

=== General Dynamics ===
In 1953 Convair was bought by General Dynamics, and in 1965 they decided to build all aircraft at Fort Worth, Texas under the General Dynamics name. At General Dynamics, Hillaker worked on the F-111

In the 1960s, Hillaker met and consulted with a group of US Air Force officers and defence analysts who became known as the Fighter Mafia due to their advocacy for simple, lightweight and maneuverable fighters, which eventually resulted in the Lightweight Fighter program. Hillaker became the chief project engineer for the Model 401, General Dynamics' submission to this program. On 8 January 1974, the prototype, now designated YF-16, arrived at Edwards Air Force Base in California, and took to the air on 2 February 1974, flown by Phil Oestricher. In January 1975, the YF-16 was selected as the winner of a flyoff competition against the Northrop YF-17, going into production as the F-16 Fighting Falcon. The F-16 went on to become one of the most successful fighters in history, with over 4.600 produced by 2024, some 2,800 of which are still in service, and production continuing for export.

Hillaker retired in 1985, but continued to consult for the US Air Force and the aerospace industry. He was inducted into the US National Academy of Engineering in 1990, and spent two terms as chairman of the Aerospace Vehicles Panel of the Air Force's Scientific Advisory Board.

=== Death ===
Harry Hillaker died on Sunday, 8 February 2009 in Texas. He was 89 years old.

== See also ==
- Mikhail Simonov, designer of the Sukhoi Su-27
- Robert H. Widmer, designer of the F-111
