= Thomas P. Christie =

American defense analyst

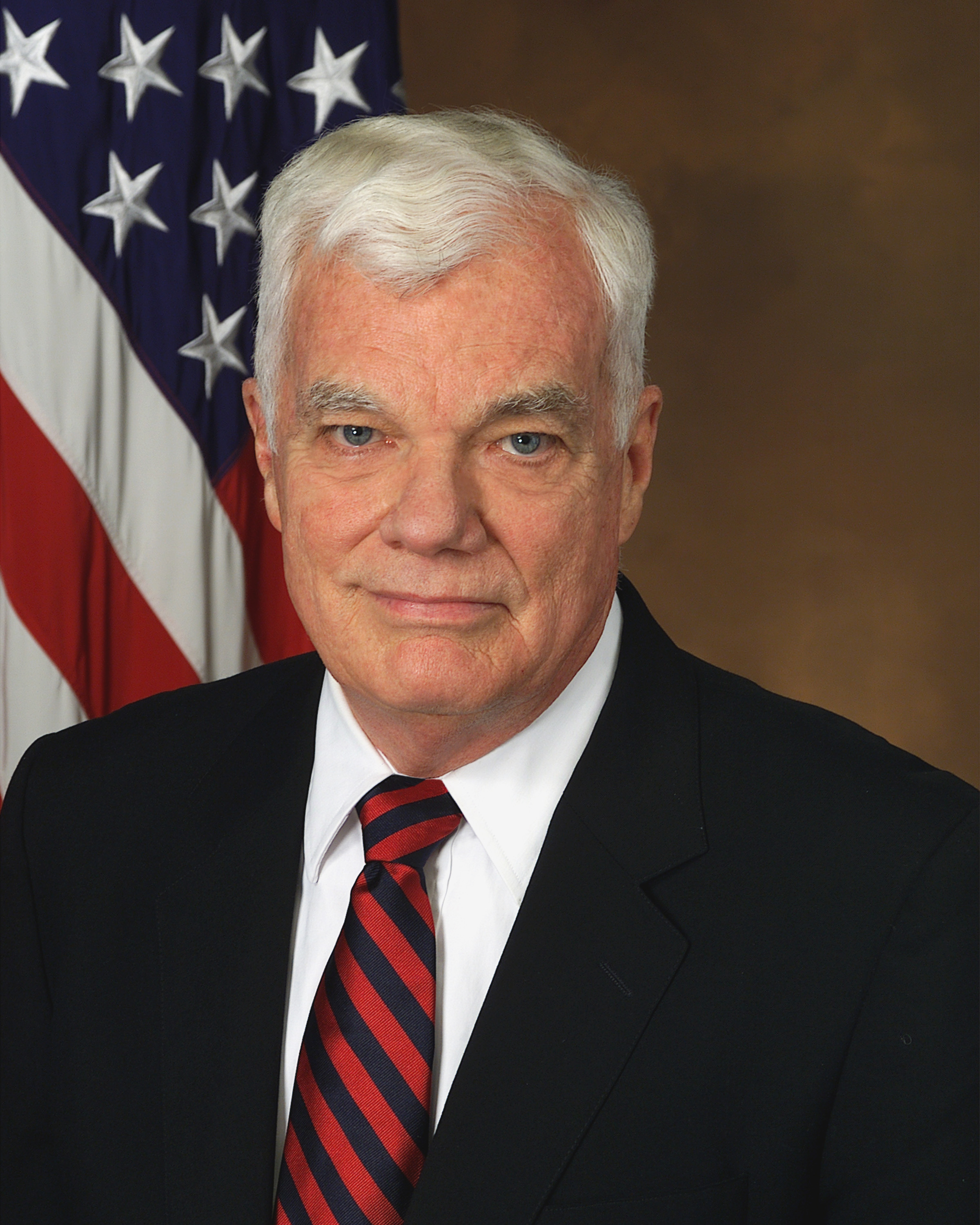
Thomas P. Christie as director of Operational Test and Evaluation in August 2001.

Thomas Philip Christie (born May 28, 1934 in Pensacola, Florida) is an American defense analyst who worked for the U.S. government.

Christie graduated from Spring Hill College with a B.S. degree in mathematics in May 1955 and from New York University with an M.S. degree in applied mathematics in September 1962.

Christie served for nine years as director of the operational evaluation division (OED) at the Institute for Defense Analyses, a federally funded research and development center. Christie was responsible for independent analyses of more than two hundred major test and evaluation programs and was also involved in weapons testing.

Christie became director of Operational Test and Evaluation in June 2001.

== Energy–maneuverability theory ==
Christie is often associated with John Boyd and other associates of Boyd who were critical of U.S. defense policies. While working with Boyd at Eglin AFB, Christie was deeply involved with the development of the Energy-Maneuverability theory of aerial combat. The work on this theory was not officially sanctioned and Christie and Boyd resorted to "stealing" computer time to compare the performance of U.S. and Soviet military aircraft which resulted in the publication of a two volume report in 1964. Despite the manner in which the Energy-Maneuverability theory was developed, it was accepted by the U.S. military and influenced the design of the successful F-15, F-16 and F-18 fighters.

== Awards ==
Over the years, Christie has received numerous awards and citations including the Presidential Rank Award of Distinguished Executive (1983); the Presidential Rank Award of Meritorious Executive (two awards - 1980 and 1987); the Department of Defense Distinguished Civilian Service Award (four awards – 1979, 1981, 1983, and 1989); and the Air Force Scientific Achievement Award (two awards – 1965 and 1970).
