= Energy–maneuverability theory =

Model of aircraft performance

Energy–maneuverability theory is a model of aircraft performance. It was developed by Col. John Boyd, a fighter pilot, and Thomas P. Christie, a mathematician with the United States Air Force, and is useful in describing an aircraft's performance as the total of kinetic and potential energies or aircraft specific energy. It relates the thrust, weight, aerodynamic drag, wing area, and other flight characteristics of an aircraft into a quantitative model. This enables the combat capabilities of various aircraft or prospective design trade-offs to be predicted and compared.

== Formula ==
All of these aspects of airplane performance are compressed into a single value by the following formula:

$$\begin{array}{rcl}
P_S & = & V \left ( \frac{T-D}{W} \right ) \\
\\
V   & = & \text{Velocity } \\
T   & = & \text{Thrust} \\
D   & = & \text{Drag} \\
W   & = & \text{Weight}
\end{array}$$

This represents an aircraft's specific excess power and is directly proportional to the potential climb rate (or sink rate) of the aircraft or equivalently its net energy generation (or loss).

Note however that this can apply during any kind of maneuver, not simply a constant speed climb. Often this is expressed in the form of an energy-maneuverability contour plot with speed on the X axis and turn rate on the Y axis. The diagram is often referred to as an E-M diagram. At any point on the E-M diagram, an aircraft has a corresponding speed, turn rate, turn radius, g load, and specific excess power. An aircraft with positive specific excess power can change a performance parameter without sacrificing another. For example, it could increase g load or reduce turn radius without sacrificing altitude.

The E-M diagram also simplifies aircraft comparisons. If at a given point on the diagram, an aircraft has greater specific excess power than another aircraft operating at the same parameters, then it will have an energy advantage in that condition. If those conditions are maintained, then the aircraft with lower specific excess power will be limited in maneuver options, while the other will maintain a broader range of its maneuver envelope.

Note however that certain maneuvers actively benefit an aircraft's capabilities from low or negative specific excess power. Particularly bleeding speed, reducing or reversing thrust, or post-stall maneuvers in order to make tighter turns or improve nose authority.

== History ==
John Boyd, a U.S. jet fighter pilot in the Korean War, began developing the theory in the early 1960s. He teamed with mathematician Thomas Christie at Eglin Air Force Base to use the base's high-speed computer to compare the performance envelopes of U.S. and Soviet aircraft from the Korean and Vietnam Wars. They completed a two-volume report on their studies in 1964. Energy Maneuverability came to be accepted within the U.S. Air Force and brought about improvements in the requirements for the F-15 Eagle and later the F-16 Fighting Falcon fighters.

== See also ==
- Index of aviation articles
- Lagrangian mechanics
