= List of military aircraft of Sweden =

This is a list of Swedish military aircraft since its start. It is not guaranteed to be up-to-date or to be accurate, or complete. Aircraft still in service noted.

== Early aircraft ==
=== Early balloons of the Army and Navy ===
| Designation | Number Used | Year Entered Service | Info |
| Fästningsballong 1898 | 1 | 1898 | First Swedish military aircraft |
| Drakballong m/09 | 5 | 1909 | - |
| Kronan 1909 | 1 | 1909 | – |
| Drakballong typ Ä | 1 | – | - |
| Fältballong m/23 | 1 | 1923 | - |
| Kulballong m/23 | 1 | 1923 | - |
| Fältballong 1926 | 1 | 1926 | - |

=== Early Navy ===
(The aviation corps became a separate organization in 1915.)

| Aircraft | # Used | Year |
| Nyrop 2 (Bleriot XI) (N:r 1) | 1 | 1911–1913, 1916 |
| Nieuport IV.M | 1 | 1913–1918 |
| Donnet-Leveque | 2 | 1913–1918 |
| Farman HF.23 | 2 | 1913–1917 |
| SW 11 (Farman HF 23) | 7 | 1914–1920 |
| Thulin B | 2 | 1915–1917 |
| TDS Farman HF 23 | 2 | 1917–1920 |
| Thulin G | 5 | 1917–1922 |
| SW 17 (SAF H-2) | 4, did not enter service | |
| Thulin GA | 2 | 1919–1921 |
| Friedrichshafen FF.33L | 2 | 1918–1920 |
| Friedrichshafen FF.33E | 3 | 1918–1929 |
| Friedrichshafen FF.49C | 2 | 1919–1924 |
| Sablatnig FF.49C | 2 | 1919–1926 |
| TDS Friedrichshafen FF.33 | 5 | 1921–1929 |
| Macchi M.8 | 1 | 1919–1922 |
| Savoia S.13 | 4 | 1919–1924 |
| Supermarine Channel II | 1 | 1921–1922 |
| Fairey IIID | 1 | 1924–1925 |
| Caspar S.I (Heinkel HE 1) | 4 | 1921–1929 |
| Heinkel HE 1 | 8 | 1923–1929 |
| Heinkel S.II | 5 | 1924–1934 |
| Heinkel HE 4 | 1 | 1926–1931 |
| Heinkel HD 14 | did not enter service | |
| Albatros B.IIa | 5 | 1920–1929 |
| Avro 504K | 5 | 1924–1928 |
| LVG C.VI | 2 | 1921–1923 |
| Heinkel HE 3 | 2 | 1925–1927 |

=== Early Army ===
(The aviation corps became a separate organization in 1915.)

| Des. | Aircraft | # Used | Year |
| - | Nieuport IV.G | 2 | 1912–1918 |
| - | Bleriot XI | 6 | 1914–1916 |
| - | Morane-Saulnier MS.3 | 1 | 1914–1918 |
| - | Fjällbäck Bastarden | 1 | 1914–1916 |
| - | Thulin D | 2 | 1915–1918 |
| - | Thulin K | 2 | 1917–1919 |
| - | SW 15 | 3 | 1917–1921 |
| B 1 | Breguet C.U-1 | 1 | 1912–1916 |
| B 2 | Farman HF.20 | 1 | 1913–1915 |
| - | Farman HF 22/SW 10 | 4 | 1914–1916 |
| Ö 2 | Albatros B.II/SW 12/SAF 3/NAB 9 | 29 | 1914–1929 |
| - | Thulin E | 5 | 1916–1920 |
| - | Thulin L | 9 | 1916–1920 |
| - | Thulin FA | 7 | 1918–1921 |
| - | FVM/SW SW 16 | 1 | 1918–1919 |
| S 18 | FVM S 18 | 15 | 1919–1925 |
| - | Breguet 14 | 1 | 1919–1922 |
| - | Phönix C.I Dront | 27 | 1919–1932 |
| - | FVM Albatros 120 | 10 | 1920–1929 |
| - | FVM Albatros 160 | 12 | 1928–1935 |
| S 21 | FVM S 21 | 10 | 1922–1932 |
| - | Bristol F.2 Fighter | 1 | 1924–1930 |
| - | Fiat BR | 2 | 1924–1932 |
| - | Fiat BR.I | 3 | 1925–1937 |
| - | AEG G.V | 6 | 1918–1922 |
| – | Gloster Grouse | 1 | 1926–1929 |
| – | Avro 504N | 1 | 1926–1928 |
| – | Heinkel HD 35 | 1 | 1926–1929 |
| – | Fokker D.IV | 4 | 1918–1922 |
| – | FVM Triplanet | 1 | 1918–1919 |
| - | FVM Tummelisa | 16 | 1918–1935 |
| - | Phönix D.II | 30 | 1920-193? |
| - | Phönix D.III | 1 | 1920–1921 |
| - | Fokker D.VII | 1 | 1920–1922 |
| - | Macchi M.7 | 4 | 1921–1927 |
| J 23 | FVM J 23 | 5 | 1923–1926 |
| J 24 | FVM J 24 | 1 | 1925–1931 |
| - | Armstrong Whitworth Siskin | 1 | 1925–1926 |
| - | Nieuport-Delage NiD 29 C.1 | 10 | 1926–1930 |

== Air Force (1926–40) ==
Created in July of 1926.

Designations Key
| Abbrev. Designation | Name | Translation |
| J | Jakt | Fighter |
| A | Attack | Ground attack |
| B | Bomb | Bomber |
| T | Torped | Torpedo bomber |
| S | Spaning | Reconnaissance |
| Sk | Skol | Trainer |
| Ö | Övning | Advanced trainer |
| Tp | Transport | Transport |
| Hkp | Helikopter | Helicopter |
| P | Prov | Experimental/prototype |
| Fpl | Flygplan | Airplane |

Later XX implies later redesignation.

=== Fighters (Jakt) ===
| Aircraft | Des. | Role | # Used | Year | Notes |
| Bristol Bulldog II/IIA | J 7 | fighter | 11 | 1930–1940 | 1939, two to Finland |
| Fiat CR.42bis Falco | J 11 | fighter | 72 | 1940–1945 (1946) | - |
| Fokker C.Vd | J 3 | fighter | 15 | 1927–1946 | S 6 after 1931, some built by CFM |
| Gloster Gladiator I & II | J 8 | fighter | 55 | 1937–1945 | some used in Finland |
| Heinkel HD 19 | J 4 | fighter | 6 | 1928–1937 | built by Svenska Aero |
| Nieuport-Delage NiD 29 C.1 | J 2 | fighter | 10 | 1925–1930 | |
| Phönix D.III | J 1 | fighter | 12 | 1919–1933 | Some built by FMV |
| Reggiane Re.2000 | J 12 | fighter | 60 | 1941–1946 | later J20 |
| Seversky/Republic EP-1 | J 9 | fighter | 60 | 1940–1951 | some modified |
| Svenska Aero Jaktfalken | J 5 | fighter | 1 | 1930–1933 | |
| Svenska Aero Jaktfalk I & II | J 6 | fighter | 17 | 1930–1941 | three to Finland |
| Vultee V-49C Vanguard | J 10 | fighter | - | - | did not enter service |

=== Bombers (Bomb), torpedo bombers (Torped) and ground attack (Attack) ===
| Aircraft | Des. | Role | # Used | Year | Notes |
| Fiat B.R. | B 1 | bomber | 3 | 1924–1932 | |
| Fiat B.R.I | B 2 | bomber | 2 | 1925–1937 | |
| Fokker G.Ib | B 7 | bomber | - | - | did not enter service |
| Hawker Hart | B 4 | bomber | 45 | 1936–1947 | formerly S 7, many built by ASJA/CVM/Götaverken, 5 used in Finland |
| Heinkel HD 16 | T 1 | torpedo bomber | 2 | 1928–1939 | - |
| Heinkel He 115A-2 | T 2 | torpedo bomber | 12 | 1939–1948 | - |
| Junkers Ju 86K | B 3 | bomber | 87 | 1936–1958 | Some used as torpedo bombers, some built by SAAB |
| Northrop 8A-1 | B 5 | bomber | 103 | 1938–1950 | most built by SAAB |
| FMV/Phoenix C.I | A 1 | attack | 11 | 1921–1935 | 2 ex army |
| Republic 2PA | B 6 | bomber | 2 | 1940–1953 | orders not received |
| SAAB L 10 | B 8 | bomber | - | - | redesignated B 17 |

=== Reconnaissance (Spaning) ===
| Aircraft | Des. | Role | # Used | Year | Notes |
| Breguet 694 | S 10 | reconnaissance | - | - | did not enter service |
| Centrala Verkstaden Malmslätt S 21/S 25 | S 1 | reconnaissance | 16 | 1925–1932 | formerly army air. |
| Dornier Do 215 | S 11 | reconnaissance | - | - | did not enter service |
| Fieseler Fi 156 Storch | S 14 | reconnaissance | 26 | 1938–1960 | 6 added in 1948 |
| Fokker C.VD & E | S 6 | reconnaissance | 48 | 1927–1945 | formerly J 3s, built by CVM. |
| Fokker G.I | S 13 | reconnaissance | - | - | did not enter service |
| Hawker Hart | S 7 | reconnaissance | 10 | 1934–1937 | redesignated B 4 in 1937, some built by ASJA and CVM |
| Hawker Osprey | S 9 | reconnaissance | 6 | 1934–1945 | - |
| Heinkel He 4 | S 4 | reconnaissance | 1 | 1925–1931 | formerly navy air. |
| Heinkel He 5 | S 5 | reconnaissance | 40 | 1927–1945 | some built by Svenska Aero/CFV/CVV |
| Heinkel S.I | S 2 | reconnaissance | 8 | 1923–1929 | formerly navy air, built by Caspar, Svenska Aero and TDS |
| Heinkel S.II | S 3 | reconnaissance | 6 | 1924–1934 | formerly navy air, built by Svenska Aero and CFS |
| Heinkel He 114B-1 | S 12 | reconnaissance | 12 | 1941–1947 | - |
| Saab 17 | S 15 | reconnaissance | - | - | redesignated S 17 |
| Svenska Aero SA-15 | S 8 | reconnaissance | - | - | did not enter service |

=== Transport (Transport) ===
| Aircraft | Des. | Role | # Used | Year | Notes |
| Junkers F.13fe/F.13de | Trp 1 | transport | 3 | 1928–1946 | built by Junkers' Sweden subsidiary Flygindustri |
| Junkers W.33g | Trp 2 | transport | 1 | 1933–1935 | built by Flygindustri |
| Junkers W.34h | Trp 2A | transport | 2 | 1933–1945 | - |
| de Havilland DH.90 Dragonfly | Trp 3 | transport | 1 | 1936–1942 | - |
| Beechcraft Model 18R | Trp 4 | transport | 1 | 1940–1953 | - |
| Junkers Ju 52/3m ci & Ju 52/3m vai | Tp 5 | transport | 5 | 1940–1945 | leased |
| Fairchild 24 | Tp 6 | transport | 1 | 1940–1941 | leased |
| Miles M 3A Falcon Major | Tp 7 | transport | 1 | 1940–1944 | |
| Waco UIC | Tp 8 | transport | 3 | 1940-1940 | leased |
| Waco ZQC-6 | Tp 8A | transport | 1 | 1940–? | - |
| ASJA Viking II | Trp 9 | transport | - | - | did not enter service |
| Junkers Ju 86Z-7 | Tp 9 | transport | 1 | 1940–? | - |
| Fokker F.VIII | Tp 10 | transport | 1 | 1942–1944 | - |
| Götaverken GV 38 | n/a | transport | 6 | 1941–1945 | leased |
| RWD 13 | Tp 11 | transport | 1 | 1939–1951 | |

=== Trainers (Skol) and advanced trainers (Övning) ===
| Aircraft | Des. | Role | # Used | Year | Notes |
| Albatros B.II/ B.IIa/160 | Sk 1 & Ö 2 | trainer | 23 | 1920–1935 | ex army and ex navy, some built by FVM |
| ASJA L2 | Ö 9 | trainer (advanced) | 2 | 1932–1940 | - |
| Avro 504K | Sk 3 | trainer | 5 | 1924–1928 | ex navy |
| Bristol F.2B | Ö 6 | trainer (advanced) | 1 | 1924–1934 | ex army |
| de Havilland DH.60T Moth Trainer | Sk 9 | trainer | 10 | 1931–1936 | - |
| de Havilland DH.60X/M Cirrus/Gipsy Moth | Sk 7 | trainer | 2 | 1928–1936 | - |
| De Havilland DH.82 Tiger Moth | Sk 11 | trainer | 36 | 1932–1952 | some built by ASJA |
| Focke-Wulf Fw 44J Stieglitz | Sk 12 | trainer | 85 | 1936–1946 | some built by ASJA/CVV |
| Friedrichshafen FF 33J | Sk 2 | trainer | 4 | 1918–1929 | ex navy, built by TDS |
| FVM Ö1 Tummelisa | Ö 1 | trainer (advanced) | 24 | 1919–1935 | ex army |
| Gloster Grouse Mk II | Ö 3 | trainer (advanced) | 1 | 1926–1929 | ex army |
| Heinkel HD 24 | Sk 4 | trainer | 9 | 1926–1939 | most built by Svenska Aero |
| Heinkel HD 35 | Sk 5 | trainer | 1 | 1925–1929 | ex army |
| Heinkel HD 36 | Sk 6 | trainer | 21 | 1927–1943 | most built by CFM |
| Klemm Kl 35 | Sk 15 | trainer | 101 | 1939–1944 | 27 leased |
| North American NA-16-4M | Sk 14 | trainer | 137 | 1937–1949 | Some built by Saab, 3 modified with tricycle gear |
| Phönix C.I Dront | Ö 4 & Ö 5 | trainer (advanced) | 18 | 1928–1932 | 16 ex army, built by FVM |
| Raab-Katzenstein RK-26 Tigerschwalbe | Sk 10 | trainer | 25 | 1932–1942, 1945 | built by ASJA |
| Svenska Aero SA-10 Piraten | Ö 7 | trainer (advanced) | 1 | 1928–1937 | |
| Svenska Aero SA-12 Skolfalken | Sk 8 | trainer | 1 | 1929–1938 | - |
| Svenska Aero SA-13 Övningsfalken | Ö 8 | trainer (advanced) | 1 | 1930–1937 | |
| TB | Ö 10 | trainer (advanced) | - | - | - |

=== Experimental/prototype/projects (Prov) ===
| Aircraft | Des. | Role | # Used | Year | Notes |
| P 1 | Sparmann S-1A | prototype | 10 | 1934–1945 | - |
| P 2 | Focke-Wulf Fw 44 | trainer | 2 | 1936–?? | redesignated Sk 12 in 1937 |
| P 3 | Sparmann E4 | prototype fighter | - | - | did not enter service |
| P 4 | Fieseler Fi 156K-1 | reconnaissance | 2 | 1938-19?? | redesignated S 14 in 1940 |
| P 5 | Handley Page Hampden Mk.I | bomber | 1 | 1938–1945 | – |
| P 6 | Focke-Wulf Fw 58 Weihe | trainer | 4 | 1938–1949, 1957 | mapping agency aircraft, AF use until 1944 |
| P 7 | Saab L 10 (Saab B 17) | bomber prototype | 2 | 1943–1944 | |
| P 8 | Saab L 11 (Saab B 18) | bomber prototype | 2 | 1943–45 | |
| P 8A | ASJA G.1 | bomber project | - | - | |
| P 8B | Götaverken GP.8 | - | - | | |
| P 9A | Saab J 19/L 12 | fighter project | - | - | not built |
| P 9B | Götaverken GP.9 | fighter project | - | - | - |

=== Undesignated/Miscellaneous ===
Not used by air force

| Aircraft | # Used | Year | Info |
| FVM J 24B | 1 | 1925–31 | Ex army |
| Heinkel He 3 | 1 | 1925–27 | Ex navy |
| Macchi M.7 | 1 | 1921–27 | Ex army |
| Armstrong Whitworth Siskin IIA | 1 | 1925–26 | Ex army |
| Avro 504N | 1 | 19??–27 | Ex army |

=== Gliders ===
- G = Glidflygplan "glider"
- Se = Segelflygplan, "soarer" (sailplane),
- Lg = Lastglidare, "transport glider"

| Des. | Aircraft | # Used | Year | Info |
| G 101 | AB Flygindustri Zögling SG-38 | 40 | 1942–53 | - |
| Se 102 | AB Flygplan Schneider Grunau Baby IIB-2 | 31 | 1942–61 | - |
| Se 103 | AB Flygplan DFS Kranich B-1 | 30 | 1943–52 | - |
| Se 104 | AB Flygindustri DFS Weihe | 19 | 1943–54 | - |
| Lg 105 | AB Flygindustri Fi 3 | 6 | 1944–44 | - |

== Post-1940 designation system ==
(Aircraft still in service have a light green background.)

=== Main list ===
| Des. | Aircraft | # Used | Year | Info |
| S 16A | Caproni Ca.313 | 66 | 1940–1945 | - |
| Tp 16A | Caproni Ca.313 | 2 | 1941–1946 | - |
| B 16A | Caproni Ca.313 | 30 | 1940–1943 | - |
| T 16A | Caproni Ca.313 | 14 | 1941–1942 | - |
| S 16B | Caproni Ca.313 | 14 | 1942–1945 | - |
| B 17A | Saab 17 | 132 | 1943–1948 | - |
| B 17B | Saab 17 | 54 | 1942–1945 | - |
| S 17BL | Saab 17 | 64 | 1942–1949 | - |
| S 17BS | Saab 17 | 56 | 1942–1949 | - |
| B 17C | Saab 17 | 77 | 1943–1947 | - |
| B 18A | Saab 18 | 62 | 1944–1947 | - |
| S 18A | Saab 18 | 55 | 1946–1959 | - |
| B 18B | Saab 18 | 120 | 1945–1958 | - |
| T 18B | Saab 18 | 62 | 1947–1957 | - |
| J 19 | Saab L 12 | – | – | - |
| J 20 | Reggiane Re.2000 | 60 | 1941–1945 | - |
| J 21A-1 | Saab 21 | 54 | 1946–1949 | - |
| J 21A-2 | Saab 21 | 124 | 1946–1953 | - |
| J 21B | Saab 21 | – | – | RR Griffon variant |
| A 21A-3 | Saab 21 | 119 | 1947–1954 | - |
| A 21RA | Saab 21R | 29 | 1949–1953 | J 21R first year |
| A 21RB | Saab 21R | 30 | 1950–1956 | - |
| P 22 | FFVS 22 | 2 | 1942–1943 | Prototypes |
| J 22-1 | FFVS 22 | 120 | 1943–1952 | - |
| J 22-2 | FFVS 22 | 78 | 1945–1952 | - |
| S 22-3 | FFVS 22 | 9 | 1946–1947 | - |
| J 23 | Saab L 23 | - | – | alt proj. for J 21 |
| J 24 | Saab L 24 (Also B 24) | – | - | - |
| Tp 24 | Dornier 24T-1 | 1 | 1945–1951 | - |
| Sk 25 | Bücker Bü 181B Bestmann | 121 | 1945–1952 | - |
| Sk 26 | Saab 26 | – | – | upgraded Sk 14 |
| S/B 26 | See B 7 and S 13 | – | – | Type 26 left for Mustang |
| J 26 | North American P-51D Mustang | 161 | 1945–1954 | 2 P-51B's |
| S 26 | P-51D Mustang | 17 | 1949–1954 | All of them modified J 26 |
| J 27 | Saab L 27 | – | – | – |
| Sk 16A | North American Harvard IIb | 145 | 1947–1972 | - |
| Sk 16B | North American T-6A, T-6B, SNJ-3, SNJ-4 | 106 | 1952–1958 | – |
| Sk 16C | SNJ-2 | 6 | 1952–1958 | - |
| Tp 45 | Beechcraft 18S, C-45A | 1 | 1948–1956 | - |
| Tp 45A | Beechcraft 18S, C-45B | 1 | 1948–1958 | - |
| Tp 46 | de Havilland DH.104 Dove | 1 | 1948–1966 | - |
| Tp 47 | Consolidated PBY-5A Catalina | 3 | 1947–1966 | - |
| J 28A | de Havilland DH.100 Vampire Mk 1 | 70 | 1946–1955 | |
| J 28B | de Havilland DH.100 Vampire FB 50 | 310 | 1949–1967 | |
| J 28C, C-2, C-3 | de Havilland DH.115 Vampire T 55 Trainer | 57 | 1953–1968 | - |
| Tp 78 | Noorduyn Norseman | 3 | 1949–1959 | - |
| Tp 79 | Douglas DC-3 | 8 | 1949–1983 | - |
| Tp 80 | Avro Lancaster | 1 | 1950–1956 | Jet engine test platform |
| Tp 81 | Grumman Goose | 1 | 1951–1962 | - |
| Tp 82 | Vickers Varsity | 1 | 1953–1973 | Developed from the Vickers VC.1 Viking |
| Tp 83 | Percival Pembroke | 18 | 1954–1976 | - |
| Tp 91 | Saab 91A Safir | 10 | 1947–1960 | - |
| Sk 50B | Saab 91B Safir | 76 | 1952–1990 | Only 75 into active service |
| Sk 50C | Saab 91C Safir | 14 | 1960–1992 | - |
| Tp 52 | English Electric Canberra | 2 | 1959–1974 | Elint/Radar development |
| Tp 55 | de Havilland Canada DHC-4 Caribou | 1 | 1964–1965 | evaluation only, leased. |
| J 29A | Saab Tunnan | 224 | 1951–1963, 1965 | - |
| J 29B | Saab Tunnan | 361 | 1953–1957 | Also known as A 29B |
| S 29C | Saab Tunnan- | 76 | 1954–1970 | rebuilt to -E's wing 1955–1956 |
| J 29E | Saab Tunnan | 29 | 1954–1958 | Saab 29B's rebuilt into 29Fs |
| J 29F | Saab Tunnan | 308 | 1955–1976 | (ex J29B and J29E) |
| J 30 | de Havilland Mosquito NF.Mk 19 | 60 | 1948–1953 | Night fighter |
| S 31 | Supermarine Spitfire PR Mk.19 | 50 | 1948–1955 | - |
| A 32A | Saab Lansen | 287 | 1955–1978 | - |
| J 32B | Saab Lansen | 118 | 1958–1973 | 1997 reused, see below |
| J 32B | Saab Lansen | 8 | 1997–1999 | - |
| S 32C | Saab Lansen | 44 | 1958–1978 | - |
| J 32D | Saab Lansen | 6 | 1972–1997 | Target towing, ex J 32B |
| J 32E | Saab Lansen | 15 | 1972–1997 | ECM |
| J 33 | de Havilland Venom DH.112 Venom | 60 | 1953–1960 | Night fighter |
| J 34 | Hawker Hunter Mk 50 | 120 | 1955–1969 | - |
| J 35A | Saab 35 Draken | 90 | 1960–1976 | – |
| J 35B | Saab 35 Draken | 73 | 1962–1973 | - |
| Sk 35C | Saab 35 Draken | 25 | 1962–1998 | Rebuilt J 35A fighters |
| J 35D | Saab 35 Draken | 120 | 1964–1984 | – |
| S 35E | Saab 35 Draken | 59 | 1965–1979 | (28 were rebuilt J 35D:s) |
| J 35F | Saab 35 Draken | 230 | 1969–1989 | F1 w/o IRST, F2 with IRST |
| J 35J | Saab 35 Draken | 66 | 1987–1998 | Rebuilt F:s |
| FPL 801 | Malmö MFI-9B Mil-trainer | 10 | 1966–68 | evaluation only, leased. |
| A 36 | Saab 36 | – | 1950s | planned nuclear bomber |
| SK 60A | Saab 105 | 150 | 1967–2024 | – |
| SK 60B | Saab 105 | 46 | 1970–2024 | Rebuilt SK 60A |
| SK 60C | Saab 105 | 30 | 1970–2024 | Rebuilt SK 60B |
| SK 60D | Saab 105 | – | – | Rebuilt, civilian radio/nav |
| SK 60E | Saab 105 | - | - | Rebuilt, civilian radio/nav |
| SK 61A | Scottish Aviation Bulldog | 52 | 1972–2001 | |
| SK 61B | Scottish Aviation Bulldog | 6 | - | - |
| SK 61C | Scottish Aviation Bulldog | 20 | - | Army FPL 61C transferred to Air Force |
| SK 61D | Scottish Aviation Bulldog | - | - | - |
| SK 61E | Scottish Aviation Bulldog | - | - | - |
| TP 84A | Lockheed C-130H Hercules | 1 | 1965– | C-130E upgraded to -H |
| TP 84B | Lockheed C-130H Hercules | 1 | - | C-130E upgraded to -H |
| TP 84C | Lockheed C-130H Hercules | 1 | - | - |
| TP 84D | Lockheed C-130H Hercules | 5 | - | - |
| TP 85 | Sud Aviation Caravelle | 2 | 1971–1998 | ELINT |
| AJ 37 | Saab 37 Viggen | 108 | 1971–1998 | - |
| SK 37 | Saab 37 Viggen | 17 | 1973–2005 | - |
| SK 37E | Saab 37 Viggen | 10 | 1999–2005 | 10 SK 37 converted to ECM/training |
| SH 37 | Saab 37 Viggen | 27 | 1975–1998 | maritime surveillance |
| SF 37 | Saab 37 Viggen | 28 | 1977–2003 | photo reconnaissance |
| JA 37 | Saab 37 Viggen | 149 | 1979–2005 | - |
| AJS 37 | Saab AJ 37 Viggen | 115 | 1992–2000 | Modified AJ/SH/SF's |
| AJSH 37 | Saab SH 37 Viggen | – | 1992–2005 | - |
| AJSF 37 | Saab SF 37 Viggen | – | 1992–2005 | - |
| A 38/SK 38 | Saab 38 | – | – | Cancelled |
| TP 86 | North American Sabreliner | 2 | 1981– | system trials |
| TP 87 | Cessna 404 | 3 | 1982–1989 | VIP |
| TP 88 | Fairchild Swearingen Metro III | 1 | 1984–1986 | VIP |
| TP 88B | Fairchild Swearingen Metro/Merlin IV C | 1 | 1986–1993 | VIP |
| TP 88C | Fairchild Swearingen Metro III | 1 | 1987– | Erieye/FS-890 AEW trials |
| TP 101 | Beech 200 Super King Air | 3 | 1988– | - |
| TP 101B | Beech 200 Super King Air | 1 | - | - |
| TP 100A | Saab 340B | 1 | 1990– | VIP, Open Skies |
| S 100B | Saab 340 AEW Argus | 6 | 1994– | AEW |
| TP 100C | Saab 340B | 2 | - | Transport |
| S 100D | Saab 340 AEW Argus | 2 | - | AEW&C, rebuilt S 100B |
| TP 102A | Gulfstream IV | 1 | 1992– | VIP |
| S 102B | Gulfstream IV-SP Korpen | 2 | 1995– | ELINT, Hugin, Munin |
| TP 102C | Gulfstream IV-SP | 1 | 2000– | VIP |
| TP 102D | Gulfstream G550 | 1 | 2011– | VIP |
| TP 54 | Piper PA-31-350 Navajo | 1 | 1993– | – |
| JAS 39A | Saab JAS 39 Gripen | 106 | 1996– | - |
| JAS 39B | Saab JAS 39 Gripen | 14 | 1998– | Two-seater |
| JAS 39C | Saab JAS 39 Gripen | 70 | 2002– | – |
| JAS 39D | Saab JAS 39 Gripen | 14 | 2003– | Two-seater |
| JAS 39E | Saab JAS 39 Gripen | 1 | 2019– | - |
| JAS 39F | Saab JAS 39 Gripen | 0 | ?– | Two-seater |
| TP 103 | Cessna Citation II | 2 | 1998– | VIP |

=== Helicopters (Helikopter) ===
| Des. | Aircraft | # Used | Year | Info |
| Hkp 1 | Vertol 44 | 2 | 1962–1964 | - |
| Hkp 2 | Alouette II | 8 | 1956–1986 | - |
| Hkp 3B | Agusta Bell 204B | 6 | 1962–1998 | - |
| Hkp 4A | Vertol 107-II | 9 | 1964–1992 | Four Hkp 4A rebuilt to Hkp 4D SAR/ASW standard, used as such by the Air Force for land based ASW operations. |
| HKP 6C | AB-206A JetRanger | 1 | – | – |
| HKP 9B | MBB Bo 105CBS | 4 | 1985–1993 | - |
| HKP 10 | Eurocopter Super Puma | 12 | 1988– | SAR |

=== Navy ===
| Des. | Aircraft | # Used | Year | Info |
| Hkp 1 | Vertol 44 | 11 | 1958–1971 | (2 transferred from Air Force) |
| Hkp 4B | Vertol 107-II-15 | 4 | 1964–2011 | Built by Kawasaki |
| HKP 4C | Vertol 107-II-16 | 8 | 1973–2011 | ASW, Built by Kawasaki |
| HKP 4D | Vertol 107-II-25 | 4 | 1991–2011 | ASW, Built by Kawasaki |
| HKP 6B | Agusta-Bell AB 206A JetRanger | 11 | 1970–2002 | Utility & Training |
| TP 54B | PA-31-350 Chieftain | 5 | 1989–1997 | IFR training |
| SH 89 | CASA C.212 Aviocar | 1 | 1986–2005 | ASW/Maritime surveillance |

=== Army ===
| Des. | Aircraft | # Used | Year | Info |
| Hkp 3C | Agusta Bell 204B | 19 | 1963–2000 | Some are modified Hkp 3A/B |
| Hkp 5 | Hughes 269A | 2 | 1962–1969 | – |
| HKP 5B | Schweizer 300C | 28 | 1980–2002 | Training, artillery spotting |
| HKP 6A | Agusta Bell 206A JetRanger | 22 | 1968–2002 | – |
| HKP 9A | MBB Bo 105CB-3 | 21 | 1987–2010 | Anti-armour. After 1999 only used for transport and training. |
| HKP 11 | Agusta-Bell AB 412 | 5 | 1994–2005 | – |
Fixed Wing
| Fpl 51A | Piper PA-18-150 Super Cub 6 | – | 1958–1974 | - |
| Fpl 51B | Piper PA-18-150 L-21B | 24 | 1958–1974 | - |
| Fpl 53 | Dornier Do 27 | 5 | 1962–1991 | - |
| Fpl 54 | MFI 10 Vipan | 2 | 1963–1964 | (evaluation only) |
| FPL 61C | Scottish Aviation Bulldog | 20 | 1972–1989 | Transferred to the Air Force in 1989 as SK 61C |

=== Common helicopter wing ===
Helicopters that entered after a 1998 re-organisation/merger.

All the above active helicopters that were active were merged into this service.

| Des. | Aircraft | # Used | Year | Info |
| HKP 14 | NH Industries NH 90 | 18 | 2007– | In service from 2011. Fully operational from 2016/2020. To be replaced with S-70 (H-60) variants. |
| HKP 15 | Agusta A109 Military | 20 | 2006– | 12 Land Based and 8 Sea Based. |
| HKP 16 | Sikorsky UH-60 Black Hawk | 15 | 2011– | Operational from 2013. |

=== Unmanned aerial vehicles ===
| Des. | Aircraft | # Used | Year | Info |
| RB01 | GAF Jindivik 2 | 10 | 1957–64 | Target drone, 104 missions. |
| RB02 | Nord Aviation CT20 | – | 1964–79 | Jet powered target drone. |
| RB03 | Northrop KD2R-5 ”Humlan” | – | 1967–2000 | Piston powered target drone. |
| RB06A | Beech Aircraft Raytheon MQM-107A | – | 1977– | Target drone. |
| RB06B | Beechcraft MQM-107 Streaker | – | 1986– | Target drone. |
| * | EADS 3 Sigma IrisJet | – | - | Turbojet powered aerial target. |
| UAV 01 | SAGEM Sperwer ”Ugglan” | 3 | 1999–2010 | UAV |
| UAV 02 | Elbit Skylark "Falken" | 48 | 2007– | UAV |
| UAV 03 | AAI RQ-7 Shadow 200 ”Örnen” | 8 | 2011– | UAV |
| UAV 04 | AeroVironment Wasp III "Svalan" | – | 2010–2013 | UAV |
| UAV 05A | AeroVironment Wasp III "Svalan" | * | 2012– | UAV |
| UAV 05B | AeroVironment RQ-20 Puma "Korpen" | 12 | 2012– | UAV *12 systems total A+B versions. |

== See also ==
=== Swedish Armed Forces ===
- Swedish Armed Forces
- Swedish Air Force
- Swedish Army
- Swedish Navy

=== Swedish military equipment ===
List of equipment of the Swedish Armed Forces

- Swedish Air Force:
  - Current fleet of the Swedish Air Force
  - List of equipment of the Swedish Air Force
  - Weapons of the Swedish Air Force
- Swedish Army:
  - List of equipment of the Swedish Army
- Swedish Navy:
  - List of active ships of the Swedish Navy
  - List of equipment of the Swedish Navy
- Swedish Home Guard:
  - List of equipment of the Swedish Home Guard
- Swedish Coast Guard:
  - Swedish Coast Guard ships
  - Swedish Coast Guard aviation
