= Roslagen Air Corps =

Coordinates: 59.4447°N 18.1253°E

- Roslagens flygkår
- Active: 1926–1974
- Country: Sweden
- Allegiance: Swedish Armed Forces
- Branch: Swedish Air Force
- Type: Corps (1926–1936, 1949–1974); Wing (1926–1949)
- Part of: Fourth Air Group (1926–1949); IV. milo (1949–1966); Milo Ö (1966–1974)
- Garrison/HQ: Hägernäs/Viggbyholm
- Mottos: A verbis ad verbera ("From words to facts")

Insignia
- Roundel

Aircraft flown
- Fighter: J 4
- Reconnaissance: S 1, S 2, S 3, S 4, S 5, S 9, S 12, S 17
- Trainer: Sk 2, Sk 3, Sk 4, Sk 6, Sk 15, Sk 50B
- Transport: Tp 1, Tp 2, Tp 8, Tp 24, Tp 45A, Tp 47, Tp 78
- Torpedo: T 1, T 2; Others: G 101, P 1, Se 102, Se 103, Se 104, Ö 2, Ö 7, Ö 9

Roslagen Air Corps (Swedish: Roslagens flygkår), also F 2 Hägernäs, or simply F 2, is a former Swedish Air Force air corps with the main base located on the east coast of Sweden just north of the capital Stockholm.

== History ==
From 1919 the area was used for flight training for navy pilots.

The wing started out as the 2nd Flying Corps in 1926 with seaplanes for naval scouting and reconnaissance and bomb and torpedo attacks. In 1936 the unit was designated F 2 as an Air Force wing.

A squadron of Heinkel T 2 (He 115) served between 1939 and 1944 and another squadron of Heinkel S 12 (He 114) between 1941 and 1945.

The last operational flying squadron at F 2 consisted of Saab S 17BS reconnaissance floatplanes from 1942 to 1949 when the wing was renamed Roslagens Flygkår, Roslagen Flying Corps. The wing then became home for various other operational units in the Air Force.

The unit became home to the naval rescue unit until it moved to Svea Wing (F 8) in 1960. From 1948, the Radar School was located at F 2 and in 1959 the GCI-school also joined.

From 1951 to 1962, the Air Force Meteorology School was located here until moving to Kalmar Wing (F 12).

In 1966 the Air Force Academy for ground troops was started at F 2 and remained until 1974 when the wing was decommissioned and all schools were transferred to Södertörn Wing (F 18).

The emblem of Uppland was after decommissioning transferred to Uppland Wing (F 16).

The base area was used for general seaplane aviation until converted to a residential area in 2002. One of the hangars remained and was restored as a parking garage.

== Heraldry and traditions ==
=== Coat of arms ===
Blazon: "Gules, the provincial badge of Uppland, a mound or, banded and ensigned with a cross-crosslet".

=== Colours, standards and guidons ===
A colour was presented to the wing on 6 June 1939 at F 8 in Barkarby by His Majesty the King Gustaf V. The colour is stored at the Swedish Army Museum in Stockholm. Blazon: "On blue cloth in the centre the badge of the Air Force; a winged two-bladed propeller under a royal crown proper. In the first corner: gules, the provincial badge of Uppland, a mound or, banded and ensigned with a cross-crosslet".

== Commanding officers ==
- 1926–1929: Arthur Örnberg
- 1929–1932: Christer Egerström
- 1932–1934: Arvid Flory
- 1934–1936: Harald Enell
- 1936–1944: Herman Sundin
- 1944–1948: Hugo Svenow
- 1948–1949: Richard Weidling
- 1949–1957: Gösta Sandberg
- 1957–1970: Trygve Sjölin
- 1970–1971: Arne Persson
- 1971–1974: Klas Normelius

== Names, designations and locations ==
| Name | Translation | From | | To |
|---|---|---|---|---|
| Andra flygkåren | 2nd Air Corps | 1926-07-01 | – | 1936-06-30 |
| Kungl. Upplands flygflottilj | Royal Uppland Wing | 1936-07-01 | – | 1936-08-31 |
| Kungl. Roslagens flygflottilj | Royal Roslagen Wing | 1936-09-01 | – | 1949-06-30 |
| Kungl. Roslagens flygkår | Royal Roslagen Air Corps | 1949-07-01 | – | 1974-06-30 |
| Designation | | From | | To |
| F 2 | | 1926-07-01 | – | 1974-06-30 |
| Location | | From | | To |
| Stockholm Naval Yard | | 1926-??-?? | – | 1929-??-?? |
| Hägernäs/Viggbyholm | | 1929-??-?? | – | 1974-06-30 |

== See also ==
- Swedish Air Force
- List of military aircraft of Sweden
