= Svenska Aero =

Swedish aircraft company

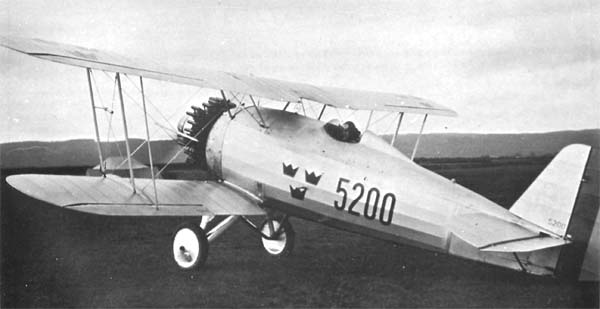

Svenska Aero AB (full name: Svenska Aero Aktiebolaget, lit. 'Swedish Aero Limited', abbr. SA) was a Swedish aircraft manufacturer on Hästholmen in Lidingö. The company was founded September 10, 1921, to license build Caspar-Werke and Heinkel aircraft. The company was bought by ASJA in 1932.

== History ==
After World War I, the German aircraft industry had several problems. German airlines were forbidden to operate multi engined aircraft and during a period all manufacturing of aircraft in Germany was banned. By 1921, some of the restrictions was lifted, civilian aircraft could be made after approval of an international control commission if they fulfilled certain requirements. In order to bypass these rules and to be able to make whatever aircraft they wanted, several aircraft manufacturers moved abroad. In 1921, Carl Bücker handled the purchase of a reconnaissance aircraft from Caspar-Werke in Travemünde. Because they expected problems due to the rules in the peace treaty regarding the export of German fighter aircraft, Bücker explored the possibility to smuggle the parts out of Germany and assemble the aircraft in Sweden.

To make the purchase easier, Ernst Heinkel and Bücker started Svenska Aero in Lidingö in 1921. The contract on the aircraft was transferred from Caspar to Svenska Aero. Heinkel and some German assembly workers temporarily moved to Lidingö to assemble the aircraft.

Bücker, who at the time was hired as test pilot by the navy airforce at TDS (Torpeddepartementet på flottans varv i Stockholm, Swedish for "the torpedo department at the navy's wharf in Stockholm"), quit to become CEO and the only board member of the new company. The first aircraft was assembled from components from Caspar-Werke in Travemünde. Some assembly was carried out at Svenska Aero's facilities, but they were finished by TDS as some the facilities of Svenska were unsuitable for production. In reality only rudders and pontoons were made in Sweden, the rest of the components were secretly manufactured by Caspar in several locations in Germany, to avoid detection by the allies. During 1922 to 1923, the company moved into a former shipyard in Skärsätra on Lidingö since the company had received additional orders from the navy's airforce. The parts for those aircraft was made in Sweden by Svenska Aero, but assembled by TDS. In 1928, the navy ordered four J 4 (Heinkel HD 19) as a fighter with pontoons. That delivery came to be the last license built aircraft by Svenska Aero.

In the mid-1920s, Svenska Aero created their own design department to be able to make their own aircraft models. Sven Blomberg, earlier employed by Heinkel Flugzeugwerke, was hired as head of design. In 1930, he was joined by Anders Johan Andersson from Messerschmitt. Despite that, Svenska Aero designed and made six different models on their own. The manufacturing was not the success Bücker counted on, as the airforce was only interested in buying prototypes and then building them themselves in their workshops TDS and CFM. This led to financial problems for the company. In 1932, Bücker decided to sell the company with staff to ASJA for 250,000 SEK. After the company had been sold, Bücker returned to Germany and started Bücker Flugzeugbau; A. J. Andersson joined the new company as head of design. Together, they created several internationally well known aircraft like Bücker Bü 181 Bestmann and Bücker Bü 133 Jungmeister. At the outbreak of World War II, autumn 1939, Andersson returned to Sweden where he led the design of the twin engine Saab 18.

Including licence-built and own designs, Svenska Aero made a total of 58 aircraft. Seven were exported to Latvia and one to Norway. Between 1926 and 1932, the Swedish air force bought 15 different types of aircraft; eight of them from Svenska Aero.

== Products ==
=== Designed and built ===
- Svenska Aero SA-10 Piraten (military designation Ö 7) (2 made)
- Svenska Aero SA-11 Jaktfalken (military designation J 5) (1 made)
- Svenska Aero SA-12 Skolfalken (military designation Sk 8) (1 made)
- Svenska Aero SA-13 Övningsfalken (military designation Ö 8) (1 made)
- Svenska Aero SA-14 Jaktfalken II (military designation J 6) (11 made)
- Svenska Aero SA-15 prototype (military designation S 8) manufactured by ASJA

=== License built ===
- Heinkel He 1 Hansa Brandenburg type 31 (military designation S 2) earlier called Caspar S.I
- Heinkel He 1 - Hansa Brandenburg type 32 (military designation S 2)
- Heinkel He 2 Hansa Brandenburg type 42 (military designation S 3) earlier called HE S.II (4 made)
- Heinkel He 4 Hansa Brandenburg type 47 (military designation S 4) earlier called HE S.IIa (5 made)
- Heinkel He 5 Hansa (military designation S 5) (14 made)
- Heinkel HD 19 (military designation J 4) (5 made)
- Heinkel HD 24 (military designation Sk 4) (6 made)
- Heinkel HD 35 trainer (military designation Sk 5) (1 made)

=== Aircraft sold by Svenska Aero made by Casper/Heinkel ===
- Heinkel He 3
- Heinkel HD 14
- Heinkel HD 16 (military designation T-1)
- Heinkel HD 33
