= Heinkel HE 8 =

H.E.8, H.E.31 and HM.II
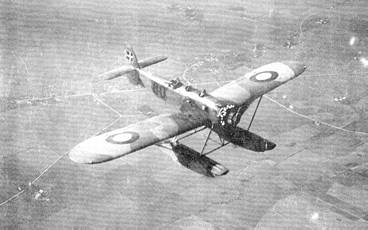
- Orlogsvaerftet HM.II of the Royal Danish Navy

General information
- Type: Reconnaissance floatplane
- National origin: Germany
- Manufacturer: Heinkel
- Primary user: Danish Navy
- Number built: 24

History
- First flight: 1927
- Developed from: Heinkel HE 5

The Heinkel H.E.8 was a reconnaissance monoplane floatplane built in Germany in the late 1920s. It was developed at the request of the Royal Danish Navy, which required a similar aircraft to the H.E.5 being operated in Sweden.

== Service History ==
In addition to purchasing seven German-built H.E.8a aircraft, which were described as mailplanes to avoid restrictions on military aircraft, 16 H.E.8bs were built under license in Denmark by the Orlogsværftet Naval shipyards, with a final batch not being delivered until 1938. Apart from its engine, the H.E.8 differed from previous members of the H.E.1 family in having a conventional empennage.

22 aircraft were operated by the Royal Danish Navy as the HM.II until the German invasion in 1940, after which one example may have been impressed into Luftwaffe service while the remainder were stored, until most were destroyed in 1943.

A single H.E.8 was built with a Packard 3A-2500 engine and designated H.E.31.

A single H.E.8d was built under licence in Yugoslavia by Zmaj Aircraft. It was initially used for testing by 2. Seaplane Kommando at Split, Yugoslavia, and was later used for target towing duties until fleeing to Greece following the fall of Yugoslavia in WW2.

== Variants ==
H.E.8a
company designation of version powered with an 287 kW (385 hp) Armstrong Siddeley Jaguar IV 14-cylinder two-row radial engine.

H.E.8b
company designation of version powered with an 340 kW (460 hp) Armstrong Siddeley Jaguar VIC 14-cylinder two-row radial engine.
H.E.8d
company designation of version powered with an 360 kW (480 hp) Gnôme & Rhône Jupiter 9 cylinder single-row radial engine.
H.E.31
version powered with an 600 kW (800 hp) Packard 3A-2500 V-12.
HM.II
Danish Navy designation for all variants.
ZMAJ-Heinkel H.E.8
Yugoslavian designation for one H.E.8d built in Yugoslavia.

== Operators ==
Denmark

- Royal Danish Navy - imported 7 H.E.8a from Germany, and built 16 H.E.8b under licence.

Yugoslavia

- Royal Yugoslav Navy - operated one H.E.8d.

== Specifications (HM.II) ==
Data from Jane's all the World's Aircraft 1931

General characteristics

- Crew: 3
- Length: 11.65 m (38 ft 3 in)
- Wingspan: 16.8 m (55 ft 1 in)
- Height: 4.4 m (14 ft 5 in)
- Wing area: 45 m^{2} (480 sq ft)
- Empty weight: 1,675 kg (3,693 lb)
- Gross weight: 2,650 kg (5,842 lb)
- Powerplant: 1 × Armstrong Siddeley Jaguar 14-cylinder two-row air-cooled geared radial piston engine, 320 kW (430 hp)
- Propellers: 2-bladed fixed-pitch metal propeller

Performance

- Maximum speed: 212 km/h (132 mph, 114 kn)
- Range: 1,290 km (800 mi, 700 nmi)
- Service ceiling: 5,600 m (18,400 ft)
- Rate of climb: 2.8 m/s (550 ft/min)
- Time to altitude: 1,000 m (3,300 ft) in 3 minutes 12 seconds and 5,000 m (16,000 ft) in 28 minutes
- Wing loading: 61.8 kg/m^{2} (12.7 lb/sq ft)
- Power/mass: 14.2 lb/hp (8.6 kg/kW)

Armament

- Guns: 1 × fixed, forward-firing 8 mm (0.315 in) Madsen machine gun, 1 × trainable, rearward-firing 8 mm (0.315 in) Madsen machine gun
- Bombs: 8 × 12.5 kg (28 lb) bombs

== See also ==
Related lists

- List of aircraft of World War II
