= J24 =

J24 may refer to:

== Vehicles ==
- J/24, a keelboat
- FVM J24, a Swedish fighter aircraft
- HMS Hebe (J24), a Halcyon-class minesweeper of the Royal Navy
- LNER Class J24, a British steam locomotive class

== Other uses ==
- Gyroelongated pentagonal cupola, a Johnson solid (J_{24})
- Johor State Route J24, a road in Malaysia
