= Viking Two =

Viking Two, Viking 2, Viking II, or variant, may refer to:

- Viking 2 (1975-1980) NASA space probe to Mars
- Viking II (rocket), a 1949 U.S. NRL sounding rocket mission
- Société Européenne de Propulsion Viking 2 (rocket engine), the first production version of the Viking (rocket engine)
- MS Viking 2 (1986) (since 1976), a passenger ferry called "Viking 2" (1986-1988)
- Empire Viking II, the Empire Ship named "Viking II", see List of Empire ships (U–Z)
- Viking Aircraft Viking II, a powered parachute made by Viking Aircraft, introduced in 2000
- ASJA Viking II, a Swedish 4-seat light airplane
- Vickers Viking II, the name of the second production aircraft of the WW1 amphibious plane Vickers Viking
- Viking FK 2 (a.k.a. Viking 2) Stavanger, Norway soccer team
- Vikings (season 2), 2014 TV season of Vikings TV series
- Vikings episode 2 "Wrath of the Northmen", see List of Vikings episodes

== See also ==
- Viking (disambiguation)
