= Saab 17 =

Swedish dive bomber

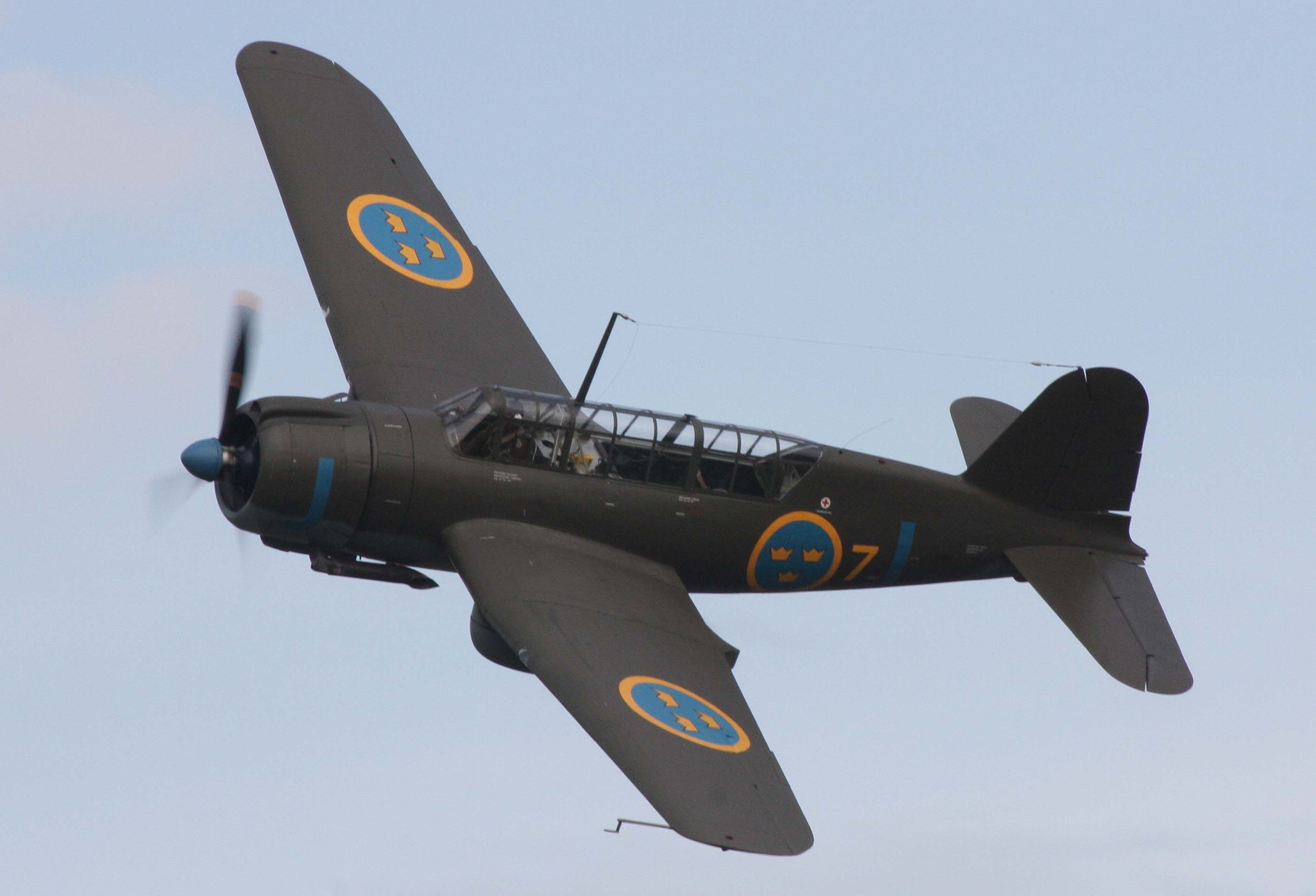

General information
- Type: Reconnaissance-dive bomber
- National origin: Sweden
- Manufacturer: SAAB
- Primary users: Swedish Air Force Imperial Ethiopian Air Force; Royal Danish Air Force
- Number built: 326 (including 2 prototypes)

History
- Manufactured: 1941–1944
- Introduction date: March 1942
- First flight: 18 May 1940
- Retired: 1977 (Ethiopia)

The Saab 17 is a Swedish single-engine monoplane reconnaissance dive-bomber aircraft of the 1940s originally developed by ASJA prior to its merger into Saab. It was the first all-metal stressed skin aircraft developed in Sweden.

== Design and development ==
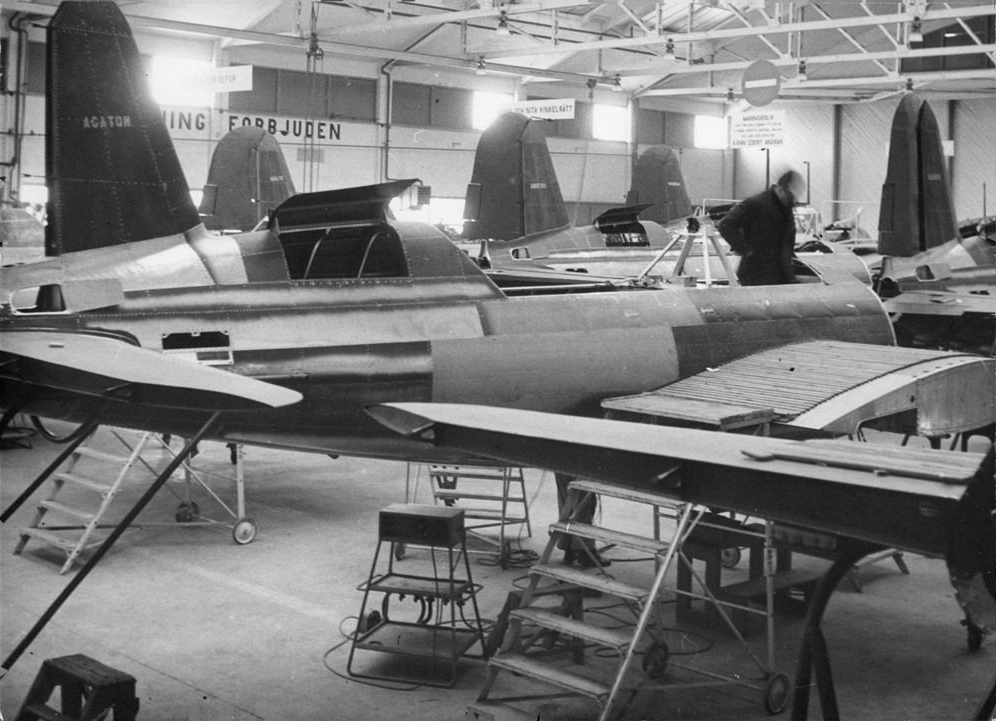
B 17s in Trollhättan assembly hall in 1944

The project was initiated in response to a 1938 request from the Flygvapnet (Swedish Air Force) for a reconnaissance aircraft to replace the obsolete Fokker S 6 (C.Ve) sesquiplane. Design work began at the end of the 1930s as the L 10 by ASJA, but once accepted by the Flygvapnet it was assigned the designations B 17 and S 17 for the bomber and reconnaissance versions respectively, and it became better known as the Saab 17.

The design chosen was a conventional mid-wing cantilever monoplane with a long greenhouse canopy and a single radial engine in the nose. Control surfaces were covered in fabric but the remainder was stressed-skin duraluminum. It could be fitted with wheels or skiis, both of which retracted straight to the rear along the underside of the wing, leaving prominent fairings, and when fitted with wheels the undercarriage doors could be used as dive brakes. A retractable tailwheel was provided. A floatplane version was built in small numbers for coastal reconnaissance to replace the obsolete Svenska Aero S 5, with massive fairings joining the floats to the wings where the wheels would have been. To maintain stability small vertical fins were added to the horizontal stabilizer. The wings were reinforced so that it could be used as a dive bomber. Bomb racks were provided under the wings, along with a small bomb bay below the cockpit, although some examples used a conventional rack on the centreline. On the bomber versions, a crutch was fitted to swing the bomb clear of the aircraft in vertical diving attacks, when the bomb could otherwise have passed through the propeller. The reconnaissance versions lacked the crutch. Split flaps broken into four segments were fitted to the underside trailing edge of the wing.

Two L 10 prototypes were ordered, the first being powered by a 880 hp (660 kW) Bristol Mercury XII radial engine built by Nohab in Sweden, and the second with an imported 1,065 hp (794 kW) Pratt & Whitney R-1830 Twin Wasp C radial.

Supplies of suitable engines remained a major problem, and resulted in the aircraft being built in three versions with different engines. The definitive B 17A used the Swedish-built STWC-3 (Swedish Twin Wasp C-3), an unlicenced copy of the R-1830. The B 17B used a Bristol Mercury XXIV built by Svenska Flygmotor AB (SFA) in Sweden, and the B 17C used an imported 1,060 hp (790 kW) Piaggio P.XI radial from Italy. The United States government denied a request to purchase a licence to build the Twin Wasp, so an unlicensed, reverse engineered copy was built instead as the STWC-3 (Swedish Twin Wasp C-3) to supplement and replace the lower powered Mercury radials already being built under licence. Until production caught up with demand, the earliest aircraft being delivered were flown to their destinations, the engines were removed and shipped back, to be used on the next aircraft to be delivered.

== Operational history ==
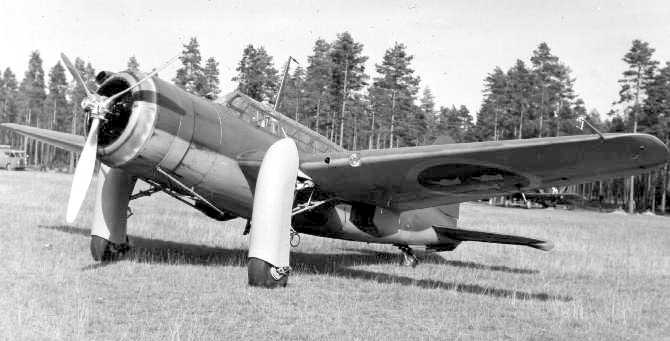
Saab B 17B showing bombing crutch under the fuselage needed to allow the bomb to clear the propeller during a dive, and the large undercarriage doors which acted as dive brakes

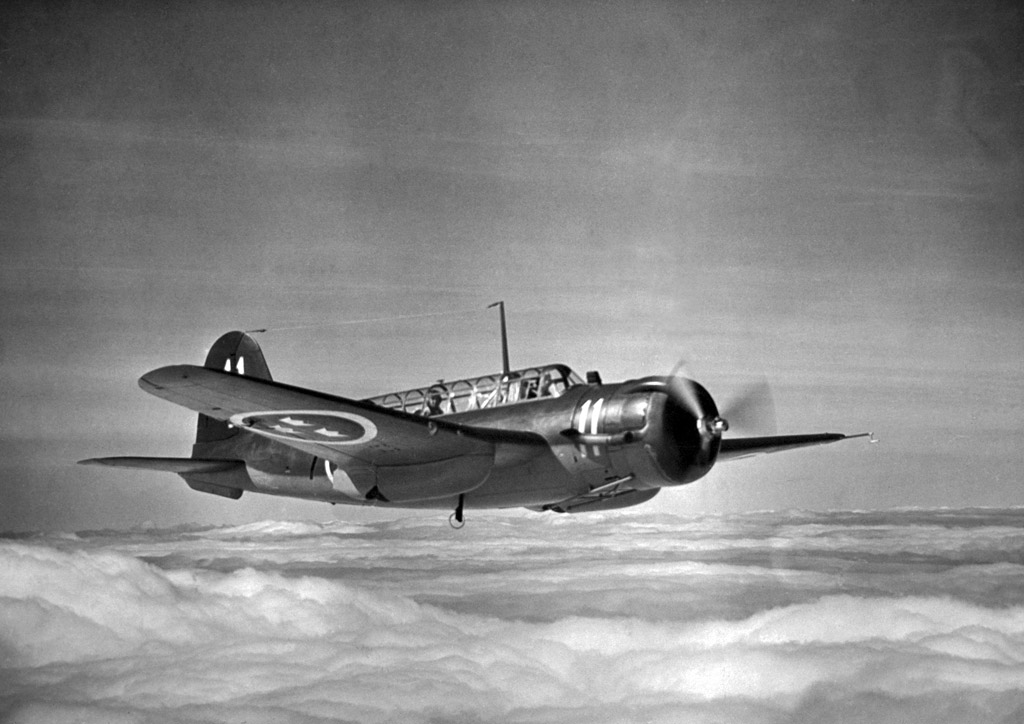
Saab B 17B in flight

The first flight was on 18 May 1940 and first deliveries of dive bombers to the Flygvapnet began in March 1942, while deliveries of reconnaissance versions began in June 1942, and the type was operational by September 1942 when the first exercises were carried out. Problems immediately arose with wing failures, and additional modifications were needed before it could be cleared for dive bombing, which remained limited to shallow attacks thereafter. The final aircraft was delivered on 31 August 1944.

A B 17 was used to test the ejection seat Saab had developed for use in the Saab 21 pusher fighter, which was first successfully fired on 27 February 1944 with a dummy.

Stig Wennerström gained some fame in Sweden for successfully bailing out from a B 17 from low altitude, with his gunner, but would later become a spy for the Soviet Union.

For several months in late 1944 and early 1945 fifteen B 17As were operated by the Danish Brigade in Sweden (Danforce) a unit of 5000 men (including 50 airmen) in Sweden which had been formed to assist in liberating occupied Denmark from the Nazis, and prevent retreating German soldiers from using civilians as human shields and carrying out scorched earth tactics, as they had done elsewhere. However, due to the German surrender on 7 May 1945, the aircraft were no longer needed and were returned to Flygvapnet control a couple of months later.

Rapid advances in aviation related to improved aerodynamics, higher engine power and finally the introduction of jet engines, resulted in it having a short career, and it was gradually withdrawn from frontline service between 1948 and 1950, while the last examples were retired from secondary roles by 1954. Over the next few years, examples would be sold off to various operators.

Due to the efforts of Carl Gustaf von Rosen, the Imperial Ethiopian Air Force bought 47 B 17As which were operated from 1947 until 1977. Ethiopian B 17s were used to suppressed the 1960 coup attempt in Addis Ababa. Several aircraft were stationed at Kebri Dahar in Ogaden during the 1964 conflict with Somalia. By late summer 1977, the 3rd Squadron based at Dire Dawa was deactivated and its remaining twelve B 17s were stored at the airbase. During the Ogaden War, eight B 17s that were stored at Dire Dawa airbase were destroyed by Somali bombardment in August 1977.

From 1951, 19 B 17s were loaned to Svensk Flygtjanst AB and AVIA for use as target tugs and painted yellow with civilian markings. One of these, a B 17A SE-BYF was sold to the Austrian Österreichische Luftstreitkräfte in 1957, where it continued to be used as a target tug until retired in 1963. Two B 17As were also sold to the Finnish Ilmavoimat in 1959 and 1960, also as target tugs. Neither of the Finnish aircraft lasted long before being destroyed in accidents.

== Variants ==
=== Company designations ===
L 10
internal ASJA/Saab designation; two produced

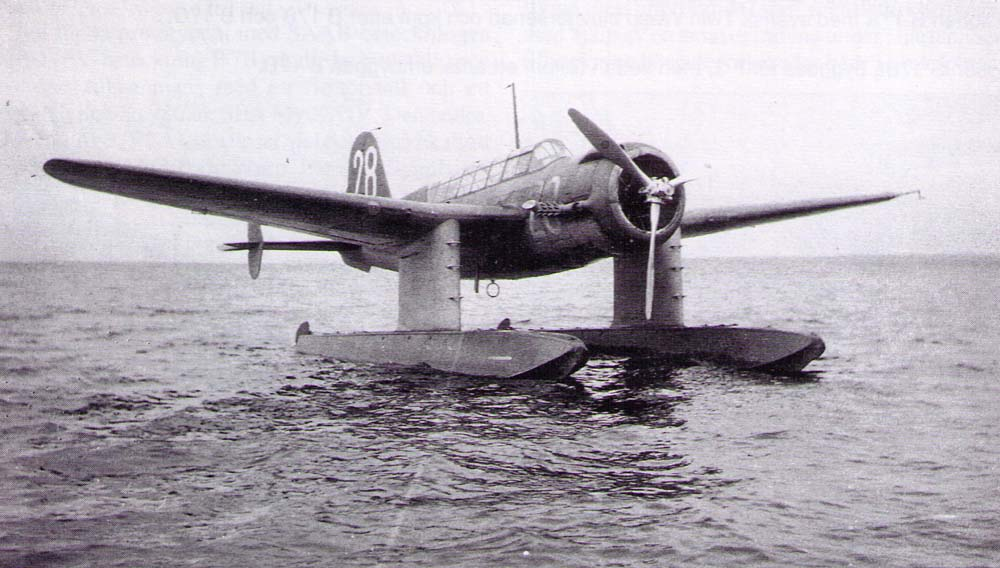
Saab S 17BS mounted on floats

L 10A
internal ASJA/Saab designation for 17A, B, and C
L 10BL
internal ASJA/Saab designation for S17BL
L 10BS
internal ASJA/Saab designation for S17BS

=== Flygvapnet designations ===
P 7
L 10 development prototypes

B 8
Preliminary designation for bomber version of L 10, not used

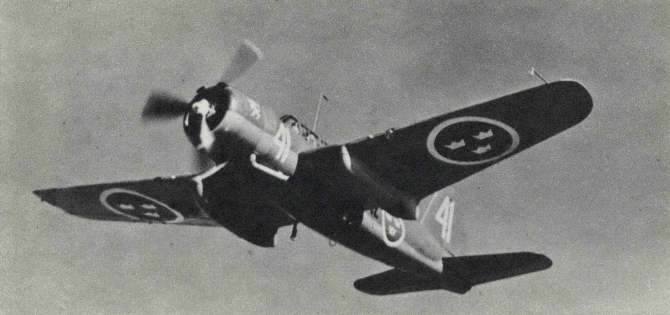
Saab B 17C in flight. The three main versions could be distinguished by their intakes and exhausts. The 17A had a single intake centred on the top of the cowling, the 17B had a single intake offset to starboard along with a prominent exhaust on the same side, and the 17C had two intakes on either side of the top

B 17A
Bomber with 1,065 hp (794 kW) Svenska Flygmotor Aktiebolaget (SFA)-built STWC-3 (Pratt & Whitney R-1830-S1C3G Twin Wasp) radial engine; 132 built
B 17B
Bomber with 980 hp (730 kW) SFA-built Bristol Mercury XXIV radial engine; 55 built
B 17C
Bomber with 1,060 hp (790 kW) Piaggio P.XIbis R.C.40D radial engine; 77 built

S 15
Preliminary designation for reconnaissance version of the L 10, not used
S 17BL
Reconnaissance version of B 17B with wheeled or ski landing gear; 21 built
S 17BS
Reconnaissance version of B 17B with floats, powered by a Bristol Mercury XXIV engine; 38 built

A total of 326 Saab 17 aircraft of all types were produced, and some bombers were converted into reconnaissance aircraft.

== Operators ==
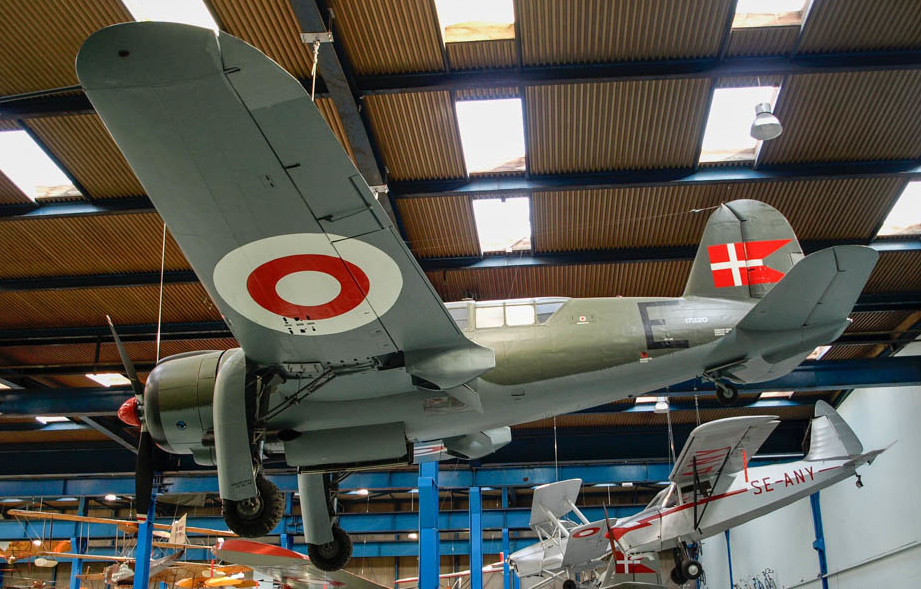
Saab B 17A displayed in Helsingør in Danish markings

Austria

- Österreichische Luftstreitkräfte (Austrian Air Force) - operated one target tug

Denmark

- Flyvevåbnet (Royal Danish Air Force) - operated 15 on loan while in exile with the Den Danske Brigade Danforce in 1945.

Ethiopia

- Ye Ithopya A yer Hayl (Imperial Ethiopian Air Force) - operated 47 examples

Finland

- Ilmavoimat (Finnish Air Force) - operated two target tugs

Sweden

- Svenska Flygvapnet (Swedish Air Force)
  - F 2 Hägernäs/Roslagen Air Corps Naval Support Wing (Hägernäs, near Stockholm) - S 17BS floatplanes only
  - F 4 Frösön/Jämtland Wing (Frösön)
  - F 6 Karlsborg/Västgöta Wing (Karlsborg)
  - F 7 Såtenäs/Skaraborg Wing (Såtenäs)
  - F 12 Kalmar/Kalmar Wing (Kalmar)

== Surviving aircraft ==
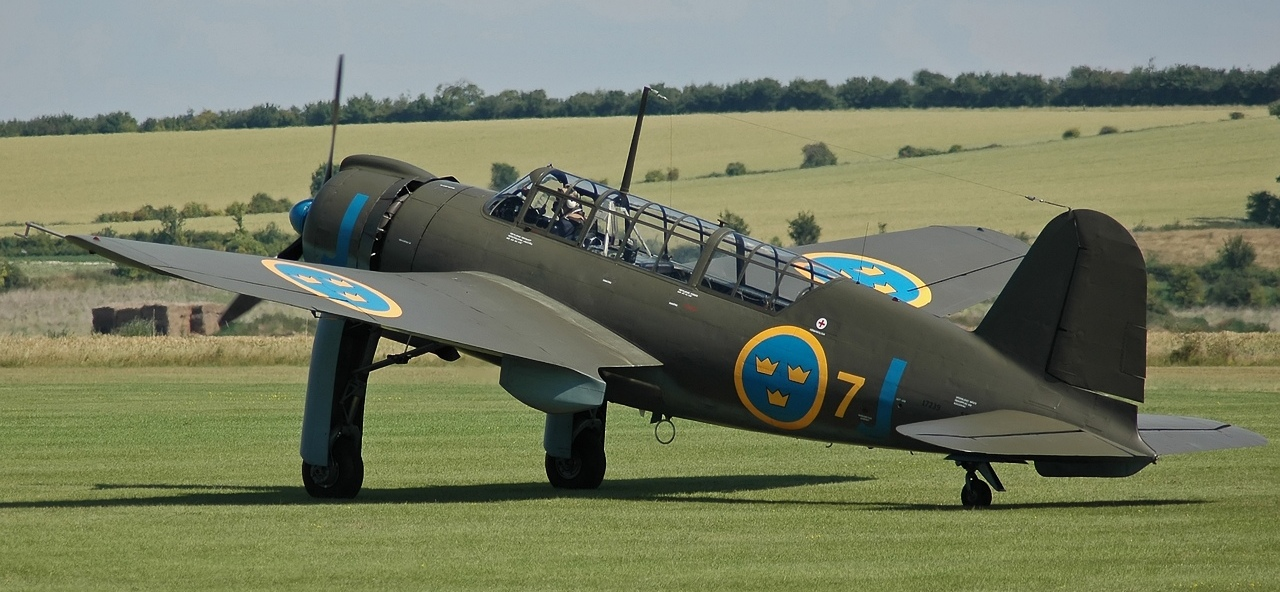
Saab B 17A flown by the Swedish Air Force Museum. A second B 17 is displayed in the museum.

Five Saab 17s are known to be in existence today, three of which are on public display.

The Swedish Air Force Museum in Linköping has two aircraft in their collection, a S 17BL '5', serial 17005 which is on static display in the museum, and a B 17A '7', serial 17239, the latter being kept in airworthy condition and which is periodically flown.

Another B 17A 'E', serial 17320 which was donated by the Flygvapnet after having served as a target tug is on display at the Danish Museum of Science and Technology in Helsingør/Elsinore.

Two former Ethiopian B 17As were recovered in the 1990s and purchased by a South African collector as a part of a large batch of ex-Ethiopian aircraft. These were shipped to Lithuania but their current status and location is unknown following the collapse of the collector's business interests.

== Specifications (B 17C) ==
Data from Saab Aircraft since 1937

General characteristics

- Crew: Two
- Length: 10 m (32 ft 10 in)
- Wingspan: 13.7 m (44 ft 11 in)
- Height: 4.5 m (14 ft 9 in)
- Wing area: 28.5 m^{2} (307 sq ft)
- Empty weight: 2,680 kg (5,908 lb)
- Gross weight: 3,870 kg (8,532 lb)
- Powerplant: 1 × Piaggio P.XIbis R.C.40D 14 cylinder air-cooled radial piston engine, 790 kW (1,060 hp)
- Propellers: 3-bladed Piaggio P.1001 variable pitch propeller

Performance

- Maximum speed: 435 km/h (270 mph, 235 kn)
- Cruise speed: 370 km/h (230 mph, 200 kn)
- Minimum control speed: 125 km/h (78 mph, 67 kn)
- Range: 1,700 km (1,100 mi, 920 nmi)
- Service ceiling: 9,800 m (32,200 ft)
- Rate of climb: 10 m/s (2,000 ft/min)
- Wing loading: 139 kg/m^{2} (28 lb/sq ft)
- Power/mass: 0.220 kW/kg (0.134 hp/lb)

Armament

- Guns:
  - 2 × fixed forward-firing 8 mm (0.315 in) Flygplanskulspruta Ksp m/22F (M1919 Browning AN/M2) machine guns
  - 1 × rear cockpit flexible 8 mm (0.315 in) Flygplanskulspruta Ksp m/22R (M1919 Browning AN/M2) machine gun
- Bombs:
  - 700 kg (1,500 lb) of bombs could be carried. Racks were provided under the wings, in an internal bomb bay and externally on the fuselage centreline.

== See also ==
Aircraft of comparable role, configuration, and era

- Aichi D3A
- Blackburn Skua
- Caproni Ca.355
- Curtiss SB2C Helldiver
- Douglas SBD Dauntless
- Mitsubishi Ki-51
- Naval Aircraft Factory SBN
- Northrop A-17
- Sukhoi Su-2
- Vultee Vengeance

Related lists

- List of bomber aircraft
- List of military aircraft of Sweden
