= J23 =

J23 may refer to:

== Roads ==
- County Route J23 (California)

== Vehicles ==
- FVM J 23, a Swedish fighter aircraft
- GNR Class J23, a British steam locomotive
- HMS Abingdon (J23), a Hunt-class minesweeper of the Royal Navy
- HSwMS Hälsingland (J23), an Östergötland-class destroyer of the Swedish Navy

== Other uses ==
- Agent J-23, a character in the Polish television series Stawka większa niż życie
- Gyroelongated square cupola, a Johnson solid (J_{23})
- J23, an album by Danny K
- The 2023 Spanish general election, nicknamed "23J" by the Spanish media
