= Södertörn Wing =

Coordinates: 59°11′18″N 17°54′59″E

- Södertörns flygflottilj
- Active: 1946–1974
- Country: Sweden
- Allegiance: Swedish Armed Forces
- Branch: Swedish Air Force
- Type: Wing (1940–1957); Sector wing (1957–1965); Wing (1965–1974)
- Role: Fighter wing
- Part of: Third Air Group (1944–1948); Unknown (1948–1957); Third Air Group (1957–1966); Eastern Military District (1966–1974)
- Garrison/HQ: Stockholm/Tullinge
- Motto: Mens agit molem ("The Mind Moves Mountains" / (lit.) "Mind moves the mass")

Insignia
- Roundel

Aircraft flown
- Fighter: J 22, J 28B/C, J 34, J 35B
- Trainer: Sk 12, Sk 14, Sk 15, Sk 16, Sk 50
- Transport: Sk 60, Tp 87, Tp 88

Södertörn Wing (Swedish: Södertörns flygflottilj), also F 18 Tullinge, or simply F 18, is a former Swedish Air Force wing with the main base located in Tullinge just south-west of the capital Stockholm on the east coast.

== Heraldry and traditions ==
=== Coat of arms ===
Blazon: "Per bend sinister or and gules a griffon segreant sable, armed azure, in both foreclutches an orb or".

=== Colours, standards and guidons ===
The colour of the wing is preserved at the Swedish Army Museum. Blazon: "On blue cloth in the centre the badge of the Air Force; a winged two-bladed propeller under a royal crown proper. In the first corner a griffon segreant armed, holding an orb, all or".

== Commanding officers ==
Some J34 Hunter in a hangar at F18 in 1956.

The commanding officer was referred to as "wing commander" and had the rank of colonel.

- 1946–1949: Björn Lindskog
- 1949–1963: Erik Raab
- 1963–1966: Dick Stenberg
- 1966–1974: Sven Alm

== Names, designations and locations ==
Name	Translation	From		To
Kungl. Södertörns flygflottilj	Royal Södertörn Wing; Royal Södertörn Air Group	1944-07-01	–	1974-12-31
Designation		From		To
F 18		1946-07-01	–	1957-09-30
F 18/Se O2		1957-10-01	–	1965-??-??
F 18		1965-??-??	–	1974-06-30
Location		From		To
Tullinge Airport		1946-07-01	–	1974-06-30

== See also ==
- Swedish Air Force
- List of military aircraft of Sweden
