= FVM Ö1 Tummelisa =

1920s Swedish biplane trainer

Övningsflygplan 1 "Tummelisa"
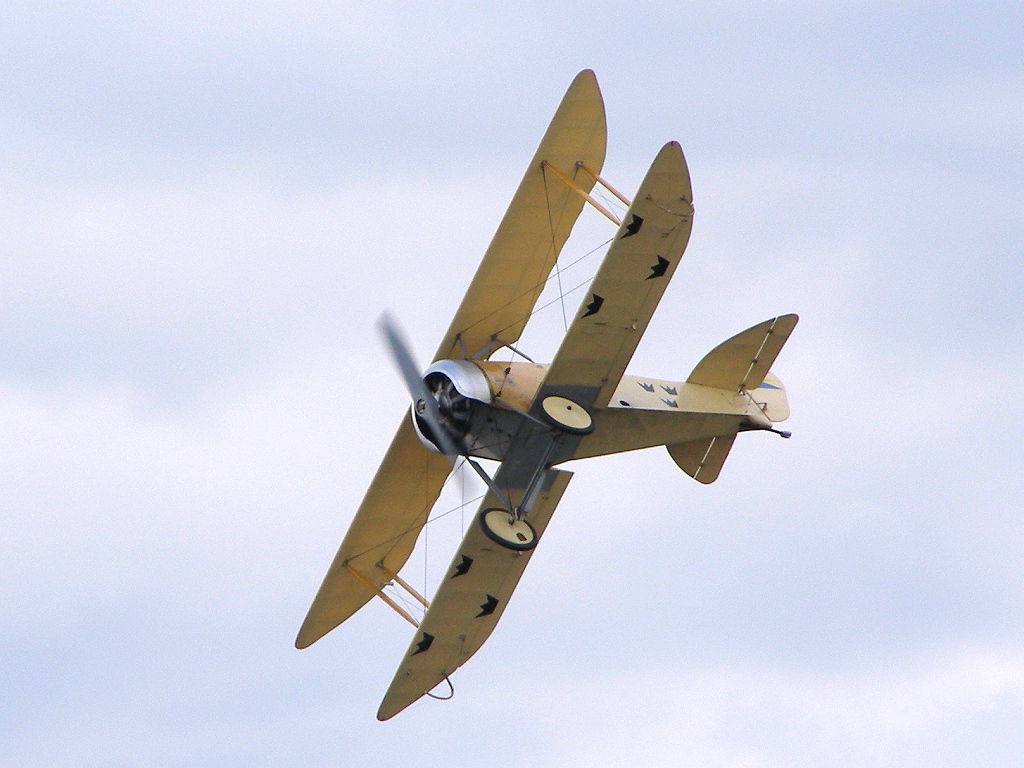
- Carlson replica

General information
- Type: Training aircraft
- National origin: Sweden
- Manufacturer: FVM (Flygkompaniets Tygverkstäder på Malmen) (Note: FVM (Flygkompaniets tygverkstäder Malmslätt) was renamed CFM (Centrala Flygverkstaden i Malmslätt) in 1926 when the Air Force was established and in 1936 became CVM (Centrala Verkstaden i Malmslätt). Both these later acronyms sometimes replace FVM in the Tummelisa's name.)
- Designer: Gösta von Porat and Henry Kjellson
- Primary user: Swedish Air Force
- Number built: 28 plus a replica

History
- Introduction date: 1921
- First flight: June 1920
- Retired: 1935

The FVM Ö 1 Tummelisa (Swedish for Thumbelina) is a single seat, single engine Swedish biplane from the 1920s. It was operated by the Swedish Air Force as its advanced trainer until the mid-1930s.

== Design and development ==
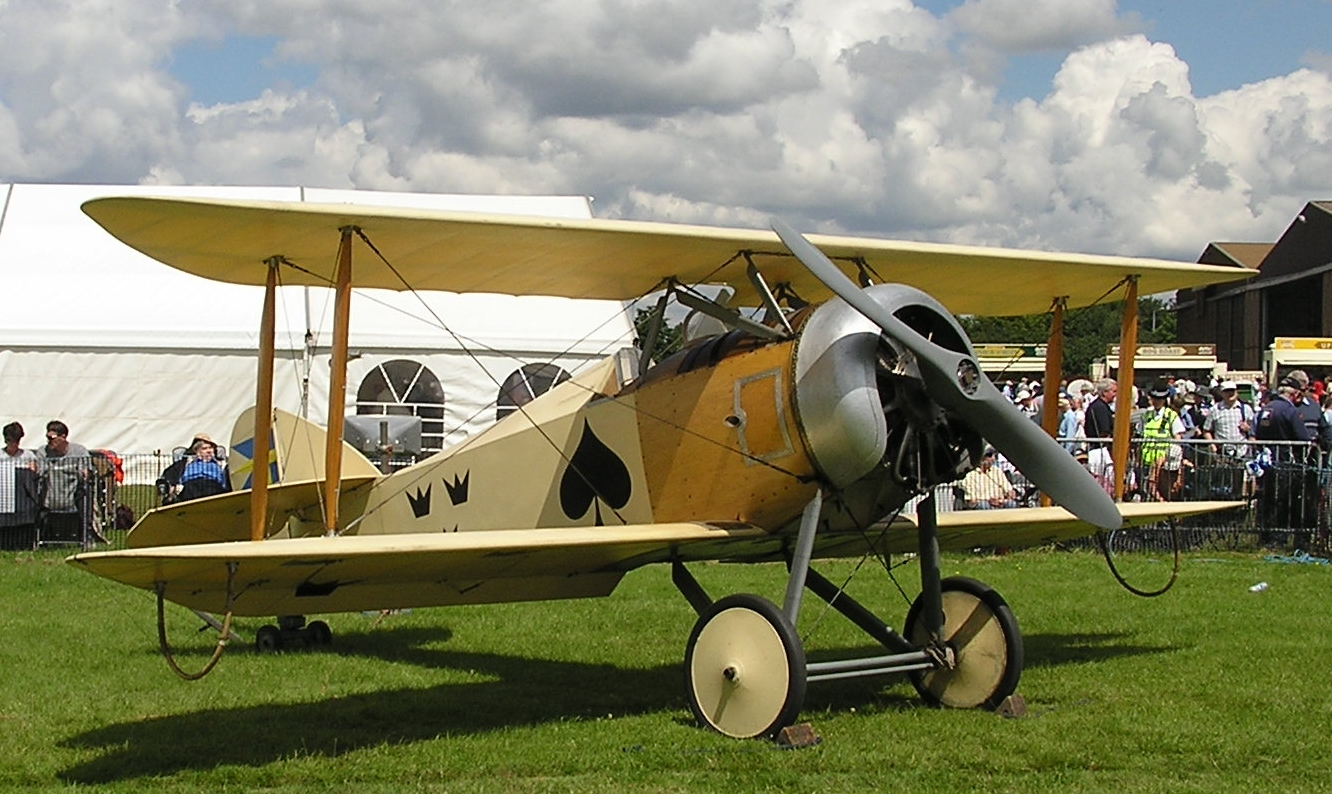
Carlson replica in the UK Flying Legends show, 2007

In 1919 Gösta von Porat was completing an advanced aeronautics course in France, part of which was a design study for an 80 hp (60 kW) single engine biplane. He returned to his native Sweden to lead the Swedish Army Telegraph Corps' Aviation Department, based near Linköping which had FVM as its workshop and passed on the rather incomplete set of diagrams and calculations to Henry Kjellson, an engineer there. Von Porat also made several 90 hp (67 kW) Le-Rhone-Thulin rotary engines, bought after the bankruptcy of the Thulin concern, available to Kjellson.

The result was the E.1, the factory name. The nickname Tummelisa, after the female partner of Tom Thumb, was widely used, though often shortened to Lisa. After the formation of the Swedish Air Force in 1926 the aircraft became officially known as the Ö 1. It is an all-wood single bay biplane, with equal span wings without stagger. The wings have simple parallel, faired interplane struts, assisted by flying wires and carry full-span ailerons only on the lower wing. There is a small trailing edge cut-out over the cockpit to improve the upward view. Its fuselage has a square section, with raised decking behind the cockpit. The Thulin A rotary engine has the usual incomplete cowling associated with this engine type, intended to restrict oil-spray. The Tummelisa has mainwheels on a fixed, single axle undercarriage, mounted via faired V-struts to the lower fuselage longerons, assisted by a tailskid and underwing wire loops. The broad chord tail surfaces have curved leading edges, with the tailplane mounted on top of the fuselage.

The Tummelisa flew for the first time in June 1920, with von Porat at the controls. There were few problems.

== Operational history ==
28 Tummelisas were built as advanced trainers. Once the gyroscopic effects of the rotary engine were mastered, it was a "delightful aircraft to fly". They remained in service with the Swedish Air Force until 1935. No original Tummelisa flies regularly, though one, normally a museum exhibit, was flown in anniversary displays in 1951 and 1962.

A carefully constructed replica, built by Mikael Carlson in the 1980s and fitted with an original Thulin engine has flown in displays across Europe, in North America and Australasia.

On 7 September 2019 at the airshow Airpower in Zeltweg, Austria, a Swedish-painted Tummelisa overturned at a late phase of its landing on grass. The airplane was damaged but the pilot climbed out unhurt.

== Operators ==
Sweden

- Swedish Air Force

== Aircraft on display ==
- Tummelisa Fv-656, 3656 is displayed at Flygvapenmuseum in Malmen (Swedish Air Force Museum, Linköping).

== Specifications ==
Data from Swedish Air Force Museum

General characteristics

- Crew: 1
- Length: 5.5 m (18 ft 1 in)
- Wingspan: 7.8 m (25 ft 7 in)
- Powerplant: 1 × Thulin A 9-cylinder rotary, 67 kW (90 hp)
- Propellers: 2-bladed

Performance

- Maximum speed: 145 km/h (90 mph, 78 kn)
- Service ceiling: 5,000 m (16,000 ft)
