= Heinkel HE 2 =

Two-seat floatplane

HE 2
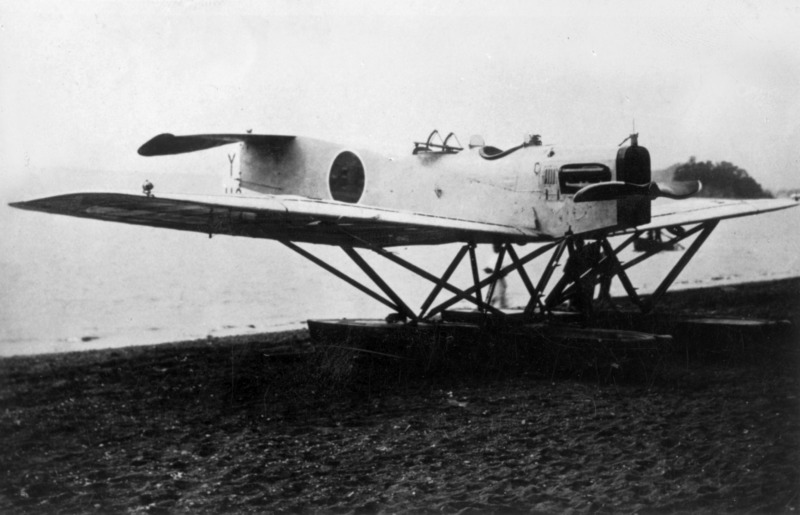

General information
- Type: Reconnaissance floatplane
- National origin: Germany
- Manufacturer: Svenska
- Designer: Heinkel Flugzeugwerke
- Primary user: Swedish Navy
- Number built: 5

History
- First flight: 1923

The Heinkel HE 2, produced in Sweden as the Svenska S 3 and nicknamed the "Hansa", was a reconnaissance floatplane built in small numbers to equip the Swedish Navy in the 1920s. It was a refinement of the HE 1, sharing its same basic configuration as a low-wing, strut-braced monoplane with no tail fin and a rudder that barely protruded above and below the line of the fuselage.

Originally, three were purchased, with another one built by Svenska Aero some time later, and a fifth and final aircraft built by the Navy itself. The type remained in service for over 10 years, finally being retired in 1935.

== Specifications ==
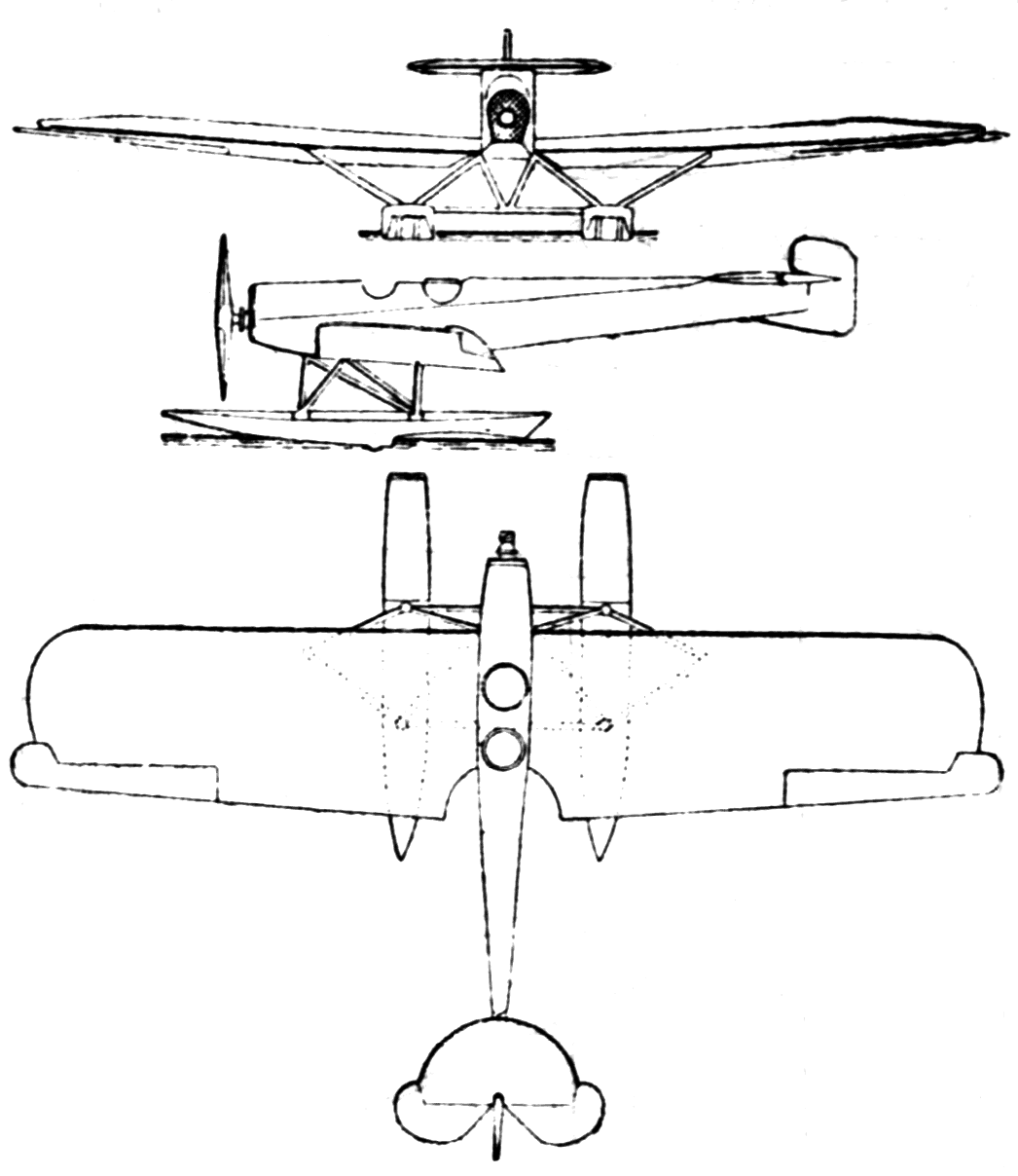
Svenska S.II 3-view drawing from Le Document aéronautique October,1926

General characteristics

- Crew: Two, pilot and observer
- Length: 12.66 m (41 ft 6 in)
- Wingspan: 17.48 m (57 ft 4 in)
- Height: 3.90 m (12 ft 10 in)
- Wing area: 53.6 m^{2} (577 sq ft)
- Empty weight: 1,863 kg (4,107 lb)
- Gross weight: 2,475 kg (5,456 lb)
- Powerplant: 1 × Rolls-Royce Eagle IX , 270 kW (360 hp)

Performance

- Maximum speed: 183 km/h (114 mph, 99 kn)
- Service ceiling: 4,000 m (13,123 ft)
- Rate of climb: 3.3 m/s (650 ft/min)

Armament

- 1 × trainable, rearward-firing 7.92 mm (.312 in) Madsen m/22 machine gun
