= Heinkel HD 24 =

Training seaplane

HD 24
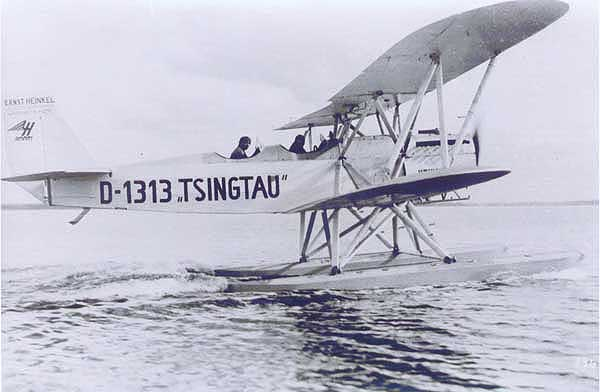
- Plüschow's seaplane, the Heinkel HD 24 "Tsingtau"

General information
- Type: Training seaplane
- National origin: Germany
- Manufacturer: Heinkel, Svenska Aero
- Primary users: DVS Flygvapnet
- Number built: 35

History
- First flight: 1926

The Heinkel HD 24 was a training seaplane developed in Germany in the late 1920s. It was a conventional single-bay biplane with equal-span, staggered wings. The fuselage was braced to both the upper and lower wings with a number of struts on its sides, in addition to the normal cabane struts. The pilot and instructor sat in tandem, open cockpits, and the undercarriage consisted of twin pontoons, although this could be readily exchanged for wheels or skis.

Heinkel entered two HD 24s (alongside two HD.5) in the German Seeflugwettbewerb seaplane competition in 1926. One of the HD.24 was the third placed - only three aircraft completed the course and completed all the tests in the 11-day competition- leading to orders by the DVS (for 23 aircraft) and the Swedish Navy. The latter aircraft were to be built in Sweden by Svenska Aero based on two pattern aircraft provided by Heinkel. Before the Swedish examples could be delivered, the Swedish Air Force had assumed responsibility for Swedish naval aviation, and so took delivery of the six domestically produced machines, designating them Sk 4.

One HD 24 was exported to China, and another was bought by German explorer Gunther Plüschow who named it Tsingtau and took it on an expedition in 1927–28 to Patagonia and Tierra del Fuego. The journey was recorded in his book and documentary film Silberkondor über Feuerland. A full size replica of the Tsingtau D1313 is being assembled for static display as of April 17, 2009, in Puerto Madero, Buenos Aires, Argentina. It is located at about 500 of Alicia Moreau de Justo Avenue. This replica was located in the Aeroclub of Ushuaia, Province of Tierra del Fuego, Argentine; during a visit to the aeroclub on 5 November 2022 it was reported to have been scrapped. A new replica is being built for in El Calafate, Province of Santa Cruz, Argentine. It will be locate in the Glaciarium.

== Variants ==
- Sk 4 - HD 24 for Swedish service with Mercedes D.IIIa engine (2 built by Heinkel, 4 by Svenska Aero)
  - Sk 4A - Sk 4 with Junkers L 5 engine (2 built by Svenska Aero, plus 3 converted from Sk 4)
  - Sk 4B - Sk 4 with Armstrong Siddeley Puma engine (3 converted from Sk 4)

== Operators ==
Sweden

- Swedish Air Force (former)
- Swedish Navy (former)

== Specifications (HD 24a landplane) ==
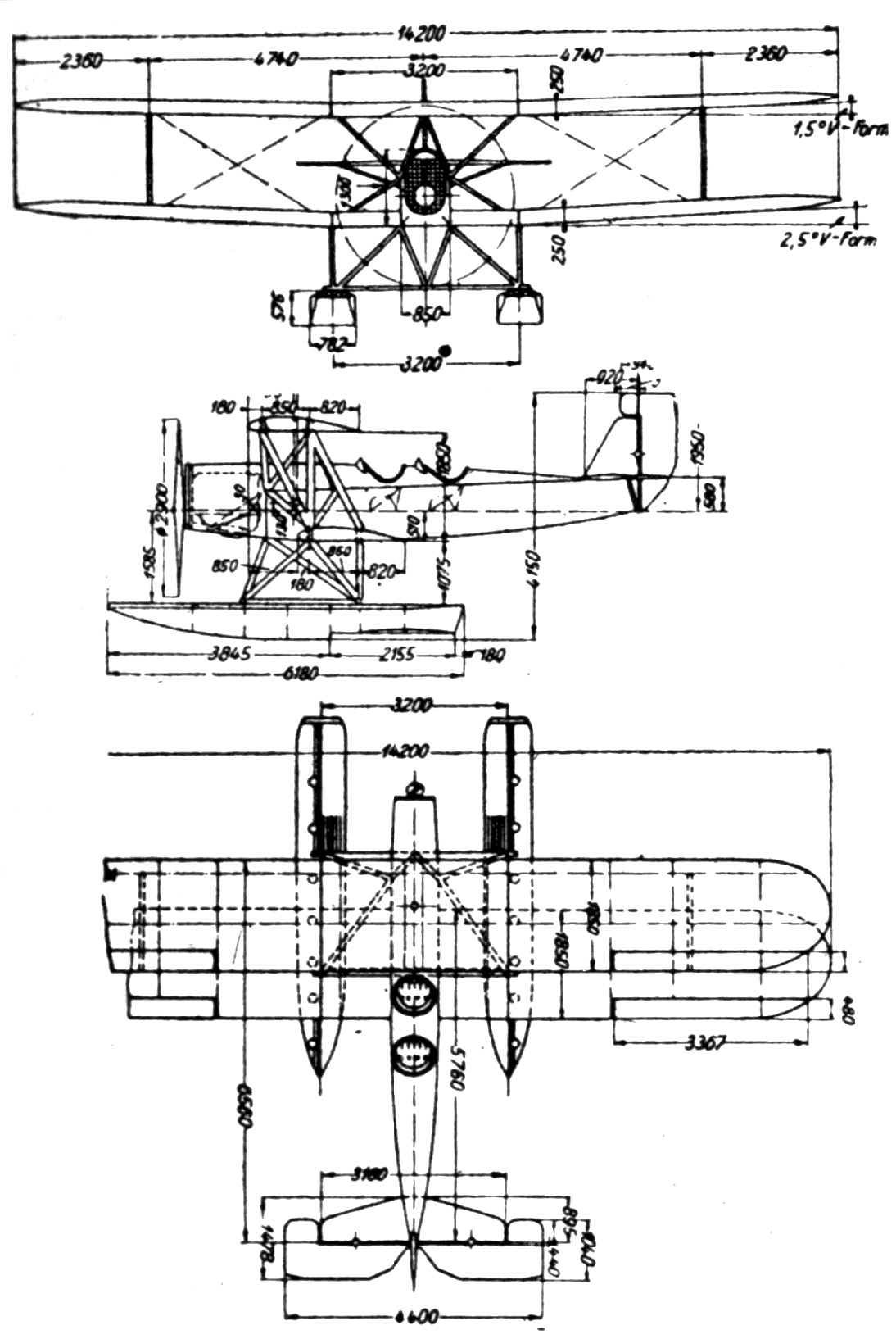
Heinkel HD 24 3-view drawing from Le Document aéronautique October,1926

Data from

General characteristics

- Crew: 2
- Length: 8.60 m (28 ft 3 in)
- Wingspan: 14.2 m (46 ft 7 in)
- Height: 3.84 m (12 ft 7 in)
- Wing area: 50.1 m^{2} (539 sq ft)
- Empty weight: 1,300 kg (2,866 lb)
- Gross weight: 2,150 kg (4,740 lb)
- Powerplant: 1 × BMW IV 6-cyl. water-cooled in-line piston engine, 235 kW (315 hp)

Performance

- Maximum speed: 180 km/h (110 mph, 97 kn)
- Range: 600 km (370 mi, 320 nmi)
- Service ceiling: 4,500 m (14,800 ft)
- Rate of climb: 4.3 m/s (850 ft/min)
