= ASJA Viking II =

Viking II
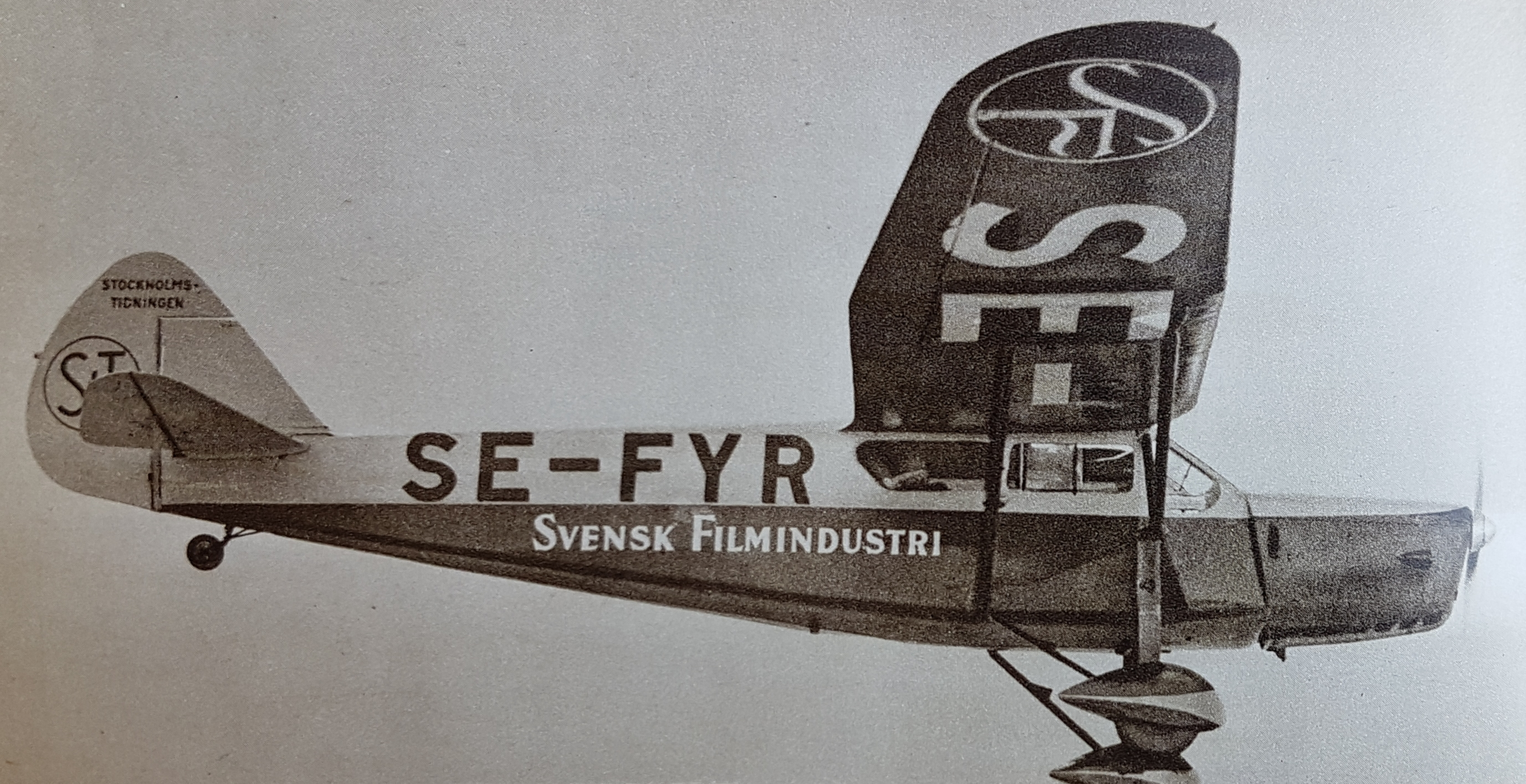

General information
- Type: Utility aircraft
- Manufacturer: ASJA

The ASJA Viking II was a four-seat light aircraft built in Sweden in the early 1930s. It was a development of the Viking, a high-wing braced cabin monoplane of taildragger configuration. It was available with either wheeled or float undercarriage.

== Specifications ==
General characteristics

- Crew: one pilot
- Capacity: 2-3 passengers
- Powerplant: 1 × de Havilland Gipsy Six inline engine , 150 kW (200 hp)
