= AB Svenska Järnvägsverkstädernas Aeroplanavdelning =

Former Swedish aircraft manufacturing company

AB Svenska Järnvägsverkstädernas Aeroplanavdelning (English: Swedish Railroad Workshops' Air Plane Department), commonly shortened to ASJA, was a Swedish aircraft manufacturing company.

Based in Linköping, Sweden, it was established during late 1930 as a subsidiary venture of the industrial conglomerate AB Svenska Järnvägsverkstäderna (English: Swedish Railway Workshops Co). production activity centred around licensed production of aircraft designed by other companies, but it also pursued its own designs, such as the ASJA L1 Viking and ASJA Viking II. In 1936, ASJA held discussions with Bofors towards creating a common company for design and manufacturing of aircraft; on 31 March 1937, the two companies formed the short-lived AB Förenade Flygverkstäder (AFF). During 1939, ASJA was acquired and integrated into a new entity, Svenska Aeroplan AB (more commonly known as SAAB).

== History ==
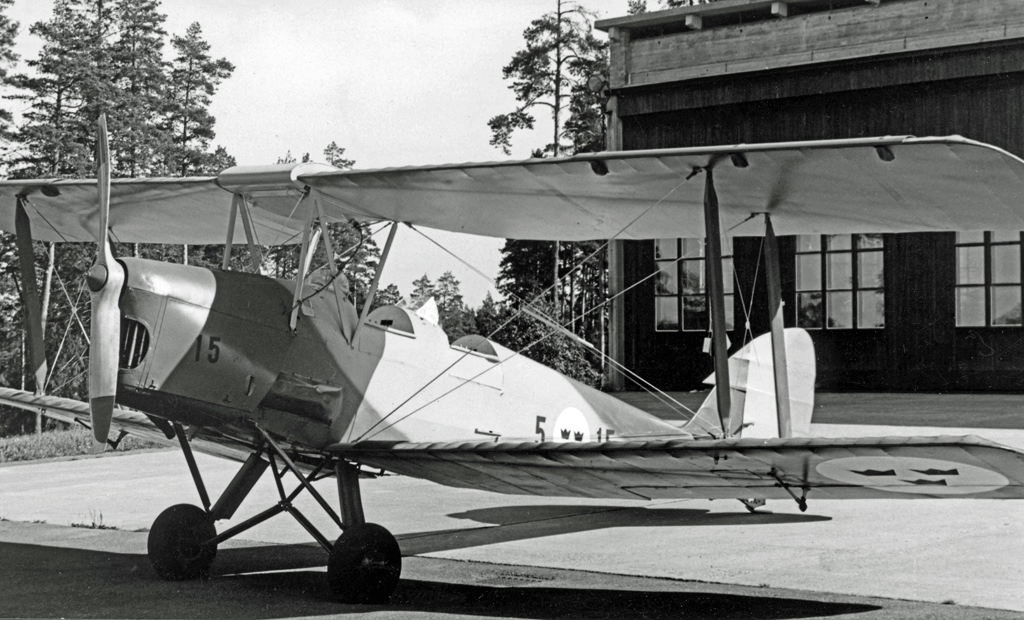
De Havilland Tiger Moth built by ASJA in 1935 for the Royal Swedish Air Force

AB Svenska Järnvägsverkstädernas Aeroplanavdelning (ASJA) was originally founded as a subsidiary company of the industrial conglomerate AB Svenska Järnvägsverkstäderna (English: Swedish Railway Workshops Co). This parent company had specialised in the building of rolling stock and locomotives for Sweden's expanding railway network, had expanded to become the dominant industry in Linköping by the 1920s. This decade saw a downturn in business, which motivated the company's directors to pursue a strategy of diversification into new markets and opportunities; accordingly, it began manufacturing heating boilers, hot water heaters and heat exchangers, under the Parca brand name. During September 1930, the company's board issued a formal decision to establish its own aircraft manufacturing venture as an individual division.

Initially, this new division was small in scale, having less than a hundred employees during 1933. During this era, wood was remained one of the most important construction components in aircraft, thus over a quarter of ASJA's workshop staff were carpenters. Early production activity centred around licensed production of aircraft designed by other companies, but it also pursued its own designs, such as the ASJA L1 Viking and ASJA Viking II. While the company was directed to share its knowledge and design experiences with other Swedish ventures, such as Svenska Aeroplan AB, ASJA were allegedly reluctant to disclose such expertise, thus such cooperation was limited.

During 1936, the Swedish Riksdag had decreed that a total of 257 combat aircraft and 80 trainer aircraft should be procured by 1943 for the Swedish Air Force; the lure of a sizable order on offer drew attention not only from ASJA but rival aircraft manufacturers as well. ASJA entered talks with Bofors on the topic of creating a common company for design and manufacturing of aircraft; accordingly, in January 1937, they agreed to share the stock between them 50–50. On 31 March 1937, the two companies formed AB Förenade Flygverkstäder (AFF). This new entity was intended to undertake the development and design of new aircraft in relation to the demands of the Swedish Air Force, while production activity was to be divided between the two companies' plants in Trollhättan and Linköping.

In addition to participating in the AFF joint venture, some figures within ASJA were keen to continue independently developing their own aircraft designs. During 1938, it became clear that there was a need for a new army and marine reconnaissance aircraft; ASJA decided to submit their ASJA L10 proposal directly, rather than through AFF. This move was viewed as fatal to AFF due to the loss in faith from its circumvention, leading to its winding up during spring 1939. Following this, a complex series of negotiations, acquisitions, mergers, name changes, and relocations were executed in a short space of time; most significant to ASJA was its acquisition and integration into a reformed Svenska Aeroplan AB (more commonly known as Saab).

While this acquisition brought about an end to ASJA's independence as well as the use of its name, its facilities became a core element of the new company's production assets, while several of the aircraft that were designed under its tenure would also be manufactured during this era. Likewise, several former managers of both ASJA and AFF played key roles in the new organisation. The Saab company still operates as an aerospace manufacturer through to the present day.

== Products ==
- ASJA F1
- ASJA L1 Viking
- ASJA L2 (military designation Ö 9)
- ASJA L10 (later became Saab 17)
- ASJA L11 (later became Saab 18)
- ASJA Viking II
- de Havilland DH 82 Tiger Moth
- Focke-Wulf Fw 44J Stieglitz
- Hawker Hart
- North American NA-16
- Northrop 8A-1
- Raab-Katzenstein RK-26 Tigerschwalbe
- Svenska Aero SA-14
- Svenska Aero SA-15
