= Heinkel HE 3 =

1923 sportplane

HE 3

General information
- Type: Sports plane
- National origin: Germany
- Manufacturer: Heinkel

History
- First flight: 1923

The Heinkel HE 3 was a sports aircraft built in Germany in the early 1920s. It was a conventional, low-wing monoplane with seating for three people in two tandem cockpits. The wing was a cantilever design, an unusual and advanced feature for the day. The fixed undercarriage was designed to be quickly changed from wheeled tailskid type to twin pontoons for operation as a seaplane. A HE 3 won first prize in its class at the 1923 aero meet at Gothenburg, and was subsequently selected as a trainer by the Swedish Navy, which bought two examples. In Swedish service, the aircraft gained the nickname Paddan ("Toad").

The HE 3 had fabric-covered wooden wings, and a plywood-covered wooden fuselage.

== Operators ==
Sweden

- Swedish Navy
- Swedish Air Force

== Specifications (HE 3) ==
General characteristics

- Crew: One pilot
- Capacity: 2 passengers
- Length: 7.20 m (23 ft 8 in)
- Wingspan: 12.10 m (39 ft 8 in)
- Gross weight: 1,000 kg (2,205 lb)
- Powerplant: 1 × Siemens-Halske Sh 6 , 105 kW (140 hp)

Performance

- Maximum speed: 150 km/h (94 mph, 82 kn)
