= ASJA L2 =

Ö 9
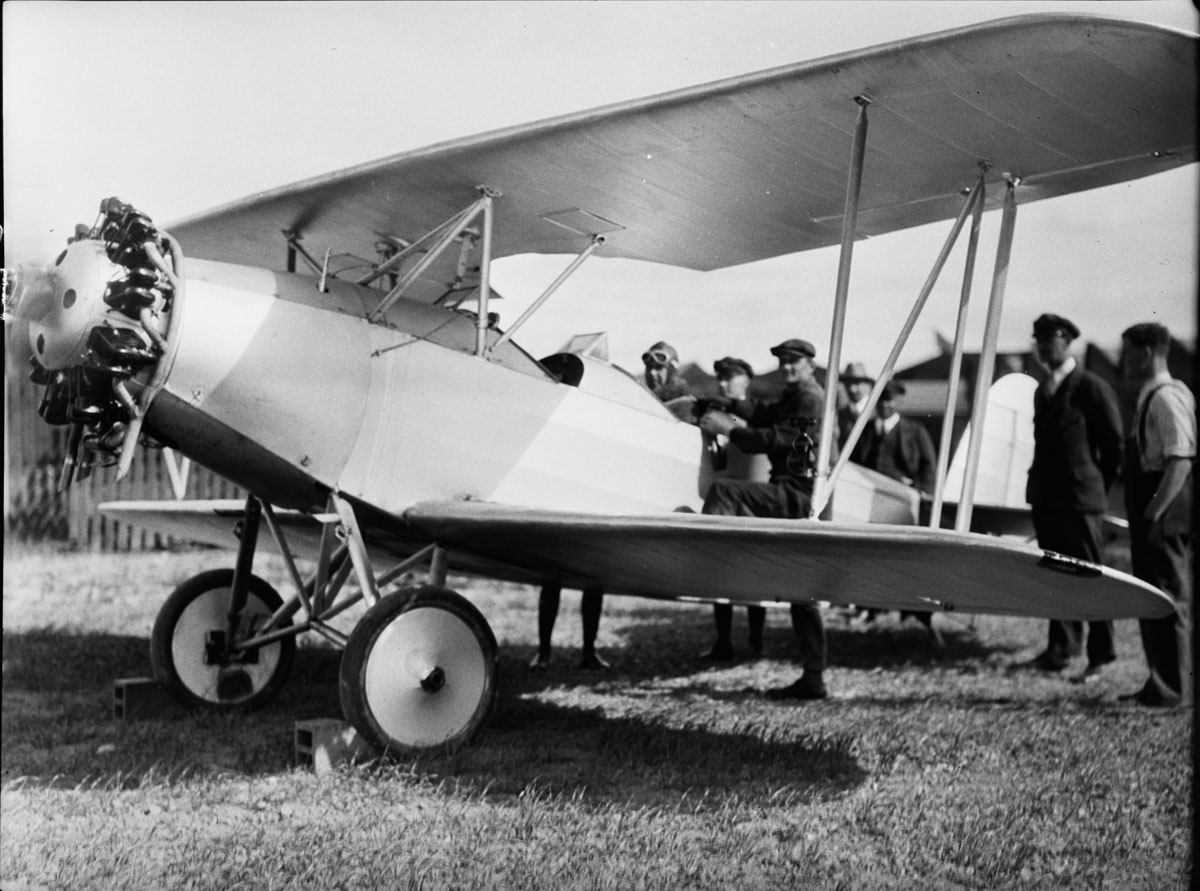

General information
- Type: Military trainer
- Manufacturer: ASJA
- Primary user: Swedish Air Force
- Number built: 2

History
- Introduction date: 1932

The ASJA L2 was a Swedish biplane trainer aircraft built for the Swedish Air Force in the early 1930s. It was designated Ö 9 in that service. The fuselage was of fabric-covered, welded steel tube construction and accommodated the pilot and instructor in tandem open cockpits. The wings were fabric-covered wood and were of staggered, single bay layout.

Only two examples were built, one with wheels and the other with floats. The landplane served until written off in a crash in 1937 and the floatplane until made obsolete in 1940.

== Operators ==
Sweden

- Swedish Air Force

=== Units using this aircraft ===
- Wing F 1 at Västerås
- Wing F 2 at Hägernäs

== Specifications ==
General characteristics

- Crew: two, pilot and instructor
- Length: 9.25 m (30 ft 4 in)
- Wingspan: 12.6 m (41 ft 4 in)
- Gross weight: 1,960 kg (4,320 lb)
- Powerplant: 1 × Wright R-975 radial engine , 250 kW (330 hp)

Performance

- Maximum speed: 175 km/h (110 mph, 96 kn)
