= Heinkel HD 14 =

HD 14
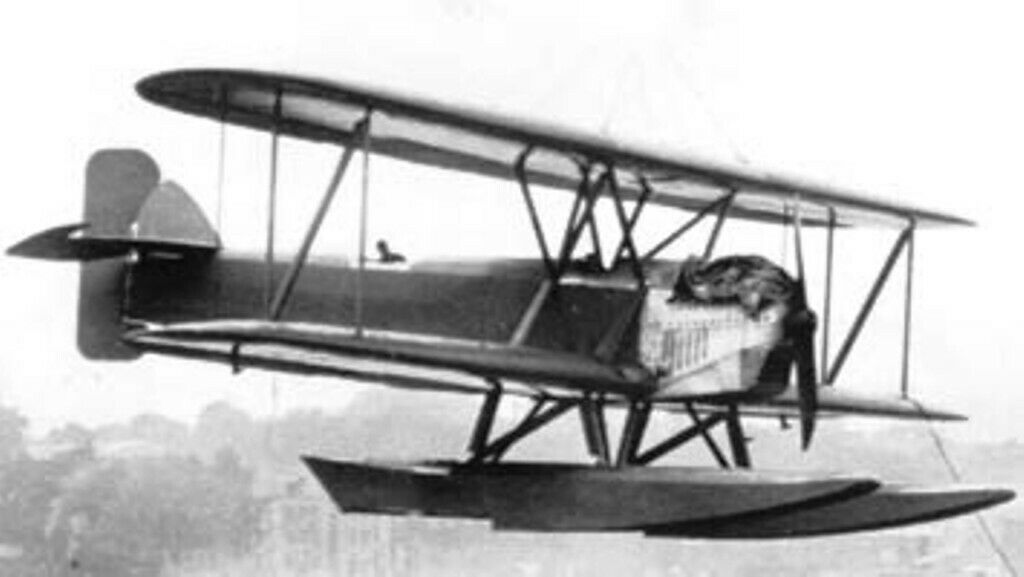

General information
- Type: Reconnaissance aircraft
- National origin: German-Swedish
- Manufacturer: Svenska Aero AB
- Designer: Ernst Heinkel
- Primary user: Reichswehr

History
- First flight: 1924
- Variant: Heinkel HD 16

The Heinkel HD 14 was a single-engine biplane torpedo aircraft developed by the German aviation company Ernst Heinkel Flugzeugwerke in the 1920s, and produced in a single prototype, under license, from Swedish by Svenska Aero in Stockholm.

== Development ==
The Heinkel HD 14 was ordered in 1924, and on September 13, 1925, began flight testing. It was called "Bellona", but given the poor performance, did not meet the needs of the Navy. The aircraft was thus returned to the manufacturer, and was never marked.

== Specifications ==
Data from

General characteristics

- Crew: Two
- Length: 14.7 m (48 ft 3 in)
- Wingspan: 19.0 m (62 ft 4 in)
- Height: 2.60 m (8 ft 6 in)
- Wing area: 103.3 m^{2} (1,112 sq ft)
- Empty weight: 3,400 kg (7,496 lb)
- Gross weight: 5,600 kg (12,346 lb)
- Powerplant: 1 × Fiat A.14 water-cooled W-12, 450 kW (600 hp)
- Propellers: 2-bladed

Performance

- Maximum speed: 175 km/h (109 mph, 94 kn)
- Cruise speed: 150 km/h (93 mph, 81 kn)
- Stall speed: 90 km/h (56 mph, 49 kn)
- Wing loading: 54 kg/m^{2} (11 lb/sq ft)
