= Heinkel HD 16 =

German single-engine biplane torpedo aircraft

HD 16
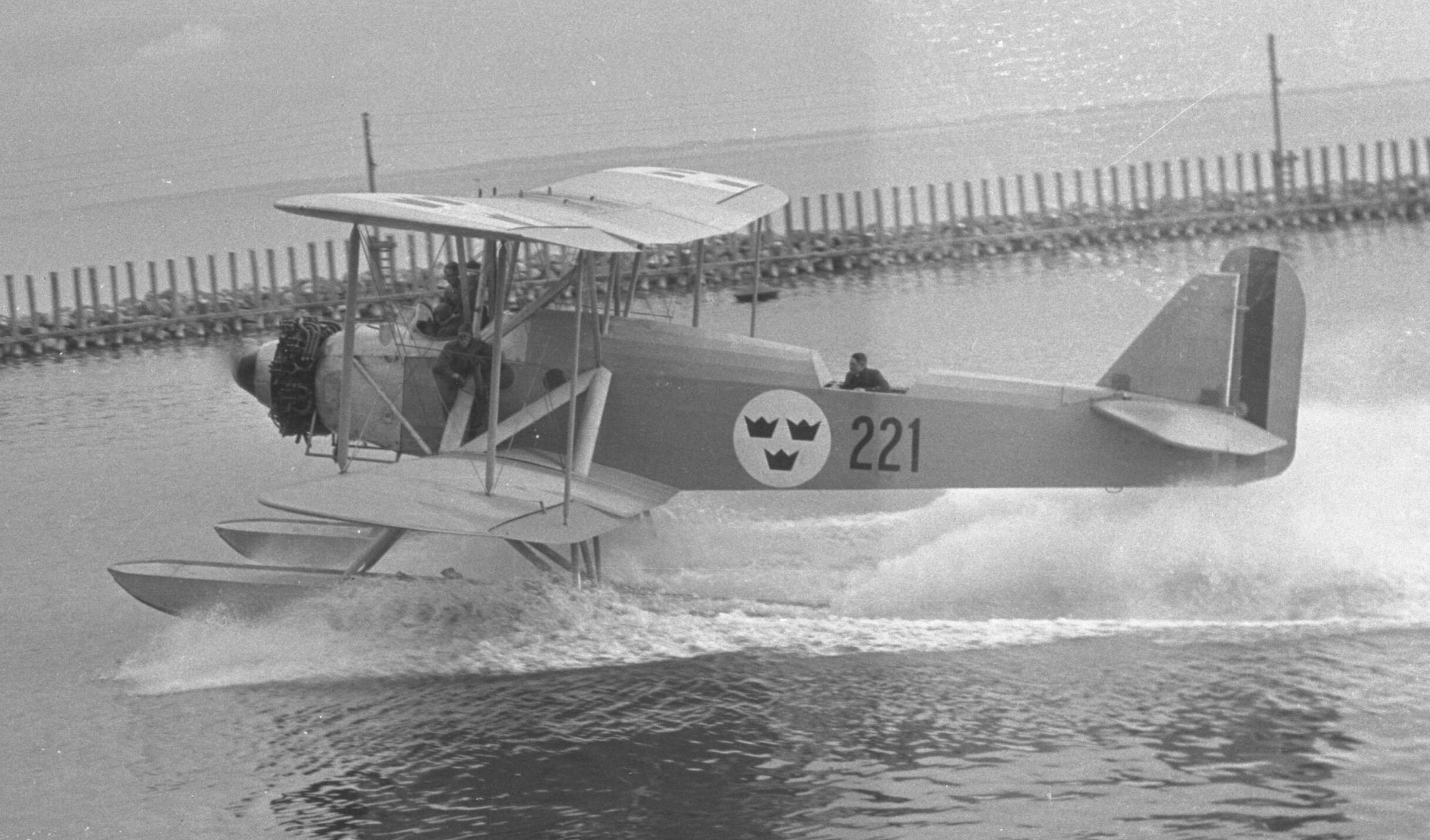
- Heinkel HD 16 in Malmö harbour, 1929

General information
- Type: Reconnaissance aircraft
- National origin: German-Swedish
- Manufacturer: Svenska Aero
- Designer: Ernst Heinkel
- Primary user: Reichswehr
- Number built: 2

History
- First flight: 1928

The Heinkel HD 16 was a single-engine biplane torpedo aircraft developed by the German aviation company Ernst Heinkel Flugzeugwerke in the nineteen-twenties and produced under license by Svenska Aero in Stockholm, Sweden.

== Development ==
The Heinkel HD 16 was an improvised version of the company's earlier Heinkel HD 14. Two HD 16s were built and sold to the Swedish Navy and designated T 1. The T 1 was equipped with two 14-cylinder Armstrong Siddeley Leopard radial engines with 666 Horsepower. The plane carried a m / 17 type torpedo. This torpedo was built in Sweden, had a caliber of 45 cm and weighed about 800 kg. The aircraft was also armed with a 7.7 mm machine gun. On delivery, the pilot and the observer were placed side by side. The cockpit was subsequently modified in tandem to allow a better view for the observer.

== Specifications ==
Data from

General characteristics

- Crew: Three
- Length: 13 m (42 ft 8 in)
- Wingspan: 18 m (59 ft 1 in)
- Height: 5.2 m (17 ft 1 in)
- Wing area: 96.9 m^{2} (1,043 sq ft)
- Empty weight: 2,570 kg (5,666 lb)
- Gross weight: 4,570 kg (10,075 lb)
- Powerplant: 1 × Armstrong Siddeley Leopard , 497 kW (666 hp)
- Propellers: 2-bladed

Performance

- Maximum speed: 196 km/h (122 mph, 106 kn)
- Service ceiling: 4,000 m (13,000 ft)
- Wing loading: 47 kg/m^{2} (9.6 lb/sq ft)
