= Heinkel HE 5 =

Reconnaissance floatplane

HE 5
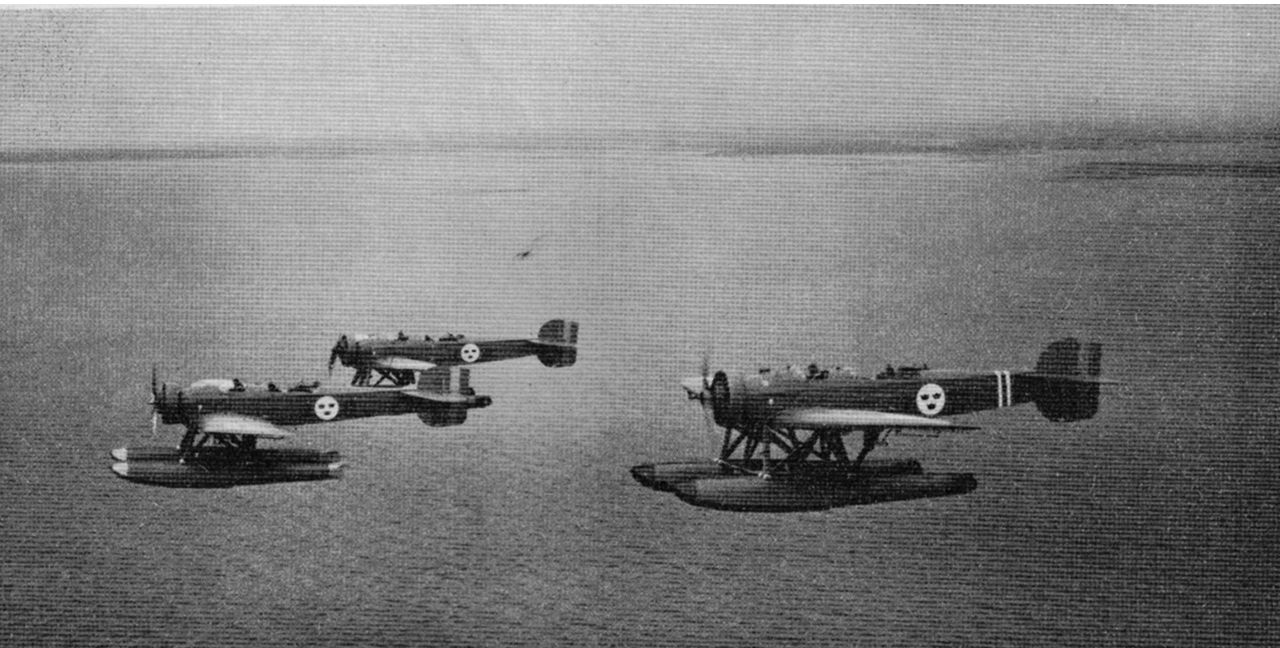
- Swedish Air Force HE 5 S5C

General information
- Type: Reconnaissance floatplane
- National origin: Germany
- Manufacturer: Heinkel, Svenska, Focke-Wulf, Swedish Air Force
- Primary user: Swedish Air Force

History
- First flight: 1926

The Heinkel HE 5, produced in Sweden as the Svenska Aero S 5 and nicknamed the "Hansa", was a reconnaissance floatplane built during the 1920s. It was a further development of the HE 1, sharing its same basic configuration as a low-wing, strut-braced monoplane. The HE designation also refers to the monoplane construction, standing for Heinkel Eindecker.

== Development ==
The HE 5 built upon Heinkel's experiences of mixed construction as used on the H steel tube, and wooden wings largely skinned in alloy. The usual crew carried was just two, pilot and observer seated in tandem, open cockpits; however, some HE 5s also had a third cockpit which could be used to carry a trainee.

Two prototypes were built in 1926, and after initial testing were entered in the German seaplane trials at Warnemünde, winning first and second places in the speed trials. The Swedish Air Force soon ordered the type to supplement the HE 1s, HE 2s, and HE 4 that it had acquired when it took over Swedish naval aviation in 1926, and eventually 40 HE 5s were built under licence by Svenska Aero.

== Operational history ==
In 1927, the Soviet Union also ordered the aircraft, to replace the obsolete flying boats then in service. A prototype was tested on the Black Sea in March the following year, where it was discovered that the aircraft's performance was significantly lower than had been specified by Heinkel. Modifications were made to a second prototype, and this was flight tested in November. This led to an order in quantity soon thereafter, but they did not remain in service long, being phased out by 1930.

In Germany, however, the type remained in service until 1933, with machines licence-built by Focke-Wulf equipping clandestine naval aviation units disguised as training schools for airlines.

An S5 scored the only kill during WWII for the Swedish Air Force. On 21 April 1940 a S5A piloted by Lt Curt Andersson and the Observer/gunner second lt H Olsen, shot down a Heinkel He 111P (B3+FN) of 5./KG 54 at Marstrandsfjorden. Andersson fired his fixed 7.7 mm gun and hit the right engine of the He 111. The He 111 crewed by Uffz Gunther Golz, Ogfr Erhard Fischer, Ogfr Herbert Schröder och Ogfr Hans Wolf, had to make forced landing. While circling the downed He 111, the rear seat gunner Olsen opened fire with his 7.7 mm machine gun towards the German crew. He was later reported for court martial for this action. However, before this took place, Olsen was killed in an accident in a S12 on 23 September 1941.

All other downed aircraft by Sweden during WWII were due to Anti Aircraft Artillery. The Swedish Volunteer Group in the Winter War, Flygflottilj 19, scored 8 air to air victories against the Soviets, but they are included in the Finnish Air Force total

== Preservation ==
Two HE 5s are preserved in museums - one at the Flygvapenmuseum in Linköping, and one at the Muzeum Lotnictwa Polskiego in Kraków.

== Variants ==
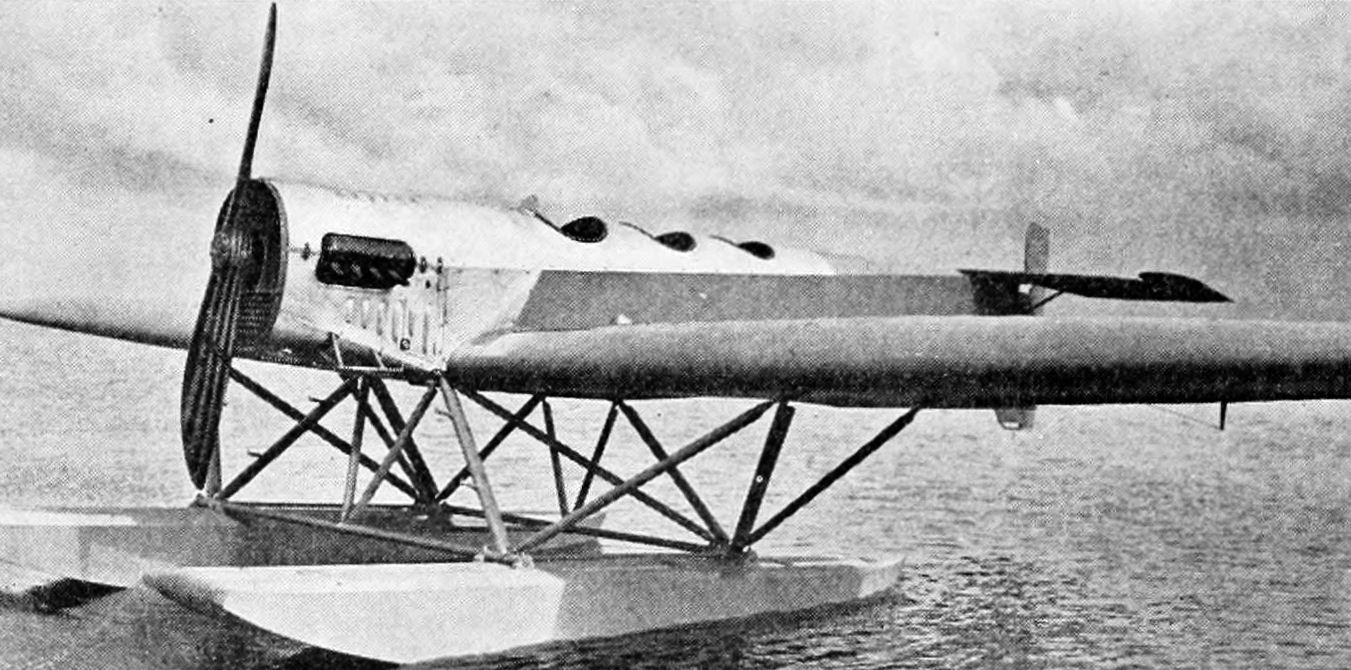
Heinkel He 5a photo from Aero Digest September 1926

=== Germany ===
- HE 5a - prototype with Napier Lion engine (1 built)
- HE 5b - production version with Gnome et Rhône 9A Jupiter radial engine
- HE 5c - production version for Soviet Union with BMW VI engine
- HE 5e - version with BMW VI engine (7 built)
- HE 5f - Focke-Wulf version with BMW VI engine for German clandestine military units

=== Sweden ===
- S 5 - Bristol Jupiter-powered two-seater (4 built by Svenska Aero)
- S 5A - S 5 with three seats and a radio set (12 built by Svenska Aero, plus 10 built by Swedish Air Force itself)
- S 5B - version with NOHAB-built Bristol Pegasus engine (1 built by Swedish Air Force)
- S 5C - refinement of S 5B with Townend ring, new cockpit and tail design, and new floats built by Short Brothers (9 built by Swedish Air Force)
- S 5D - refinement of S 5C with more powerful engine and new propeller (4 built by Swedish Air Force)

== Operators ==
Soviet Union

- Soviet Air Force - Two aircraft, used for tests and trials.

Sweden

- Swedish Air Force

== Specifications (HE 5c) ==
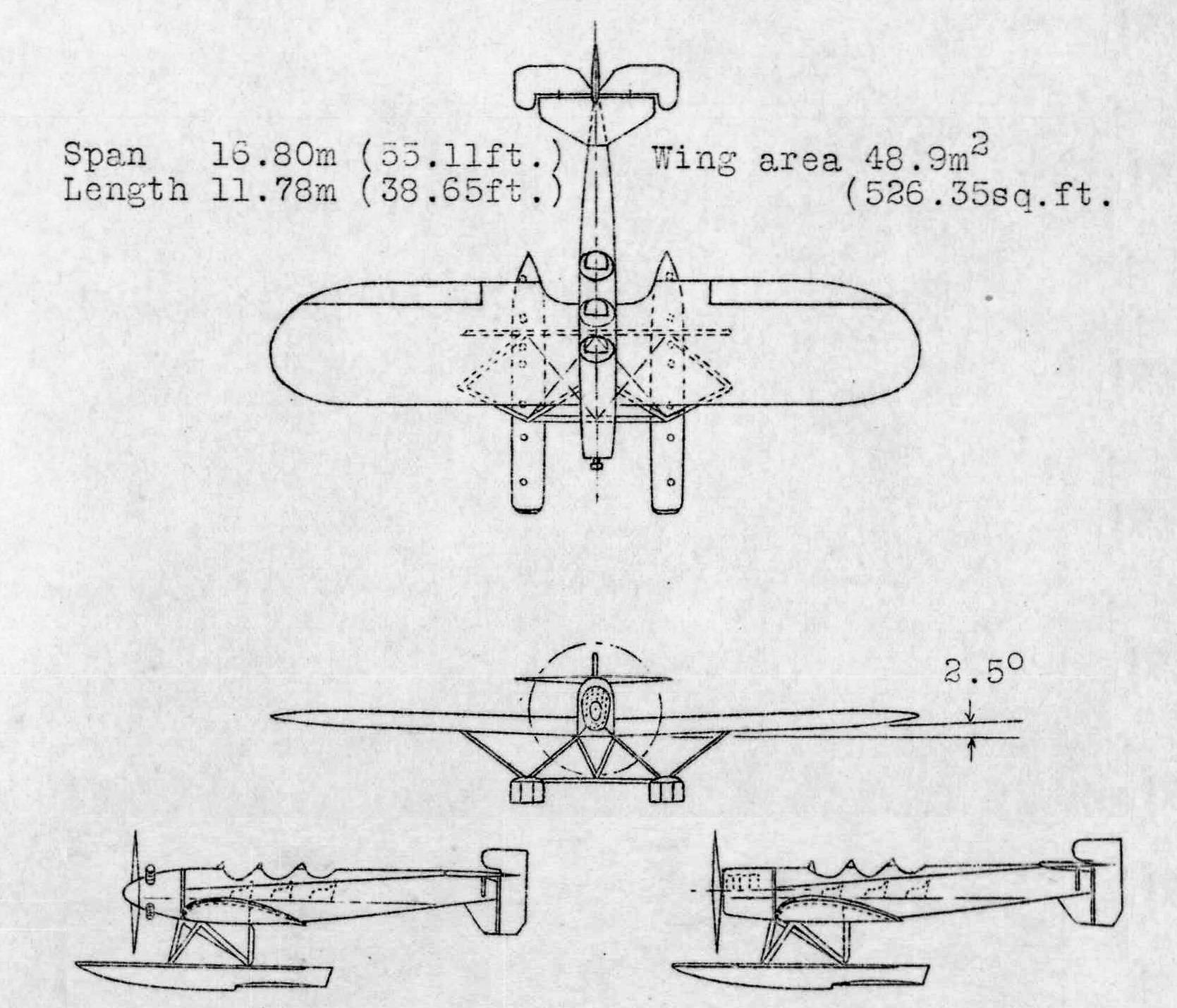
Heinkel HE 5a and HE 5b 3-view drawing from NACA Aircraft Circular No.38

General characteristics

- Crew: Two, pilot and observer
- Length: 12.18 m (40 ft 0 in)
- Wingspan: 16.80 m (55 ft 1 in)
- Height: 4.38 m (14 ft 4 in)
- Wing area: 48.9 m^{2} (526 sq ft)
- Empty weight: 2,000 kg (4,409 lb)
- Gross weight: 2,900 kg (6,393 lb)
- Powerplant: 1 × BMW VI , 360 kW (480 hp)

Performance

- Maximum speed: 200 km/h (125 mph, 109 kn)
- Cruise speed: 168 km/h (104 mph, 91 kn)
- Range: 550 km (340 mi, 300 nmi)
- Service ceiling: 5,500 m (18,000 ft)
- Rate of climb: 4.8 m/s (940 ft/min)

Armament

- 1 × fixed, forward-firing 7.7 mm (.303 in) Vickers machine gun
- 2 × trainable, rearward-firing 7.7 mm (.303 in) Lewis Guns on ring mount for observer
- 160 kg (350 lb) of bombs carried under rear fuselage
