= FVM J 23 =

J 23
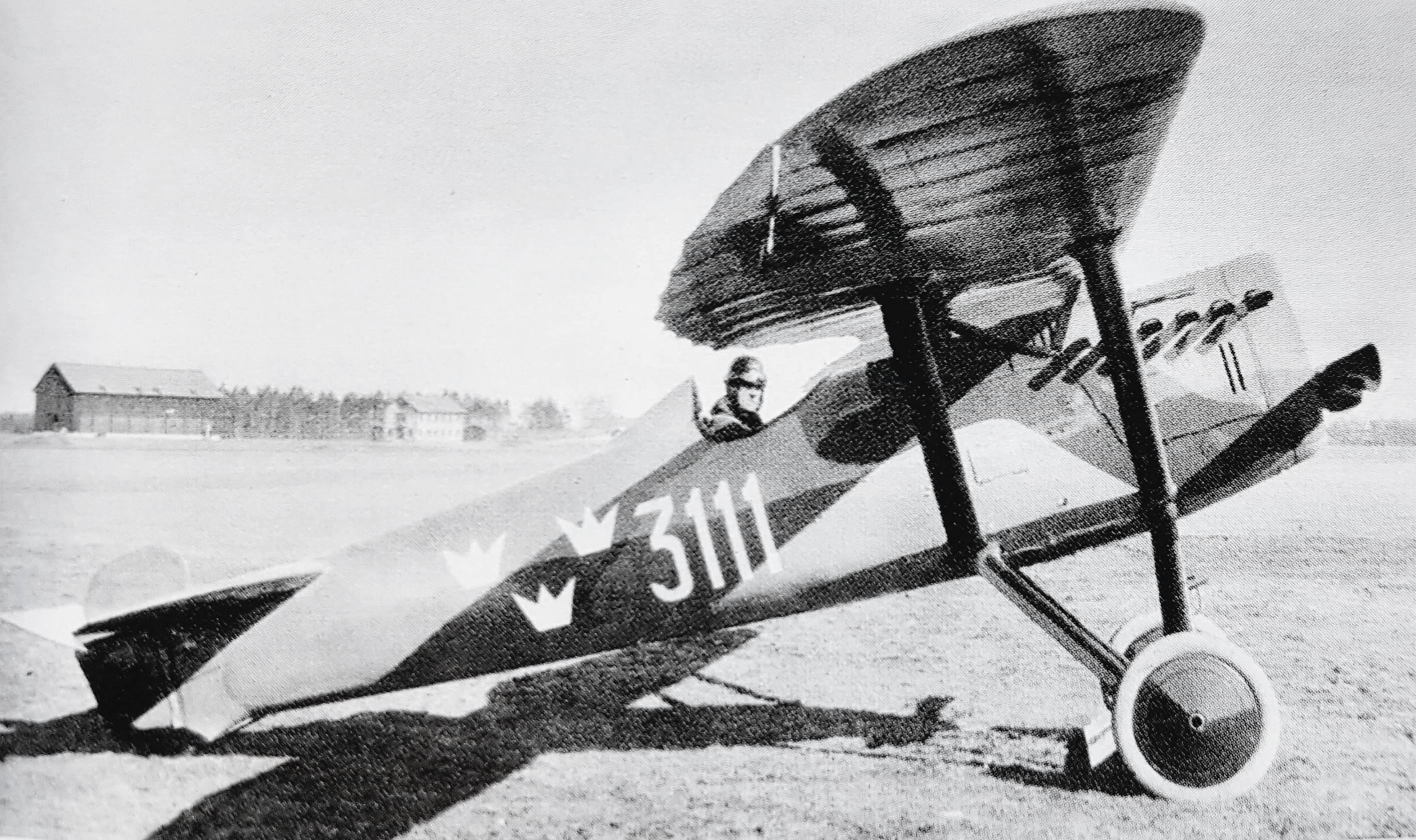

General information
- Type: Fighter aircraft
- National origin: Sweden
- Manufacturer: Flygcompaniets Verkstäder at Malmen (FVM)
- Designer: Henry Kjellson and Ivar Malmar
- Number built: 5

History
- First flight: June 1923

The FVM J 23 was a Swedish single seat, single engine, parasol wing fighter aircraft built in the mid-1920s. Five were flown but the type never reached operational status because of structural concerns raised by a fatal accident.

== Design and development ==
The parasol wing of the J 23 had a thick airfoil section, a straight leading edge and a trailing edge which curved forwards to elliptical tips. In the central region the wing became thinner and the chord decreased in front of the cockpit. It was of wooden, two spar construction and plywood covered apart from the ailerons. These were angled, fabric covered and small but slotted to improve their efficiency. Parallel pairs of airfoil section flying struts ran on each side from the lower fuselage to the wing spars at about one third span. Over the fuselage a pair of N-form cabane struts leaned inwards to meet at the wing's centre.

Like the wing, the fuselage and empennage of the J 23 were wooden structures. The elliptical cross section fuselage consisted of pre-shaped, stress bearing plywood panels around a light framework of frames and stringers. The pilot's open cockpit was just aft of the trailing edge, from where he could see both over the wing and through the narrow gap between wing and fuselage. The six cylinder BMW IIIa engine had a fixed pair of machine gun over it in the forward fuselage and its honeycomb radiator was in the nose, with the propeller shaft set low. This was a high compression engine which could only develop full power at altitude, enabling the J 23 to fly high and fast. Its top speed was claimed to be 220 km/h (137 mph) at 1,000 m (3,280 ft) but 250 km/h (155 mph) at 3,000 m (9,840 ft). The 8 mm (0.3 in) m/22 were synchronized, firing through the propeller. At the rear the ply covered fin was surprisingly small and low, though the fabric covered rudder extended down to the keel. The rudder carried a trim tab. The J 23's cantilever, low aspect ratio, D-shaped, ply covered tailplane was mounted on top of the fuselage, carrying balanced elevators with cut outs for rudder movement.

Its fixed undercarriage had mainwheels on a rigid axle, rubber sprung from the crosspiece between two tall V-form legs mounted on the fuselage at the same points as the interplane struts. The axle and crosspiece were enclosed within an airfoil section fairing, which provided some additional lift.

The J 23 first flew in June 1923 and was tail heavy, a fault rectified by an increase in length (several sources, e.g. put the length at about 6.90 m (22 ft 8 in) but L'Aérophile, a year after the first flight, gives 8.50 m (27 ft 11 in)). By July five examples had been built and all appeared at the Gothenburg International Aero Show late in that month. On 10 August 1923 one set a Swedish altitude record of 8,000 m (26,247 ft). Military testing proceeded until 15 March 1924, when there was a fatal, structural wing failure on one J 23. Though work on the aircraft continued and some modifications like an increase in tail area were made, the J 23 was thereafter seen as too fragile for service use.

Work had also been proceeding on the J 24, similar to the J 23 but with a much more powerful 224 kW (300 hp) Hispano-Suiza 8F V-8 engine. Following the J 23 accident, the sole J 24 was converted into a single bay biplane designated the J 24B. It was flown in 1925 but, overweight, its performance was not good enough to interest the military.

== Variants ==
Data from Green and Swanborough p. 235

J 23
Five BMW powered aircraft, first modified then scrapped after the March 1924 accident.
J 24
Similar to the J 23 but with a more powerful, 224 kW (300 hp) Hispano-Suiza 8F V-8. One only.
J 24B
The J .24 rebuilt after the March 1924 J 23 accident as a biplane. One only, flown in 1925.

== Specifications ==
Data from Green and Swanborough p.235

General characteristics

- Crew: One
- Length: 6.90 m (22 ft 8 in)
- Wingspan: 11.24 m (36 ft 11 in)
- Height: 2.55 m (8 ft 4 in)
- Wing area: 18.0 m^{2} (194 sq ft)
- Empty weight: 771 kg (1,700 lb)
- Gross weight: 985 kg (2,172 lb)
- Powerplant: 1 × BMW IIIa 6 cylinder inline engine, watercooled, 138 kW (185 hp)
- Propellers: 2-bladed

Performance

- Maximum speed: 197 km/h (122 mph, 106 kn)
- Service ceiling: 8,000 m (26,000 ft)
- Time to altitude: 9.3 minutes to 3,000 m (9,840 ft)

Armament

- Guns: 2× m/22 fixed 8 mm (0.315 in) machine guns, fitted with synchronization gear and firing through the propeller.

== Bibliography ==
- Cortet, Pierre (November 1997). "Rétros du Mois" [Retros of the Month]. Avions: Toute l'aéronautique et son histoire (in French) (56): 5. ISSN 1243-8650.
- Forsgren, Jan (July 2020). "Swewden's Parasol Fighters: The FVM J 23 & J 24/J 24B". The Aviation Historian (32): 114–118. ISSN 2051-1930.
