= Heinkel HE 1 =

Two-seat floatplane

HE 1
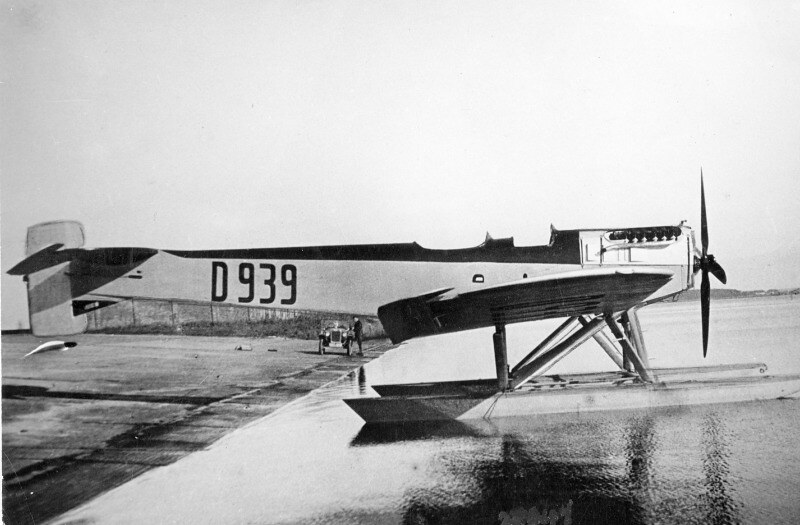

General information
- Type: Reconnaissance floatplane
- National origin: Germany
- Manufacturer: Caspar-Werke
- Designer: Ernst Heinkel
- Primary user: Swedish Navy (Marinen )
- Number built: 14

History
- First flight: 1923

The Heinkel HE 1 or Caspar S 1 was a two-seat, low-wing monoplane floatplane, designed in 1921 by German designer Ernst Heinkel at Caspar-Werke.

The HE 1 was produced under licence in Sweden for the Marinen (Swedish Navy) in 1921 as the Svenska S.2. The HE 1 was powered by a 179 kW (240 hp) Maybach Mb.IVa engine; one test aircraft was powered by a Siddeley Puma engine.

== Specifications ==
Data from

General characteristics

- Crew: Two (pilot & observer/gunner)
- Length: 12.65 m (41 ft 6 in)
- Wingspan: 18 m (59 ft 1 in)
- Height: 3.85 m (12 ft 8 in)
- Empty weight: 1,700 kg (3,748 lb)
- Gross weight: 2,320 kg (5,115 lb)
- Powerplant: 1 × Maybach Mb IVa 6-cylinder water-cooled inline piston engine, 190 kW (260 hp)

Performance

- Maximum speed: 160 km/h (99 mph, 86 kn)
- Service ceiling: 4,000 m (13,000 ft)
- Time to altitude: 1,000 m (3,300 ft) in 9 minutes

Armament
1 × flexible machine gun in rear cockpit

== Operators ==
Sweden

- Swedish Navy
- Swedish Air Force
