= Östgöta Wing =

Coordinates: 58.4083°N 15.5175°E

- Östgöta flygflottilj
- Active: 1926–1974
- Country: Sweden
- Allegiance: Swedish Armed Forces
- Branch: Swedish Air Force
- Type: Corps (1926–1936); Wing (1936–1974)
- Role: Recon wing (1926–1948); Fighter wing (1948–1974)
- Part of: 1st Air Command (1938–1940); 3rd Air Command (1948–1957); 2nd Air Command (1957–1966); Eastern Military District (1966–1974)
- Garrison/HQ: Malmslätt
- Motto(s): Labor-Effectus-Vigor (Latin: "Work-Efficiency-Well-being")

Insignia
- Roundel

Aircraft flown
- Fighter: J 1, J 2, J 3, J 5, J 6, J 9, J 11, J 28A, J 29, J 32, J 35
- Multirole helicopter: Hkp 3B
- Reconnaissance: S 1, S 6, S 14, S 16, S 17, S 18, S 22
- Trainer: Sk 5, Sk 6, Sk 8, Sk 9, Sk 11, Sk 12, Sk 14, Sk 16, Sk 50
- Transport: Tp 5, Tp 52, Tp 79, Tp 83, Tp 85
- G 101, Se 102, Se 103, Se 104, A 1, P 1, Ö 1, Ö 3, Ö 4, Ö 6, Ö 9

Östgöta Wing (Swedish: Östgöta flygflottilj), also F 3 Malmslätt, or simply F 3, is a former Swedish Air Force wing with the main base located at Malmen air base near Linköping in south-eastern Sweden.

== History ==
In August 1912, the first pilot school in Sweden was set up at Malmslätt by Carl Gustav Cederström at the location of the 1st Life Grenadier Regiment (I 4). In 1927, that regiment merged with the 2nd Life Grenadier Regiment and moved to new garrisons in Linköping Town to give room for the newly set up 3rd Flying Corps F 3. The name was changed in 1936 to Östgöta flygflottilj (Östgöta Wing).

Initially, the corps, or wing, operated the S 1, S 6, S 16, S 17, S 18 and S 22 in reconnaissance squadrons until 1948 when it was converted to a fighter wing by converting the S 22s and replacing other reconnaissance aircraft with three squadrons of J 22s.

In 1950, F 3 received the J 28A from Bråvalla Wing (F 13) which was replaced rather quickly with J 29As in 1953. Not until 1965 were they in turn replaced by J 35Ds. One squadron was decommissioned in 1970 and the two remaining were converted to J 35Fs.

The two remaining squadrons of J 35F were moved in 1973 to Blekinge Wing (F 17) when the air wing was decommissioned. The remaining administrative part of the wing was decommissioned in 1974.

The air base was still kept active as a detachment to Bråvalla Wing (F 13) as F 13 M until 1994, to Uppland Wing (F 16) as F 16 M until 2003 and now serving as F 17 M to Blekinge Wing (F 17).

The airfield is known today as Malmen Air Base (ICAO: ESCF). It is currently home to the Swedish Air Force Museum.

== Barracks and training areas ==
The 1st and the 2nd Life Grenadier Regiments' old training area Malmen outside Linköping was taken over and modernized, while the Swedish Air Force Maintenance Depot at Malmslätt (Centrala Flygverkstaden Malmslätt, CFM) retained the parts that belonged to the Aviation Company (Flygkompaniet). The old training heath was the airfield. When the jet fighters were introduced, the first runway was built in an east–west direction. A northbound crossing runway was built in 1969 and became the main runway.

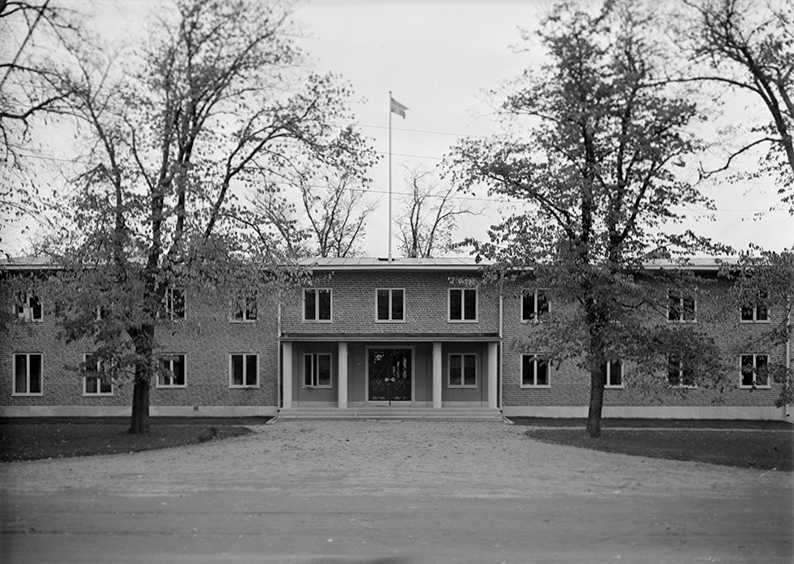
Chancellery building 1940

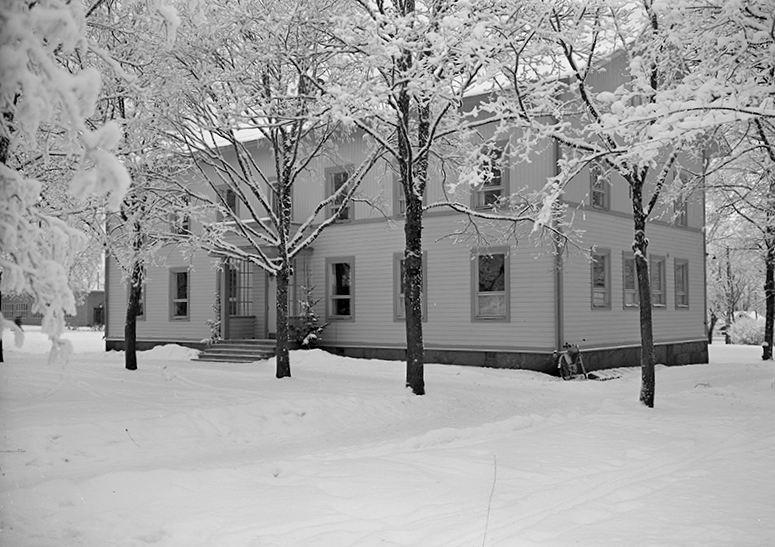
Hospital in 1942

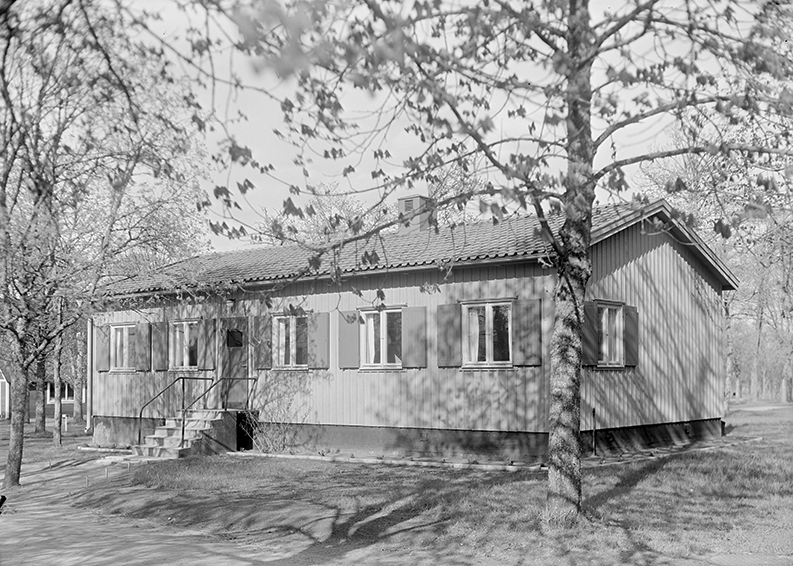
Cadet barracks in 1945

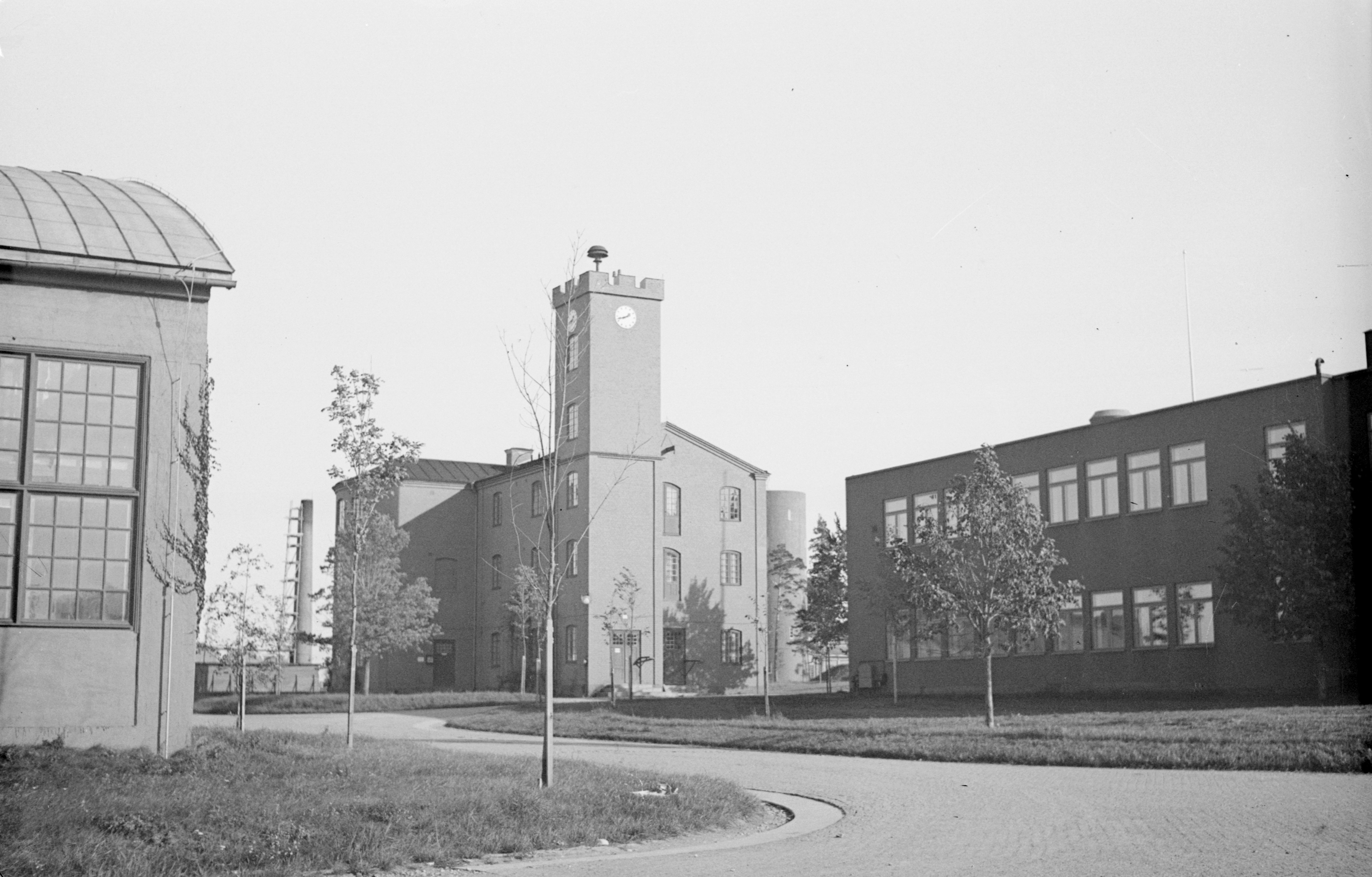
Air Force Maintenance Depot, chancellery and other buildings

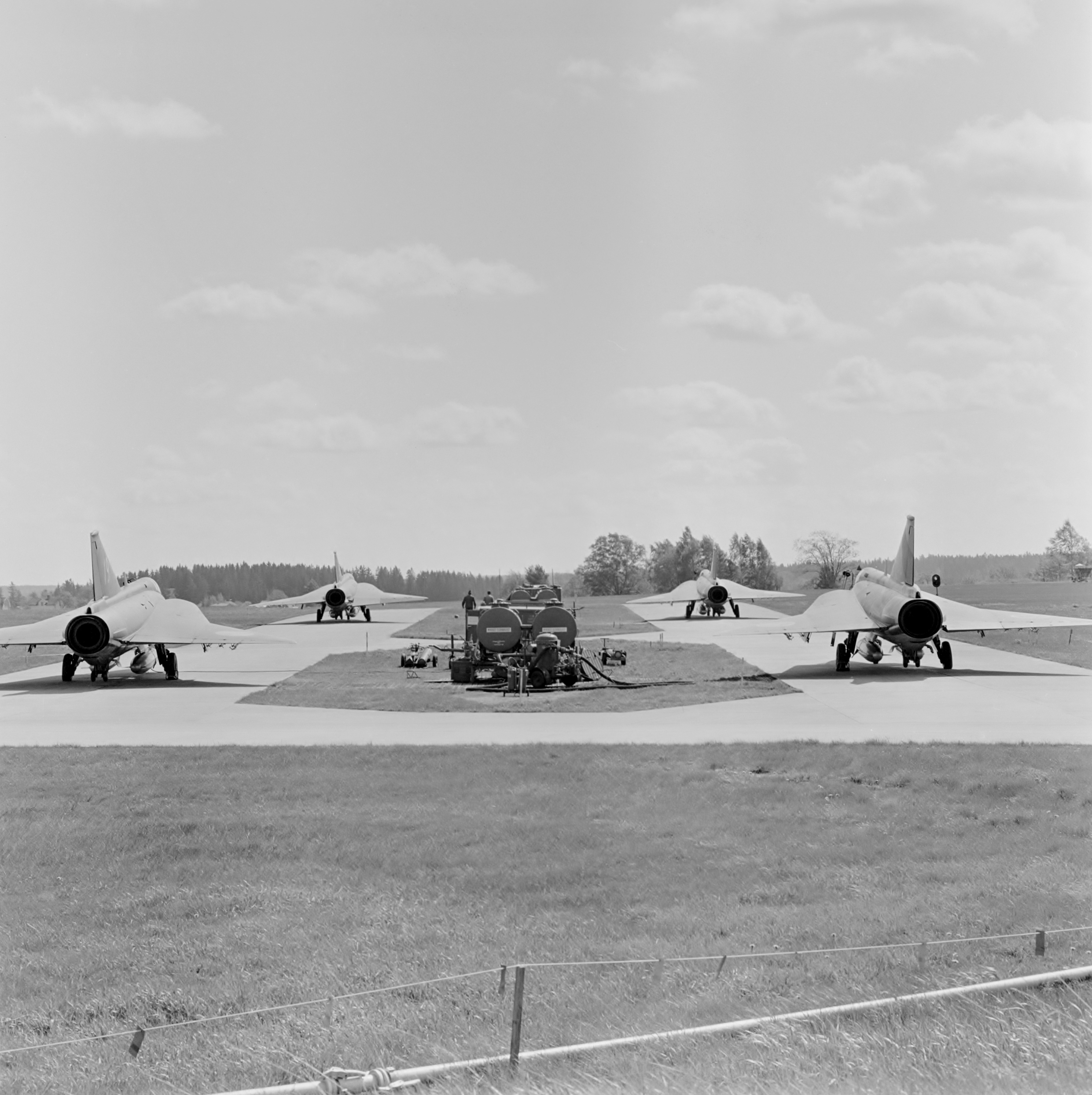
Four Saab 35 Draken's in 1968

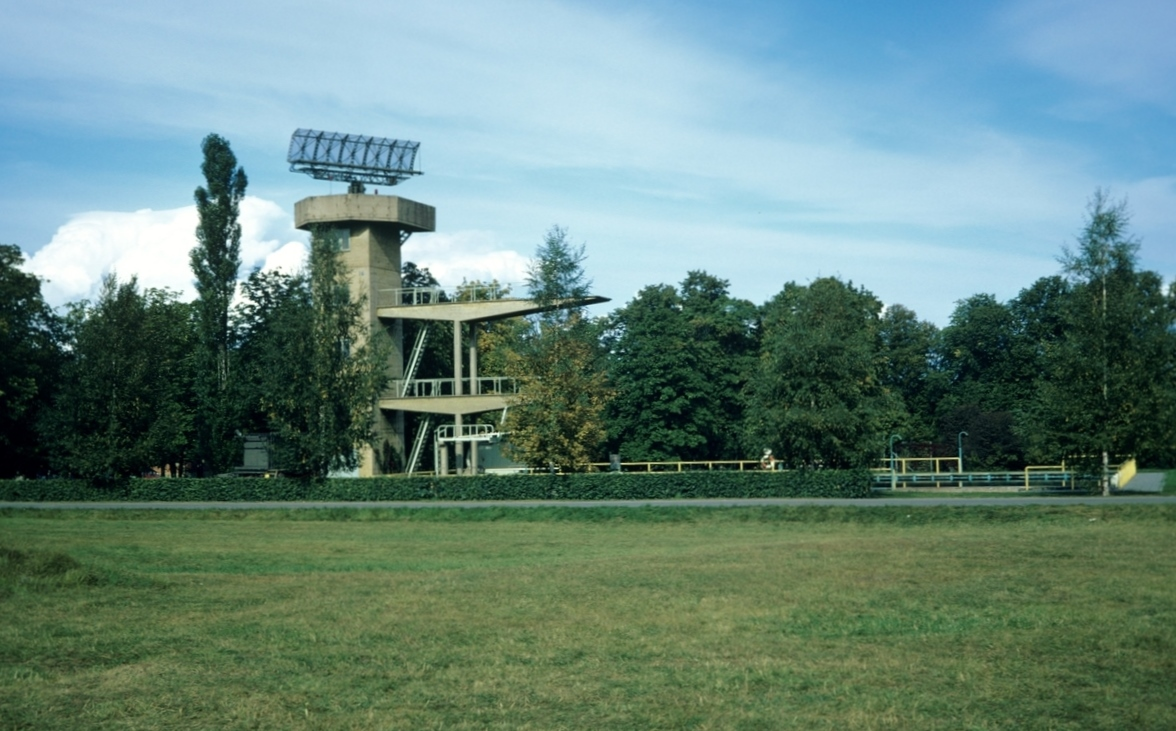
PS-239 radar in 1972

== Heraldry and traditions ==
=== Coat of arms ===
Blazon: "Gules, the provincial badge of Östergötland, a griffin segreant or with dragonwing and tail, armed and langued azure between four roses argent".

=== Colours, standards and guidons ===
A colour was presented on 6 June 1939 at F 8 at Barkarby Airport by His Majesty the King Gustaf V. It was transferred to F 13 in 1974 and is today preserved at the Swedish Army Museum. Blazon: "On blue cloth in the centre the badge of the Air Force; a winged two-bladed propeller under a royal crown proper. In the first corner a griffin segreant or with dragonwing and tail, armed and langued gules between four roses argent".

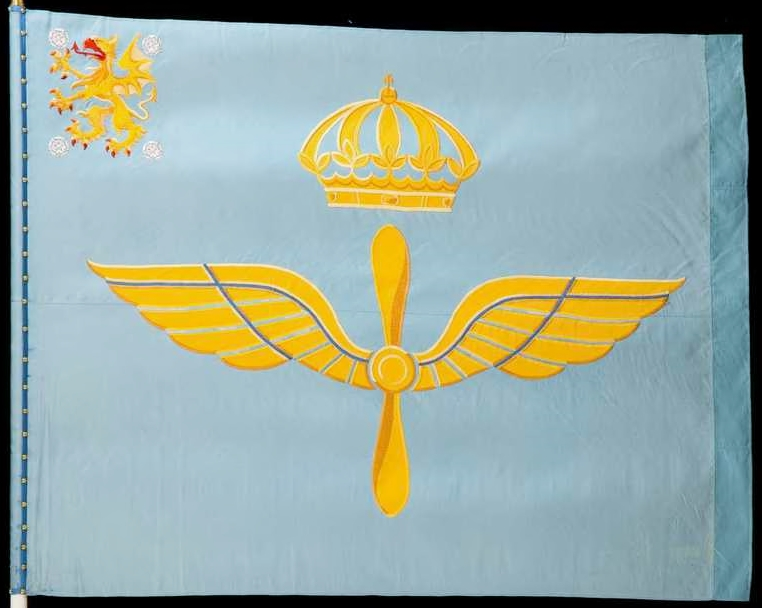
Colour

== Commanding officers ==
Commanding officers from 1926 to 1974. The commanding officer was referred to as flottiljchef ("wing commander") and had the rank of colonel.

- 1926–1926: Gösta von Porat
- 1926–1932: Emil Björnberg
- 1932–1934: Axel Gyllenkrok
- 1934–1941: Gösta von Porat
- 1941–1951: Hugo Beckhammar
- 1951–1952: Lennart Peyron
- 1952–1959: Nils-Magnus von Arbin
- 1959–1962: Åke Sundqvist
- 1962–1965: Bengt Rosenius
- 1965–1971: Olof Knutsson
- 1971–1974: Gösta Norrbohm

== Names, designations and locations ==
Name	Translation	From		To
Tredje flygkåren	3rd Flying Corps	1926-07-01	–	1936-06-30
Kungl. Östgöta flygflottilj	Royal Östgöta Wing; Royal Östgöta Air Group	1936-07-01	–	1974-06-30
Designation		From		To
F 3		1926-07-01	–	1974-06-30
Location		From		To
Malmslätt		1926-07-01	–	1974-06-30

== See also ==
- List of military aircraft of Sweden
- Swedish Air Force Museum
- wikimapia
