= Uppland Wing =

Unit of the Swedish Air Force

Coordinates: 59.8881°N 17.6064°E

- Upplands flygflottilj
- Active: 1943–2003, 2021–present
- Country: Sweden
- Allegiance: Swedish Armed Forces
- Branch: Swedish Air Force
- Type: Wing (1940–1957); Sector wing (1957–1965); Wing (1965–1981); Great sector wing (1981–1994); Wing (1994–2003)
- Role: Fighter wing
- Part of: 2nd Air Command (1944–1948); 3rd Air Command (1948–1966); Milo Ö (1966–1991); Milo M (1991–2000); OPIL (2000–2003)
- Garrison/HQ: Uppsala/Ärna
- Motto: Labor-Effectus-Vigor (Note: Added in 1971–1973 at the initiative of the then wing commander, Colonel Sven-Olof Olson.) ("Work-Efficiency-Satisfaction")
- March: "Svensk högvakt" (Berg) (Note: The march was adopted in June 1971 and established on 26 April 1976.)

Commanders
- Current commander: COL Pernille Undén

Insignia
- Roundels

Aircraft flown
- Bomber: B 5, B 17
- Fighter: J 22, J 26, J 29, J 32, J 35, JA 37
- Multirole helicopter: Hkp 3B
- Trainer: Sk 11, Sk 12, S 15, Sk 16, S 35, Sk 50, Sk 60
- Transport: Tp 87, Tp 102A
- G 101, Se 102, Se 103, Se 104

Uppland Wing (Swedish: Upplands flygflottilj), also F 16 Uppsala, or simply F 16, is a Swedish Air Force wing with the main base located at Ärna Air Base northwest of Uppsala, Sweden.

== History ==
F 16 was established by buying farmland from Ärna gård and Bärby gård in 1943. The grass fields were used as runways for the air base that was founded in 1944.

The airbase was well outside the city limits of Uppsala at the time of the founding, but because of city growth, it later was adopted in as a suburb under the name Ärna as the population near the base and the city grew together.

The original emblem of F 16 was a golden sheaf of grain on a blue shield, but when F 2 Hägernäs airbase was decommissioned in 1974, F 16 took over its coat of arms of Uppland.

The Swedish government decided in 1996 that the wing with the squadrons would be decommissioned on 31 December 2003. The base was thereafter still active with various military schools. The base was also home to F 20 Uppsala Air Force Academy.

The wing was re-raised and was inaugurated on 14 October 2021 to the tunes from Uppland Home Guard Music Band (Upplands hemvärnsmusikkår). The wing was inaugurated by Prince Carl Philip, Duke of Värmland. The Supreme Commander of the Swedish Armed Forces, General Micael Bydén and the Minister of Defence Peter Hultqvist also attended the inauguration. The ceremony ended with a formation flight over Uppsala Garrison and downtown Uppsala. It was carried out by the Swedish Air Force Historic Flight (SWAFHF), together with the Swedish Armed Forces. The formation consisted of older aircraft models that had been active in Uppland Wing over the years.

== Heraldry and traditions ==
=== Coat of arms ===
The first coat of arms of the Uppland Wing was used from 1943 to 1994. Blazon: "Azure, the badge of the dynasty Vasa, a ”vase” or". The second coat of arms was used from 1994 to 2003. Blazon: "Gules, the provincial badge of Uppland, an orb or, banded and ensigned with a cross-crosslet, a chief azure over a barrulet or, charged with a winged twobladed propeller of the last colour".

Coat of arms used from 1943 to 1994

Coat of arms used from 1994 to 2003 and from 2021

=== Colours, standards and guidons ===
The units first colour was presented to the wing on 17 September 1944 at F 8 at Barkarby by His Majesty the King Gustaf V. Blazon: "On blue cloth in the centre the badge of the Air Force; a winged two-bladed propeller under a royal crown proper. In the first corner, the badge of the House of Vasa, a ”vase” or".

The units last colour was presented to the wing at the Artillery Yard in Stockholm by the Supreme Commander, General Owe Wiktorin on 30 April 1996. It was handed over to the Uppsala Air Force Training schools (F 20) as a traditional colour when F 16 was disbanded on 31 December 2003. The colour is drawn by Ingrid Lamby and manufactured by machine in appliqué technique by the Engelbrektsson Flag factory. Blazon: "On blue cloth in the centre the badge of the Air Force; a winged two-bladed propeller under a royal crown proper. In the first corner the provincial badge of Uppland; an orb, banded and ensigned with a cross crosslet and in the second corner a seven-pointed star (a legacy from seven disbanded wings: the former Västmanland Wing (F 1), Roslagen Wing (F 2), Östgöta Wing (F 3), Svea Wing (F 8), Södermanland Wing (F 11), Bråvalla Wing (F 13) and Södertörn Wing (F 18). All décor in yellow.

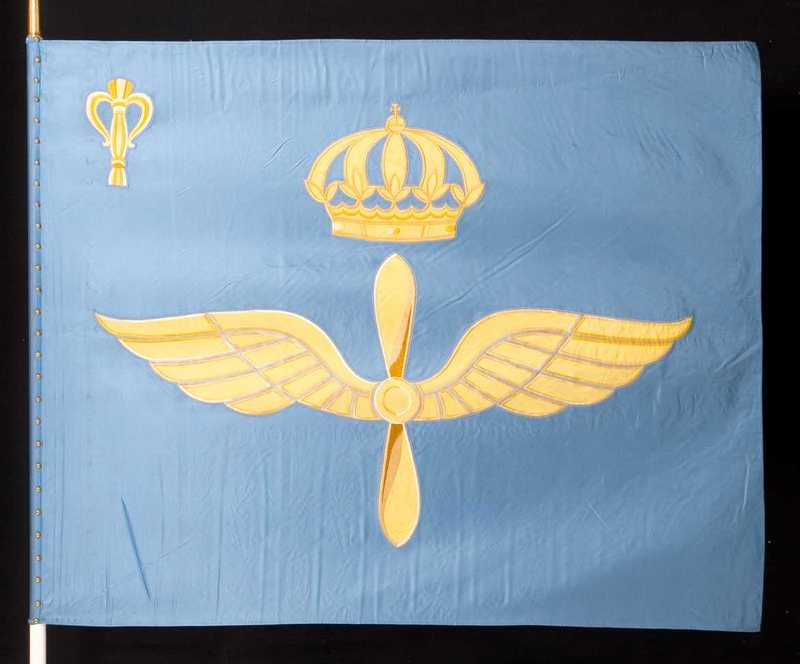
Colour used from 1943 to 1996

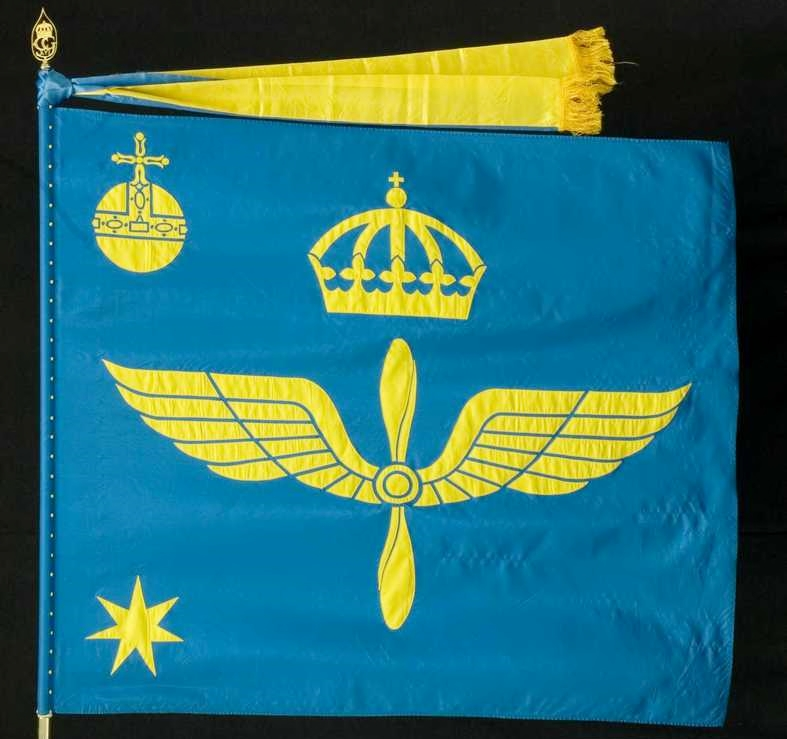
Colour used from 1996 to 2003

=== March ===
”Upplands flygflottiljs marsch” with the work name ”Svensk högvakt” was composed around 1950 by the music director Per Berg and was adopted on 15 June 1971 and established on 26 April 1976.

=== Medals ===
In 2003, the Upplands flygflottiljs (F 16) minnesmedalj ("Uppland Wing (F 16) Commemorative Medal") in bronze (UpplffljBMM) of the 8th size was established. The medal ribbon is of blue moiré with a yellow stripe on the middle and a broad red stripe on each side. The wing coat of arms is attached to the ribbon.

== Commanding officers ==
From 1943 to 1981, the commanding officers was referred to as flottiljchef ("wing commander"), and had the rank of colonel. From 1981 to 1994, the wing commander was referred to as sektorflottiljchef ("sector wing commander") and had the rank of senior colonel. From 1994 to 2003, the commanding officer was again referred to as flottiljchef ("wing commander"), and had the rank of colonel.

=== Wing and sector wing commanders ===
- 1943–1944: Bengt Jacobsson
- 1944–1952: Knut Lindahl
- 1952–1964: Karl-Erik Karlsson
- 1964–1967: Björn Hedberg
- 1967–1971: Gösta Norrbohm
- 1971–1973: Sven-Olof Olson
- 1973–1976: Jan-Henrik Torselius
- 1976–1978: Bertil Nordström
- 1978–1985: Karl-Erik Fernander
- 1985–1989: Rolf Gustafsson
- 1989–1990: Arne Hansson
- 1990–1994: Stig Dellborg
- 1994–1997: Ulf Sveding
- 1997–1999: Mats Nilsson
- 1999–2002: Tommy Pålsson
- 2002–2003: Christer Olofsson
- 2004–2021: –
- 2021–20xx: Pernille Undén

=== Deputy sector wing commanders ===
In order to relieve the sector wing commander, a deputy sector wing commander position was added in 1981. Its task was to lead the unit procurement, a task largely similar to the old wing commander position. Hence he was also referred to as flottiljchef ("wing commander"). The deputy sector wing commander had the rank of colonel. On 30 June 1994, the deputy sector wing commander position was terminated.

- 1981–1983: Lars-Erik Englund
- 1983–1985: Jan-Olov Gezelius
- 1985–1988: Hans Hagberg
- 1988–1990: Swen Persson
- 1990–1992: Kjell Nilsson
- 1992–1993: Ulf Sveding

== Names, designations and locations ==
Name	Translation	From		To
Kungl. Upplands flygflottilj	Royal Uppland Wing	1943-07-01	–	1974-12-31
Upplands flygflottilj	Uppland Wing; Uppland Air Group	1975-01-01	–	2003-12-31
Upplands flygflottilj	Uppland Wing	2021-10-14	–	
Designation		From		To
F 16		1943-07-01	–	1957-09-30
F 16/Se O3		1957-10-01	–	1965-??-??
F 16		1965-??-??	–	1981-06-30
F 16/Se M		1981-07-01	–	1993-06-30
F 16/FK M		1993-07-01	–	1994-06-30
F 16		1994-07-01	–	2003-12-31
F 16		2021-10-14	–	
Location		From		To
Ärna Air Base		1943-07-01	–	2003-12-31
Ärna Air Base		2021-10-14	–	

== See also ==
- List of military aircraft of Sweden
