= Bråvalla Wing =

Coordinates: 58°36′39″N 16°06′13″E

- Bråvalla flygflottilj
- Active: 1943–1994
- Country: Sweden
- Allegiance: Swedish Armed Forces
- Branch: Swedish Air Force
- Type: Wing (1940–1957); Sector wing (1957–1981); Wing (1981–1994)
- Role: Fighter wing (1943–1976); Fighter/Recon wing (1976–1994)
- Part of: Third Air Group (1944–1966); Milo Ö (1966–1991); Milo M (1991–1994)
- Garrison/HQ: Norrköping/Bråvalla
- Mottos: Altius Citius Pericula Commoda Suscipientes ("Higher and faster we take moderate risks")
- March: "Nordiska spelen" (Rydberg)

Insignia
- Roundel

Aircraft flown
- Bomber: B 5, B 17
- Fighter: J 8, J 11, J 22, J 28A, J 29, J 32, J 35, JA 37
- Reconnaissance: SF 37, SH 37
- Trainer: S 12, Sk 15, Sk 16, Sk 50
- Transport: Tp 45, Tp 79, Tp 83, Tp 85
- G 101, P 1, Se 102, Se 103, Se 104

Bråvalla Wing (Swedish: Bråvalla flygflottilj), also F 13 Norrköping, or simply F 13, is a former Swedish Air Force wing with the main base located near Norrköping in south-eastern Sweden.

== History ==
The Air Wing was established in 1943 as the fourth fighter wing, and the thirteenth wing in total, in the Swedish Air Force.

The location had been mapped out in 1941 and consisted of purchased land from Sörby, Knivberga and Ringstad farmsteads. In 1942, preparation work on the almost square 1000 m by 1000 m grass air field was started and completed in September 1943. The main administration was housed inside Norrköping main hotel until the first office buildings were completed in 1945. The wing was given the name Bråvalla as a tie to the Battle of Bråvalla in 770.

The first fighter squadrons were set up by the Italian built J 11 in 1943 which was quickly replaced by the Swedish built J 22 in 1944.

In 1946, F 13 became the first wing in the Swedish Air Force to convert to jets with the J 28. It was later also first wing to introduce J 29 and J 35 in service in 1951 and 1960 respectively.

In 1976 a new reconnaissance squadron was set up with a combined SF/SH 37 fleet and in 1980, F 13 was yet again the first wing to receive the JA 37.

On June 3, 1992 the decision was made to decommission the squadrons on June 30, 1993 and the remaining wing administration on June 30, 1994.

=== F 13 today ===
The airfield is today known as Norrköping-Bråvalla airfield (ICAO: ESCK). It is currently administered by Blekinge Wing (F 17) and is mainly used as a storage facility for obsolete equipment. The underground facility called Berget (The mountain) is still being maintained and could hold a number of fighters. One of the runways is still operational and can be reactivated.

== Heraldry and traditions ==
=== Coat of arms ===
"Or, the town badge of Norrköping, sitting on a throne gules, a Saint Olof image dressed azure, crown or and halo, axe and orb azure."

=== Colours, standards and guidons ===
==== Wing colour ====
The first colour was presented to the wing at Svea Air Corps (F 8) at Barkarby Airport by His Majesty the King Gustaf V on 17 September 1944. Blazon: "On blue cloth in the centre the badge of the Air Force; a winged two-bladed propeller under a royal crown proper, all in yellow. In the first corner a saint seated on a bench with a crown on his head, an ax in his right hand and an orb in his left, all or, halo and axe argent." Decor through inserting and embroidery.

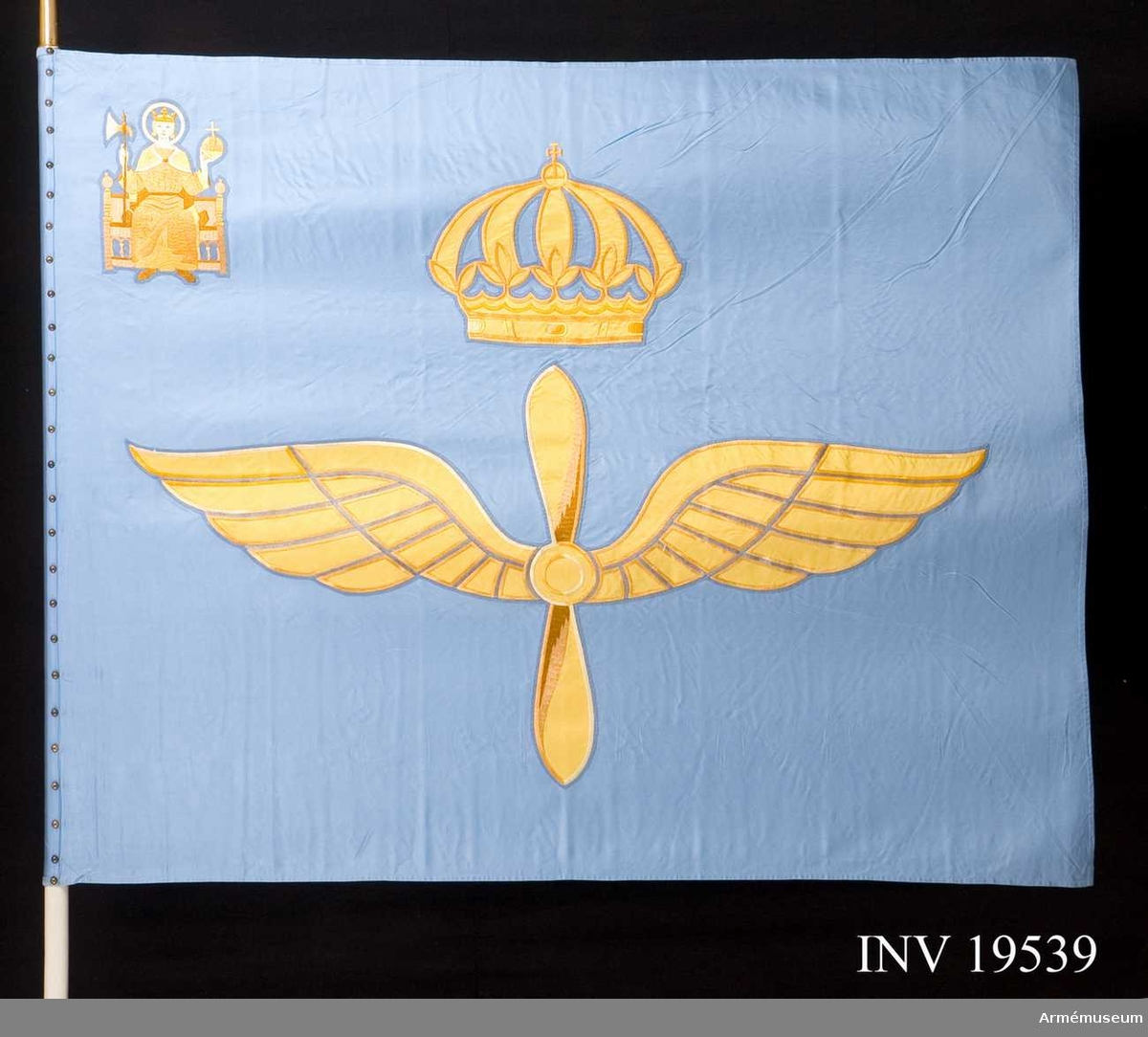
The 1938 colour

==== Traditional colours ====
The wing had the colour of Östgöta Wing (F 3) from 1974 to 1994 and the colours of Södermanland Wing (F 11) from 1980 to 1994 as traditional colours.

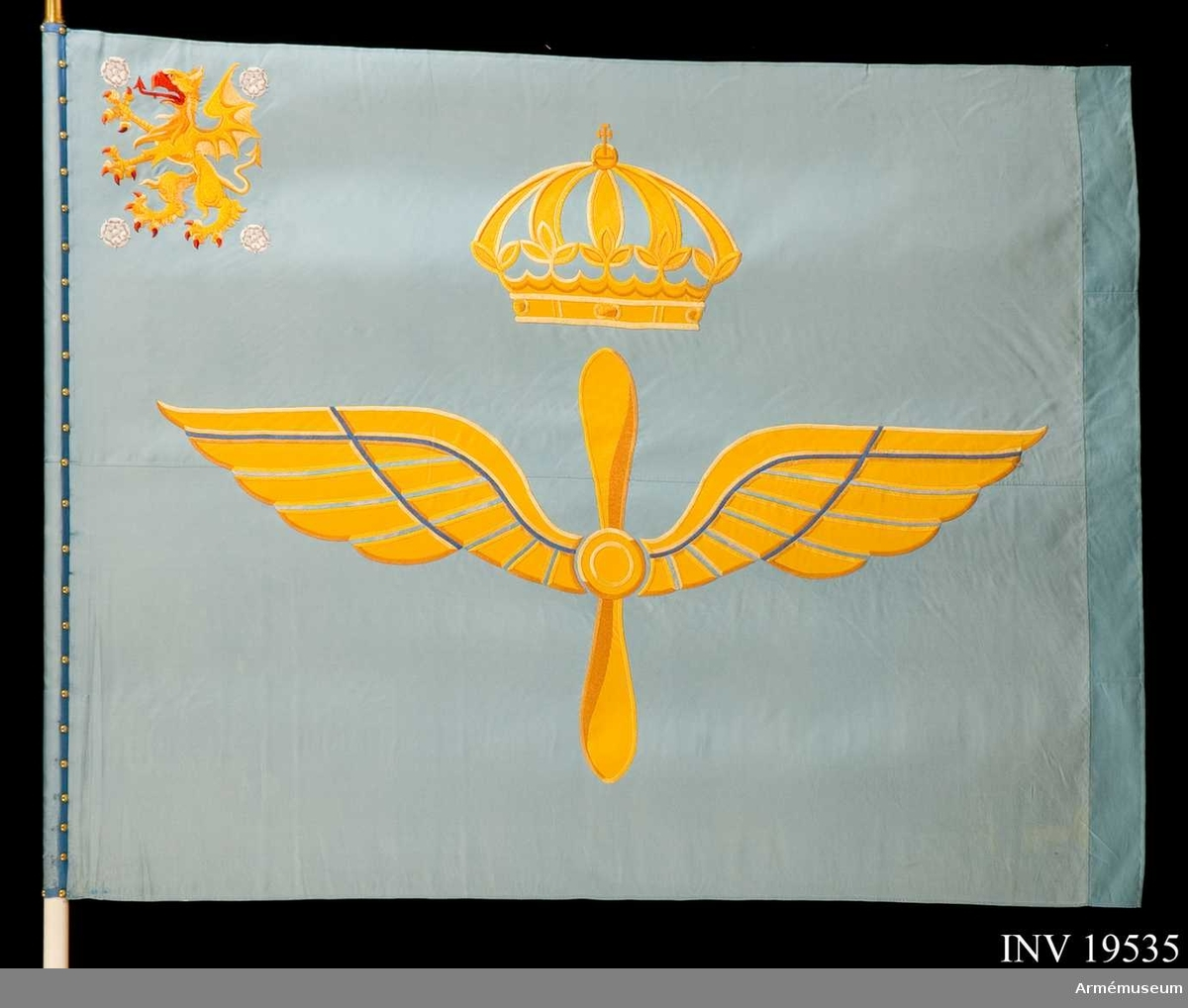
Colour of Östgöta Wing (F 3)

=== March ===
”Bråvalla flygflottiljs marsch” composed around 1920s by Sam Rydberg under the name "Formering till tåg" and dedicated to Crown Prince Gustaf Adolf in 1926. The march, which was also given the title "Nordiska spelen", was used as a regimental march of the Life Grenadier Regiment from 1929 to 1933 and then as a defiliation march. It was adopted and established as march for Bråvalla Wing on 4 April 1986.

== Commanding officers ==
From 1943 to 1977, the commanding officers was referred to as flottiljchef ("wing commander") and had the rank of lieutenant colonel. From 1951, the wing commander at F 13 received the rank of colonel. From 1977 to 1981, the wing commander was referred to as sektorflottiljchef ("sector wing commander") and had the rank of senior colonel. From 1981 to 1994, the commanding officer was again referred to as flottiljchef ("wing commander"), and had from 1991 the rank of colonel.

=== Wing and sector wing commanders ===
- 1943–1947: Lage Thunberg
- 1947–1948: Grels Naeslund
- 1948–1950: Ante Söderlindh
- 1950–1959: Frank Cervell
- 1959–1964: Nils-Magnus von Arbin
- 1964–1966: Hans Neij
- 1966–1966: Gunnar Rissler
- 1966–1979: Carl Norberg
- 1980–1984: Kurt Hagerström
- 1984–1987: Börje Björkholm
- 1987–1991: Hermann Schulz
- 1991–1994: Göte Pudas

=== Deputy sector wing commanders ===
In order to relieve the sector wing commander, a deputy sector wing commander position was added in 1977. Its task was to lead the unit procurement, a task largely similar to the old wing commander position. Hence he was also referred to as flottiljchef ("wing commander"). The deputy sector wing commander had the rank of colonel. On 30 June 1981, the deputy sector wing commander position was terminated.

- 1977–1979: Bengt Lönnbom
- 1979–1981: Stig Abrahamsson

== Names, designations and locations ==
Name	Translation	From		To
Kungl. Bråvalla flygflottilj	Royal Bråvalla Wing	1943-07-01	–	1974-12-31
Bråvalla flygflottilj	Bråvalla Wing; Bråvalla Air Group	1975-01-01	–	1994-06-30
Designation		From		To
F 13		1943	–	1957-09-30
F 13/Se O1		1957-10-01	–	1981-06-30
F 13/Se G1		1957-10-01	–	1965-??-??
F 13		1981-07-01	–	1994-06-30
Location		From		To
Bråvalla Airport		1943-07-01	–	1994-06-30

== See also ==
- Swedish Air Force
- List of military aircraft of Sweden
