= Claes-Ulrik Winberg =

Swedish industrialist (1925–1989)

- Born: 23 September 1925; Copenhagen, Denmark
- Died: 31 May 1989 (aged 63); National road 53, Sweden
- Education: Technical University of Denmark
- Occupation: Industrialist
- Spouse: Kristina Bergenstråhle (m. 1952; died 1989)
- Children: 3

Claes-Ulrik Winberg (23 September 1925 – 31 May 1989) was a Swedish industrialist and business executive. He was CEO of AB Bofors from 1972 to 1984. He was also chairman of the Swedish Iron Industry Association (Swedish: Järnbruksförbundet) from 1978 to 1983 and of the Swedish Employers Association from 1984 to 1985. Winberg was forced to resign his position as chairman of the Swedish Employers Association in 1984, following the unveiling of the Bofors scandal.

== Early life ==
Winberg was born on 23 September 1925 in Copenhagen, Denmark, the son of Major Karl Winberg and his wife Nellie (née Møller). He passed studentexamen in Jönköping in 1944 and studied at the Royal Swedish Naval Academy in the end of the 1940s and graduated from Technical University of Denmark with a Master of Engineering degree in 1952.

== Career ==
Winberg worked as an engineer at Husqvarna vapenfabrik AB from 1952 to 1953 and at Sundstrand Machine Tool Company in Rockford, Illinois, United States from 1953 to 1955. He then worked for the same company in Paris from 1955 to 1957. Winberg was export manager at A/S Atlas in Copenhagen, from 1957 to 1960 and CEO of A/S Sören Wistoft & Co Fabriker in Copenhagen from 1960 to 1962. Winberg worked as assistant to the managing director at AB Svenska Fläktfabriken from 1962 to 1966 and was CEO of Hexagon AB from 1966 to 1971. He was appointed vice CEO of AB Bofors in 1971 and was CEO of AB Bofors from 1972 to 1984. He was also chairman of the board of the Swedish Employers Association from 1984.

Winberg was in the late 1960s a board member of Svenska plåtrör AB, Hexagon AB, Gustav Carlsson & Co. He was also a board deputy of Vegete Group as well as board member of Copenhagen Junior Chamber of Commerce from 1959 to 1962 and the machine engineering group in the Danish Engineering Association (Dansk Ingeniørforening) from 1962. Winberg was later on also a board member of Vegete from 1966 (chairman from 1981), Swedish Iron Industry Association (Järnbruksförbundet) from 1973 (chairman 1978-83), Federation of Swedish Industries (Sveriges Industriförbund) from 1973, Gusums bruk AB from 1974, Sveriges Mekanförbund from 1974, Örebro County and Västmanland County chamber of commerce from 1974 (chairman 1977-83) and of Hasselfors AB from 1977. Winberg was also a board member of Boliden AB from 1979, the National Swedish Board of Economic Defence from 1978 and of the Swedish steel producers' association Jernkontoret from 1973. Winberg was a member of the Royal Patriotic Society from 1978.

== Bofors ==
Winberg was CEO of Bofors during a period characterized by unprofitability and structural problems within the company's civilian sector. The company was entirely dependent of the manufacturing of war materials, which occurred during a time when the company's deliveries to the Swedish military decreased due to shrunken government subsidies to the military. Winberg's line was to focus even harder on the war materials manufacturing. He advocated a weapons export policy without any restrictions whatsoever and periodically pursued an intensive lobby campaign towards Swedish defence politicians. It was during Winberg's leadership that Bofors become involved in Singapore, a strategic effort to increase weapons export in the entire Southeast Asia. In May 1984 Winberg was reported to the police by the Swedish Peace and Arbitration Society (SPAS) on charges of smuggling, for the alleged sale of RBS 70 to the illicit countries Dubai and Bahrain through Singapore. This started a series of revelations of what would later be known as the Bofors scandal. When Bofors during the turn of the year 1984/1985 merged with the company Kema Nobel into the new company Nobel Industrier, Winberg left his position as CEO but continued as a member of board of the new company. In June 1985, after the suspicions of crime against Bofors strengthened, Winberg resigned from his position as chairman of the Swedish Employers Association. In the summer of 1988 Winberg, together with three other former Bofors executives, was prosecuted by the Stockholm District Court for his role in the smuggling scandal. During the entire police investigation, Winberg strongly dismissed any participation in letting the weapon deliveries reach the unallowed countries Dubain and Bahrain. The court proceedings, where Winberg due to his sudden and unexpected death (see below) didn't participate, began on 4 September 1989. In December the same year, the three other former Bofors executives – Martin Ardbo, Lennart Pålsson and Hans Ekblom – where convicted by the court and given a conditional sentence for the illicit smuggling of goods. Furthermore, the company Nobel Industrier was ordered by the court to pay SEK 11 million in fines.

== Personal life ==
In 1952 he married Kristina Bergenstråhle (born 1929), the daughter of Gunnar Bergenstråhle and Ebba (née de Besche). He was the father of Ulrik (born 1955), Flemming (born 1958), and Christer (born 1960).

== Death ==
Winberg died in a car crash on road 53 between Västerås and Eskilstuna on 31 May 1989. Winberg was, together with his wife Kristina who also died in the crash, on his way to a dinner with friends in Stockholm. According to the police report, the car they were driving skidded on a wet roadway and collided with an oncoming van.

== See also ==
- Carl-Fredrik Algernon
- Cats Falck
