= Cats Falck =

Swedish television journalist

- Born: Maureen Cathryn Harriet Falck; 11 July 1953; Enskede, Stockholm, Sweden
- Died: Uncertain; disappeared on 18 November 1984, body found on 29 May 1985 at Norra Hammarbyhamnen, Stockholm, Sweden
- Occupation: Journalist
- Employer: Sveriges Television
- Partner: Lasse Strömstedt

Maureen Cathryn Harriet "Cats" Falck (11 July 1953 – date of death uncertain, between November 1984 and May 1985) was a Swedish television journalist who, together with her friend Lena Gräns, disappeared in Stockholm in 1984 while she was investigating a scandal involving the smuggling of weapons from Sweden to communist states in Eastern Europe. The dead bodies of Falck and Gräns were later found at the bottom of the Hammarby Canal in Stockholm. The deaths remain unsolved but later reports claim that they were assassinated in a state-sponsored operation by agents from East Germany.

Cats Falck was born in Enskede in Stockholm, Sweden.

At the time of her disappearance, Falck was employed as a reporter for the Swedish public service television news program Rapport.

Prior to her disappearance, Falck had told her work-mates and her fiancé (the author Lasse Strömstedt) that she was about to reveal "something big". She also claimed that when the story broke, she would get Stora Journalistpriset, "The Swedish Grand Prize for Journalism". In retrospect, several fellow journalists have claimed it would be very strange for a journalist to not inform her superiors that she was onto something big. If she had informed them, she would have been given more time and resources to pursue the story.

== Disappearance ==
On 18 November 1984, Falck and her friend Lena Gräns were last observed by witnesses as they left the restaurant Öhrns Hörn ("Öhrn's Corner") at the crossing of Folkungagatan–Borgmästargatan at Södermalm in Stockholm. Gräns' brother worked at the restaurant, and the Falk met a colleague. Both claim that the women shared a bottle of wine at their dinner.

The two women left the restaurant at approximately 21.30 CET.

Falck and Gräns had planned to spend a night out with a friend of Gräns, named Ulla Jones (married Andersson). However Jones fell asleep and didn't wake up until approximately 10 PM. She immediately went to Cafe Opera and waited all night, but Falck and Gräns never arrived.

== Search for the women ==
The disappearance sparked a great deal of interest from fellow journalists as well as the public. However, despite media coverage and countless tips from the public, both in Sweden and abroad, the police had no viable leads. After having left the restaurant, the women had seemingly evaporated.

The police did find that Gräns's car, a white Renault, was missing. This led the police to think that the women might have left of their own accord, or that they had been in a car accident and ended up in the waters in Stockholm. Another theory was that the women had met with foul play and that they, along with the car, had been dumped in the water. Because of this the police conducted extensive searches of the waters in the area.

On 29 May 1985, their bodies were found in the missing car on the bottom of the Hammarby Canal at Norra Hammarbyhamnen in southern Stockholm. The car was discovered by military divers during an exercise. The area had been searched at least six times by police divers.

The women were found wearing the same clothes as when they vanished. Despite its being Gräns's car, Falck was sitting in the driver's seat. Both women had their seatbelts still buckled.

== Police investigations ==
There have been two police investigations into the deaths of the women.

=== Initial investigation ===
The Swedish police, who had been working on several hypothetical theories, closed the case as an "accident". The initial investigation has been criticized because very few technical investigations were carried out, and several things that were never investigated.

Because Falck had just recently taken her driver's license, the police concluded that Falck had been practicing her driving with Gräns. They theorized that the women had driven too fast down a slope and lost control of the car which hit a 15 cm high rail for a harbor crane and flipped into the water. The women had subsequently drowned.

The autopsy revealed that Gräns had a broken nose but Falck had no broken bones or head injuries. It was noted that the women had pink water in their lungs but the water was never tested, and no reason was given as to the color.

Color scrapings were found on the car but either no analysis was carried out, or the results of the analysis were never noted down.

A piece of jewelry was found in the gravel at the harbour. Gräns's mother reported that a piece of jewelry was missing from her personal effects. It was never investigated if it was the same piece of jewelry.

The theory of how the car ended up where it was in the water has also been debunked. If the car hit the rail and flipped into the water the way the police suggests, it would have to move some 550 m while on the bottom. According to harbour employees, the water in the area has no currents, which is why the harbour is placed there. The bottom is muddy and the car, which had broken windows, would have sunk into it.

The legal limit for driving in Sweden is and was a blood alcohol content of 0.2 pro mille. After half a bottle of wine the women were likely over the limit.

Both Falck and Gräns were wearing high heels. It is somewhat illegal to drive in high heels in Sweden; although there is no explicit law, a driver in high heels may be charged with a reckless driving offence.

=== Second investigation ===
In 1997, new information that Falck was murdered because she had come across information about illegal arms deals led to the police re-opening the case. Despite new interviews investigating some of the leads that were missed in the first investigation, the police again arrived at the conclusion that the death was an accident.

== Murder theories ==
At the time of her disappearance, Falck, who was employed as a reporter for the Swedish public service television news programme Rapport, was investigating a major scandal comprising the Swedish company ASEA and smuggling of weapons to communist states in Eastern Europe. Another theory has been that Falck had information about the Swedish armaments company Bofors and that they sold weapons to countries with embargoes through intermediaries.

On the 8th anniversary of the disappearance, Ulla Jones came in contact with someone who claimed to know a Säpo (Swedish Security Service) employee with information about the death. The man claimed that the women had been drowned prior to being put in the water, possibly using a hose.

=== ASEA electronics smuggling ===
During the early 1980s, the Swedish company ASEA was selling American computers and software to the Soviet Union. It is known that Falck was investigating the case, but many people doubt that she had come across any sensitive information. According to the journalist Bo G Andersson, who has also written several of the articles used as sources in this article, Falck's work notes do not indicate that she had any unique information. Andersson has personally investigated the ASEA story and he has found no indications that Falck had any unique sources, or any information beyond what had already been publicised in other news.

Andersson also claims that the police officer who led the initial investigation into the case, Eric Skoglund, had told him that if Falck and Gräns were murdered, it was not because of the smuggling by ASEA, but rather because of information retaining to the gunpowder smuggling by Bofors. It is not known why Skoglund thought this was the case.

=== Bofors gunpowder smuggling ===
The Swedish armaments company Bofors was involved in the smuggling of gunpowder to Iran and Iraq during the 1980s. Bofors sold the gunpowder to East Germans, who then sold it forward. The person responsible for monitoring all Swedish arms deals with foreign powers was Swedish weapons inspector Carl-Fredrik Algernon.

In autumn 1984, Algernon contacted Christer Ekberg, one of the highest operatives at Säpo. According to Ekberg, Algernon told him that he had received information about Bofors's smuggling, but Algernon would not tell Ekberg where the information originated. The facts that Algernon provided were according to Ekberg written down into a PM, but if this is the case the PM has later gone missing.

In April 1997, the Swedish Security Service received an anonymous letter sent from Germany in which it was claimed that the former East German secret police Stasi had carried out the killings. In the letter, which was written in English, two retired Stasi officials and four other East German government officials were named, while the purported death squad was said to have consisted of three persons. The alleged motive behind the assassination was that Falck had received sensitive information about a secret weapons affair between the Swedish weapons manufacturer Bofors and East Germany. In the letter, Stasi was further blamed for the death of the Swedish weapons inspector Carl-Fredrik Algernon, the chief investigator of the Bofors scandal, in the Stockholm Metro in 1987. The letter claimed that it was Falck who had informed Algernon about weapons affair.

In June 1997 the Swedish newspaper Dagens Nyheter wrote a series of articles based on the new information from the letter, which prompted the Swedish police to take a new look at the case. The case also received much attention in German media and prompted the German Federal Police to open an investigation.

In September 2003, a 53-year-old German citizen, named as "Jürgen G" in a press release from the German Prosecutor-General, was arrested in Berlin suspected of having been a member of a group that carried out a number of assassinations on orders from the East German government from 1976 to 1987. According to an article in the German newspaper Berliner Zeitung, the suspicions against the man also involved the murder of Cats Falck and Lena Gräns. According to the article, the alleged death squad had operated directly under the East German government and not under Stasi as it was claimed in the earlier letter. The group had entered Sweden on false passports via West Germany and Denmark and then sought contact with Falck in Stockholm. There they had met up at the restaurant where Falck and Gräns were allegedly poisoned, placed in their car and then dumped into the Hammarby Canal. On 15 December 2003 the man was released from custody due to lack of evidence. The German investigation was closed in 2006.

=== Other theories ===
An investigation made by reporter Christoph Andersson on behalf of Sveriges Radio, the Swedish public service radio broadcasting service, found that Falck had been investigating the export of isostatic presses, which can be used in the manufacture of nuclear weapons, to Eastern Germany and the Stasi-controlled enterprise AHB Elektronik Import Export.

== See also ==
- Carl-Fredrik Algernon
- Claes-Ulrik Winberg
