= Lage Thunberg =

Swedish Air Force officer

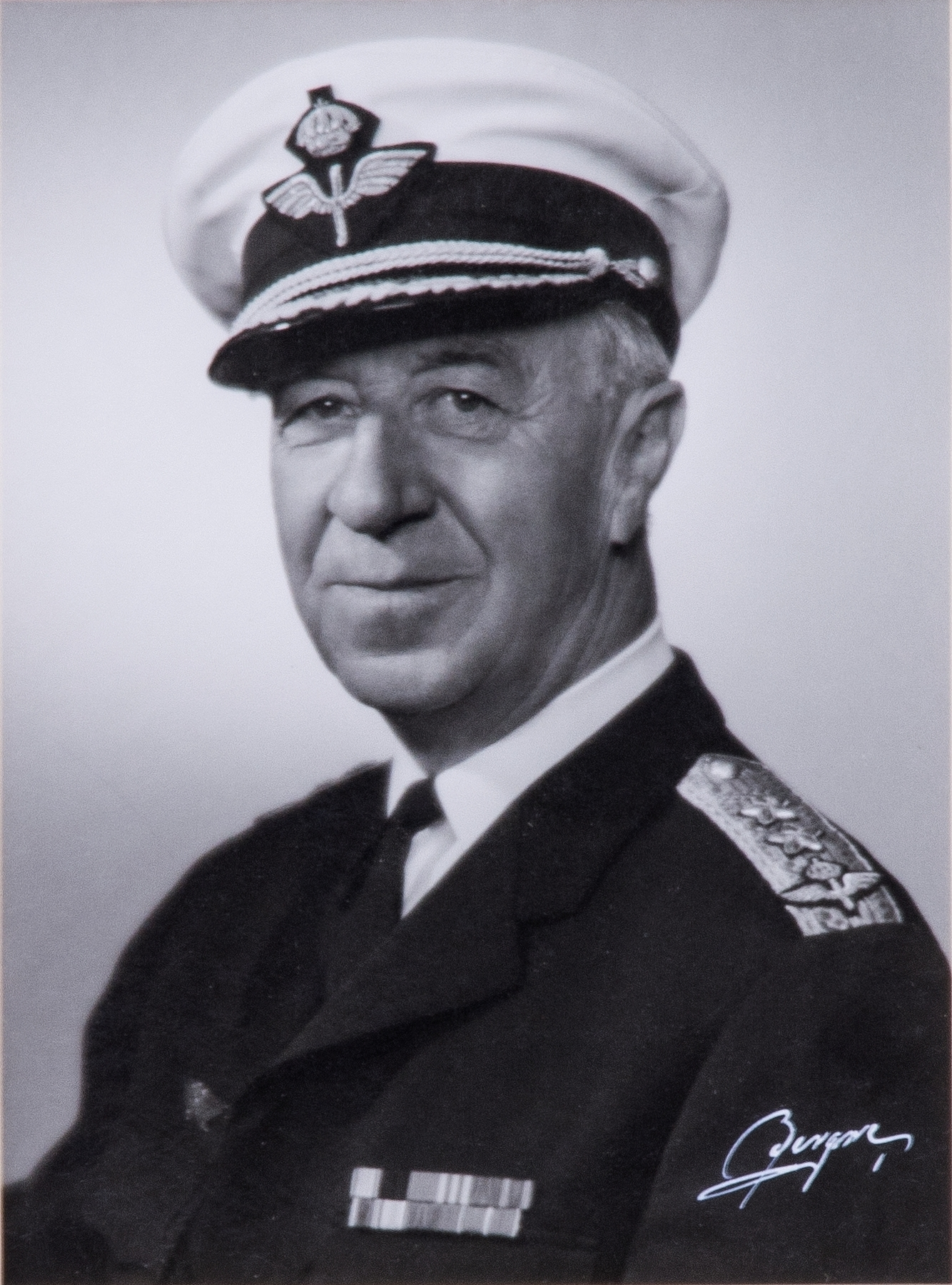
- Born: Lage Gustaf Harald Thunberg; 22 March 1905; Mörlunda, Sweden
- Died: 28 September 1997 (aged 92); Lidingö, Sweden
- Burial place: Galärvarvskyrkogården
- Military career
- Allegiance: Sweden
- Branch: Swedish Army (1927–33); Swedish Air Force (1933–68)
- Service years: 1927–1968
- Rank: General
- Commands: Royal Swedish Air Force College; Bråvalla Wing; Third Air Group; Chief of the Air Force
- Other work: War Materials Inspector

General Lage Gustaf Harald Thunberg (22 March 1905 – 28 September 1997) was a Swedish Air Force officer. He was the Chief of the Air Force from 1961 to 1968.

== Early life ==
Thunberg was born on 22 March 1905 in Mörlunda, Sweden, the son of master builder August Andersson and his wife Adéle (née Thunberg).

== Career ==
Thunberg was commissioned as an officer with the rank of second lieutenant and assigned to Kalmar Regiment (I 21) in 1927 and was transferred to the Swedish Air Force in 1933. Thunberg won the Nordic flying competition Nordisk flygarpokal in 1934 and 1936. He was promoted to captain in 1937 and was head of the Royal Swedish Air Force College (Flygvapnets kadettskola) from 1939 to 1943. He was promoted to major in 1942 and to lieutenant colonel in 1944. Thunberg was commanding officer of the Bråvalla Wing (F 13) from 1944 to 1947 (acting in 1943) and was promoted to colonel in the Swedish Air Force the same year.

In 1947 he was transferred to the Royal Swedish Air Force Materiel Administration. There Thunberg was head of the Equipment Office from 1947 to 1949, of the Aircraft Office from 1949 to 1950, of the Materiel Department from 1950 to 1954 and of the Aircraft Department from 1954 to 1957. He was promoted to major general in 1957 and was then commanding officer of the Third Air Group (Tredje flygeskadern, E 3) from 1958 to 1960 and vice chief of the Royal Swedish Air Force Materiel Administration from 1960 to 1961. Thunberg was promoted to lieutenant general in 1961 and was appointed Chief of the Air Force. He retired from the military in 1968 and was promoted to full general. Thunberg then served as War Materials Inspector and head of the National Swedish War Materials Inspectorate from 1968 and 1977.

== Personal life ==
In 1935 he married Birgit Bergström (born 1905), the daughter of factory manager Edvin Bergström and Fanny (née Gihl). Thunberg died on 28 September 1977 and was buried at Galärvarvskyrkogården in Stockholm.

== Dates of rank ==
- 1926 – Second lieutenant
- 1929 – Lieutenant
- 1937 – Captain
- 1942 – Major
- 1944 – Lieutenant colonel
- 1947 – Colonel
- 1957 – Major general
- 1961 – Lieutenant general
- 1968 – General

== Awards and decorations ==
=== Swedish ===
- (Sweden) Commander Grand Cross of the Order of the Sword (6 June 1963)
- (Sweden) Knight of the Order of the Polar Star
- (Sweden) Knight of the Order of Vasa

=== Foreign ===
- (Italy) 1st Class / Knight Grand Cross of the Order of Merit of the Italian Republic (13 April 1966)
- (Norway) Grand Cross of the Order of St. Olav (1 July 1967)
- (Netherlands) Grand Officer of the Order of Orange-Nassau with Swords (18 May 1957)
- (United States) Legion of Merit (6 April 1962)

== Honours ==
- Member of the Royal Swedish Academy of War Sciences (1954)
- President of the Royal Swedish Academy of War Sciences (1965–1967)

Military offices
Preceded by Torsten Rapp	Third Air Group; 1958–1960	Succeeded by Lennart Peyron
Preceded by Torsten Rapp	Vice chief of the Royal Swedish Air Force Materiel Administration; 1960–1961	Succeeded by Greger Falk
Preceded by Torsten Rapp	Chief of the Air Force; 1961–1968	Succeeded by Claës-Henrik Nordenskiöld
Government offices
Preceded by Bo Gejrot	War Materials Inspector; 1968–1977	Succeeded by Bengt Rosenius
Professional and academic associations
Preceded by Bert Carpelan	President of the Royal Swedish Academy of War Sciences; 1965–1967	Succeeded by Åke Lindemalm
