= Carl-Fredrik Algernon =

Swedish Navy officer

- Born: Carl-Fredrik Robert Algernon; 9 October 1925; Stockholm, Sweden
- Died: 15 January 1987 (aged 61); Stockholm, Sweden
- Burial place: Norra begravningsplatsen
- Military career
- Allegiance: Sweden
- Branch: Swedish Navy
- Service years: 1947–1974
- Rank: Rear Admiral
- Commands: 1st Destroyer Flotilla; Vice Chief, Eastern Military District; Section 2, Defence Staff; Military Office of the Minister of Defence
- Other work: War Materials Inspector

Rear Admiral Carl-Fredrik Robert Algernon (9 October 1925 – 15 January 1987) was a Swedish Navy officer. Algernon served as War Materials Inspector and head of the National Swedish War Materials Inspectorate from 1981 to 1987.

== Early life ==
Algernon was born on 9 October 1925 in Stockholm, Sweden, the son of head of department Carl Algernon and his wife Dagmar (née Alderin).

== Career ==
Algernon was accepted as a naval officer candidate in June 1944 and was commissioned as a naval officer and appointed acting sub-lieutenant in the Swedish Navy in September 1947. Algernon served afloat on various types of ships in the Swedish Navy during 1947–1955, 1958–1964, 1968–1969 and 1971–1972. He was promoted to sub-lieutenant in 1949 and did flight interaction training from 1955 to 1956 and completed the staff course at the Royal Swedish Naval Staff College from 1956 to 1957. Algernon was promoted to lieutenant in 1959 and was a member of the 1961 Defence Commission. Algernon became one of the few who in the Coastal Fleet was allowed to serve as ship commander and division commander at both motor torpedo boat units and torpedo boat units. From 1962 to 1964 he served as tactical adjutant in Flaggen, the staff of the Commander-in-Chief of the Coastal Fleet, when the new tactical regulations for the navy were to be put into practice. From 1964 to 1967, Algernon served as a teacher of tactics at the Swedish Armed Forces Staff College and regionally in Gothenburg and in Karlskrona. During this time, he was promoted to lieutenant commander in 1965 and to commander in 1966.

Algernon was a member of the Navy Officer Investigation (Marinbefälsutredningen) from 1969 to 1971 when he was promoted to captain. Algernon was commanding officer of the 1st Destroyer Flotilla (Första jagarflottiljen, 1. jaflj) from 1971 to 1972 when he was promoted to senior captain. He was vice chief at the staff of the Eastern Military District (Milo Ö) from 1972 to 1974 and chief of Section 2, the intelligence section, in the Defence Staff from 1974 to 1978 when he was promoted to rear admiral on 1 October. He was head of the Military Office of the Minister of Defence from 1978 to 1979 and its subsequent agency, the Ministry of Defence's International Unit (Försvarsdepartementets internationella enhet, Fö/INT) from 1979 to 1981 when he was appointed War Materials Inspector and head of the National Swedish War Materials Inspectorate, a governmental agency tasked with supervising and revise exports of war materiel to foreign countries.

== Bofors scandal and death ==
At the so-called Bofors scandal in the mid-1980s, when the arms manufacturer Bofors was suspected of extensive smuggling of munitions to "illicit" countries around the Persian Gulf, Algernon was appointed investigator. As such, he was controversial. Among other things, the Swedish Peace and Arbitration Society criticized him and demanded his resignation. He was accused, among other things, of having too lightly approved Bofors' request for arms exports to mainly Singapore. Large parts of this exported munitions were suspected to have ended up in the illicit countries of the United Arab Emirates (more specifically the Emirate of Dubai) and Bahrain. Algernon is said to have been on good terms with Bofors' CEO Martin Ardbo.

Algernon died when he was hit by a train at the Stockholm Metro station T-Centralen on 15 January 1987. Earlier on the day he had a meeting with the CEO of Nobel Industrier (the new owners of Bofors), Anders Carlberg, about the allegations of smuggling against the company. During the conversation, Carlberg had told Algernon about an internal investigation which had confirmed that smuggling had existed. Algernon then ended up in a conflict of loyalty. Due to Algernon's position as a leading investigator of the Bofors scandal, it was speculated that he might have been assassinated (i.e. pushed down on the railway). The police also chose to initiate a criminal investigation when, among others, the train driver witnessed how Algernon fell backwards on the track. The subsequent investigation into his death, which ended on 11 March 1987, concluded that he had committed suicide.

There were theories that Algernon's death had something to do with the assassination of Olof Palme. Other theories claim that the Stasi assassinated Algernon. Former Minister of Trade and County Governor in the 1980s Björn Molin claims in his book Ingen väg tillbaka ("No way back", 2002) that Algernon was murdered because he knew too much.

The funeral service was held on 3 February 1987 in Skeppsholmen Church in Stockholm. Algernon was interred on 4 March 1987 at Norra begravningsplatsen in Stockholm.

== Personal life ==
In 1947 he married Margareta Erlandson (1925–2015), the daughter of construction engineer Harald Erlandson and Signe (née Hallgren). They had two sons, Göran and Stefan (1950–2012).

== Dates of rank ==
- 1947 – Acting sub-lieutenant
- 1949 – Sub-lieutenant
- 1959 – Lieutenant
- 1965 – Lieutenant commander
- 1966 – Commander
- 1971 – Captain
- 1972 – Senior captain
- 1 October 1978 – Rear admiral

== Awards and decorations ==
- (Sweden) Knight 1st Class of the Order of the Sword (1965)

== Honours ==
- Member of the Royal Swedish Society of Naval Sciences (1965)

== See also ==
- Cats Falck
- Claes-Ulrik Winberg

Military offices
Preceded by Gösta Lundström	Section 2, Defence Staff; 1974–1978	Succeeded by Bengt Wallroth
Preceded by Dag Arvas	Military Office of the Minister of Defence; 1978–1979	Succeeded by None
Government offices
Preceded by Sven Olof Olin	War Materials Inspector; 1981–1987	Succeeded by Sven Hirdman
