= Svea Air Corps =

Coordinates: 59.4125°N 17.8750°E

- Svea flygkår
- Active: 1938–1974
- Country: Sweden
- Allegiance: Swedish Armed Forces
- Branch: Swedish Air Force
- Type: Corps
- Part of: Third Air Group (1938–1963); IV. Milo (1963–1966); Milo Ö (1966–1974)
- Garrison/HQ: Barkarby

Insignia
- Roundel

Aircraft flown
- Bomber: B 4, B 5, B 6, B 17
- Fighter: J 6, J 7, J 8, J 9, J 21, J 22, J 26, J 28B/C, J 29, J 34
- Helicopter: Hkp 1, Hkp 3, Hkp 3B, Hkp 4A
- Reconnaissance: S 14
- Trainer: Sk 7, Sk 11, Sk 12, Sk 14, Sk 15, Sk 16, Sk 25, Sk 50, Sk 60,
- Transport: Tp 3, Tp 7, Tp 16, Tp 45, Tp 46, Tp 47, Tp 52, Tp 79, Tp 82, Tp 83, TP 85, Tp 87, Tp 88, Tp 91
- G 101, Se 102, Se 103, Se 104, P 1

Svea Air Corps (Swedish: Svea flygkår), also F 8 Barkarby, or simply F 8, is a former Swedish Air Force air corps wing with the main base located in Barkarby just north of the capital Stockholm on the east coast.

== History ==
The meadows in the area were used since 1913 for basic flying training. From 1919 until 1936 the airport was a permanent international airport until the commercial traffic was transferred to the newly built Stockholm-Bromma Airport with paved runways.

From 1926 until 1938 the airfield was also used for evaluation of new aircraft for the Swedish Air Force. Units from other wings were also stationed here for air defense of the capital Stockholm.

In 1936, the decision was made to set up a permanent fighter air wing. Three squadrons of J 8 were initially detached to the Västmanland Wing (F 1) but moved to Barkarby on October 1, 1938. The aircraft were rather quickly replaced in 1940 by J 9.

In 1945 after the end of the war, the squadrons were reequipped with J 22. Some of the aircraft were received from F 16 and F 9. A few J 21A-1 were also stationed here initially for trials and training.

In 1949 the squadrons were gradually converted to jets with the introduction of J 28B Vampire. They were in turn replaced in 1952 with J 29 Tunnan.

In 1957 the squadrons received the J 34 Hunter. They were kept until 1964 when the three squadrons were disbanded and the aircraft were transferred to other wings. The name was changed to Kungliga Svea Flygkår (Royal Svealand Air Corps).

In 1961 a decision was made to base the new high-altitude Rb 68 Bloodhound surface-to-air missile at F 8 and replace the fighters. F 8 Barkarby became the technical centre in Sweden for training officers and conscripts for using the new missiles.

F 8 remained an active military base until the decommissioning in 1974 when it was opened for general aviation.

The airfield is known today as Barkarby Airport (IATA: N/A, ICAO: ESKB) and was used until 2010 for general aviation for hobby flyers and enthusiasts with small planes. The area around F8 has been heavily developed in the beginning of the 21st century, with a big Outlet shoppingcenter, Ikea store and numerous other stores. In 2010 the airfield was closed down permanently. The municipality is now building office and living areas on the former airfield and surroundings.

== Barracks and training areas ==
The Hägerstalund Airfield at Barkarby, 20 km northwest of Stockholm, was built in 1918 by the Aviation Company (Flygkompaniet) and was used from 1926 by the Stabens flygavdelning. New construction for the wing took place from 1937 to 1944. The wing had an underground hangar and the runway, which was in an east-west direction, was 2,000 m long.

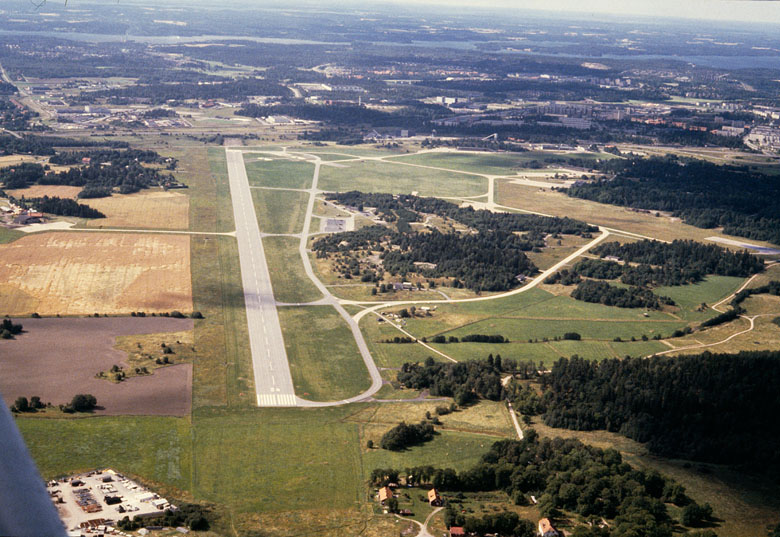
Aerial view in 1979

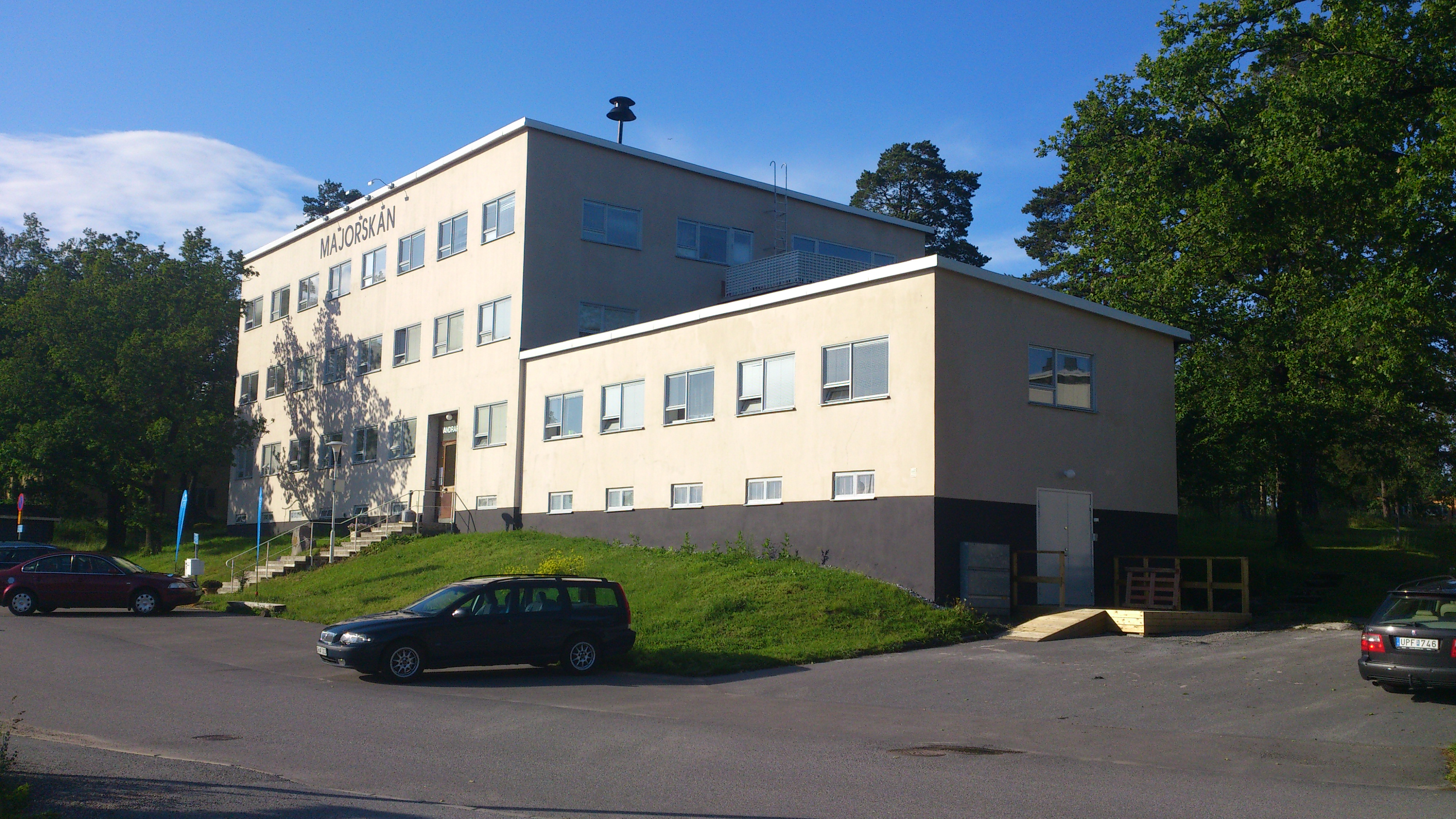
Chancellery building

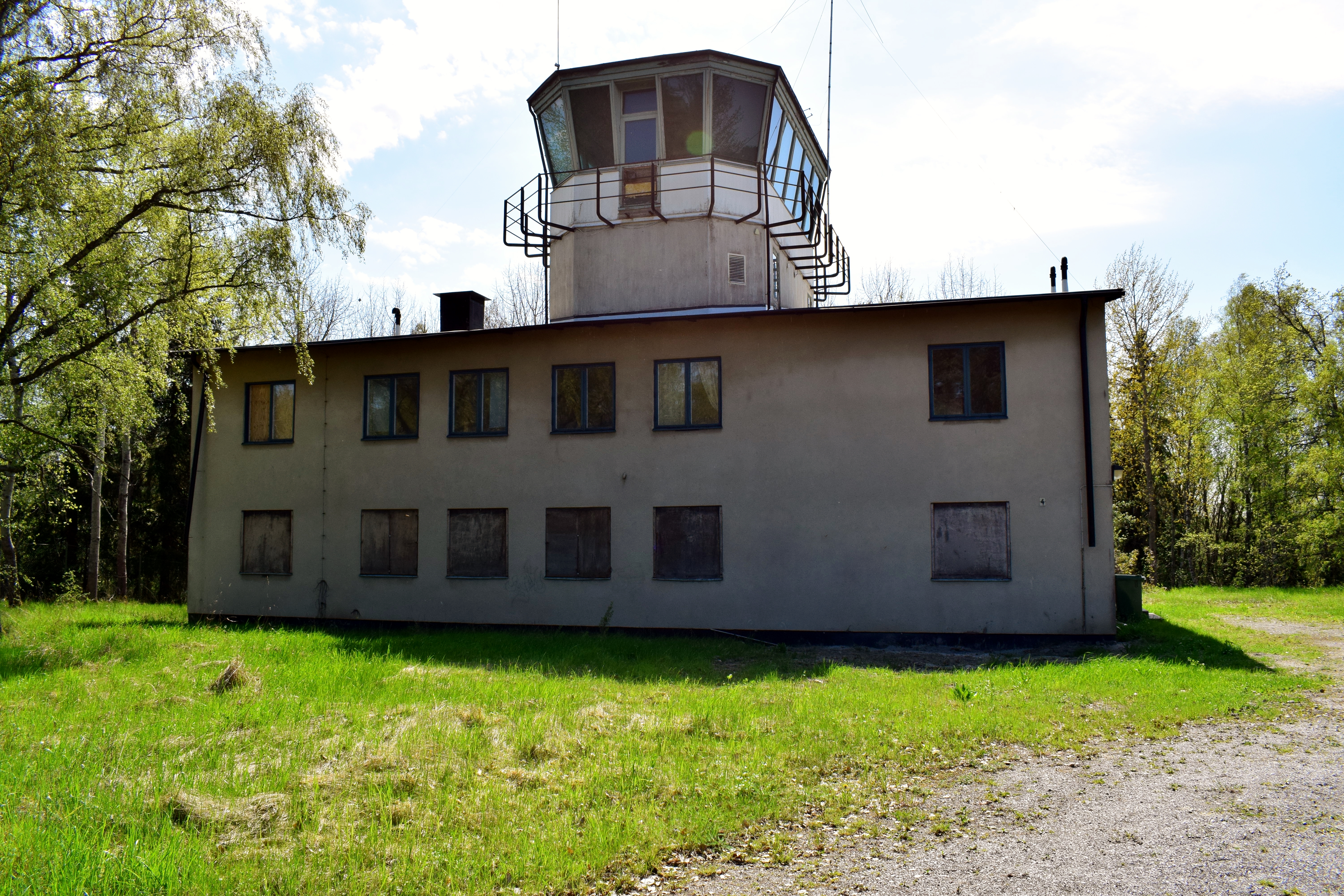
Control tower

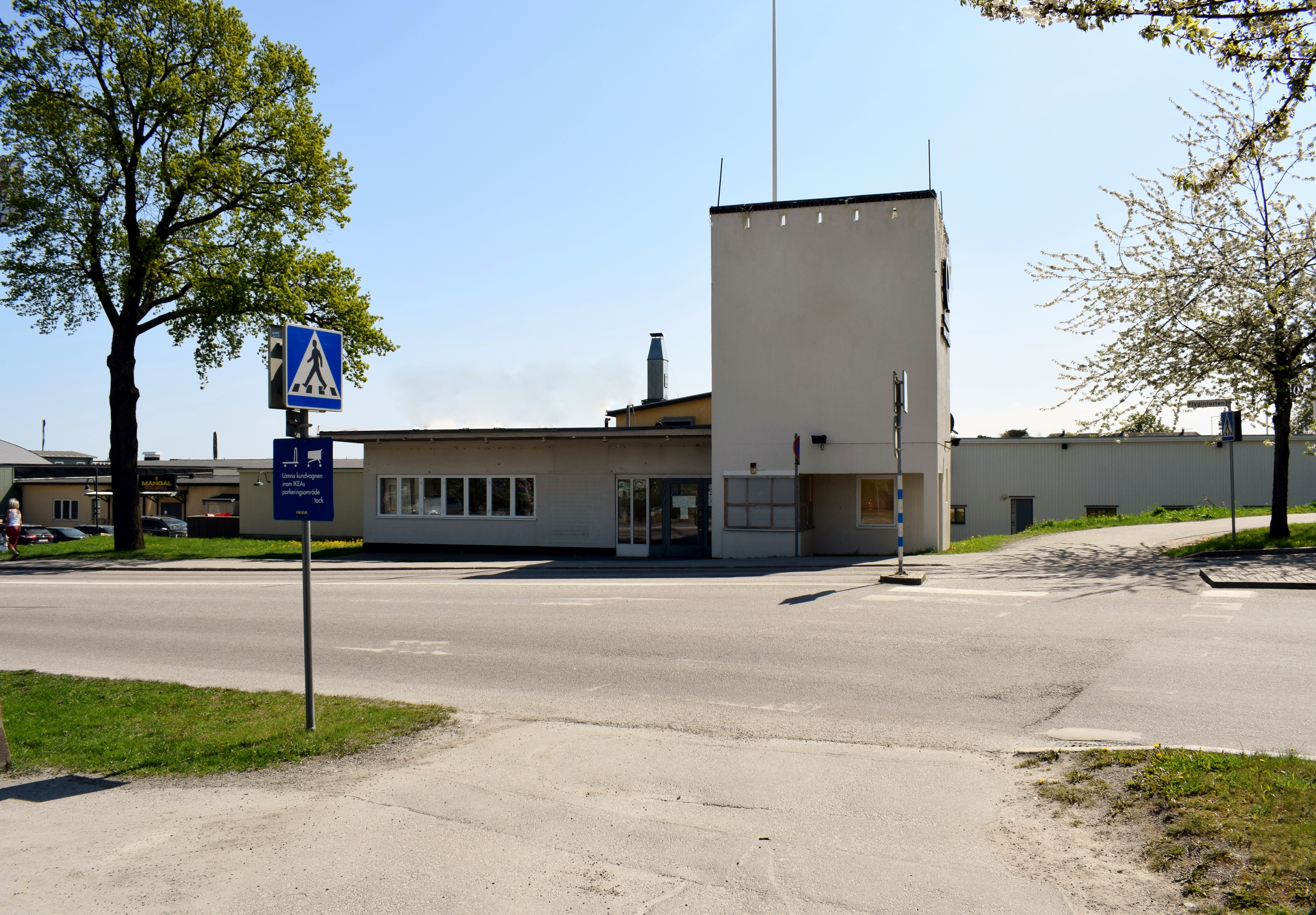
Guardhouse

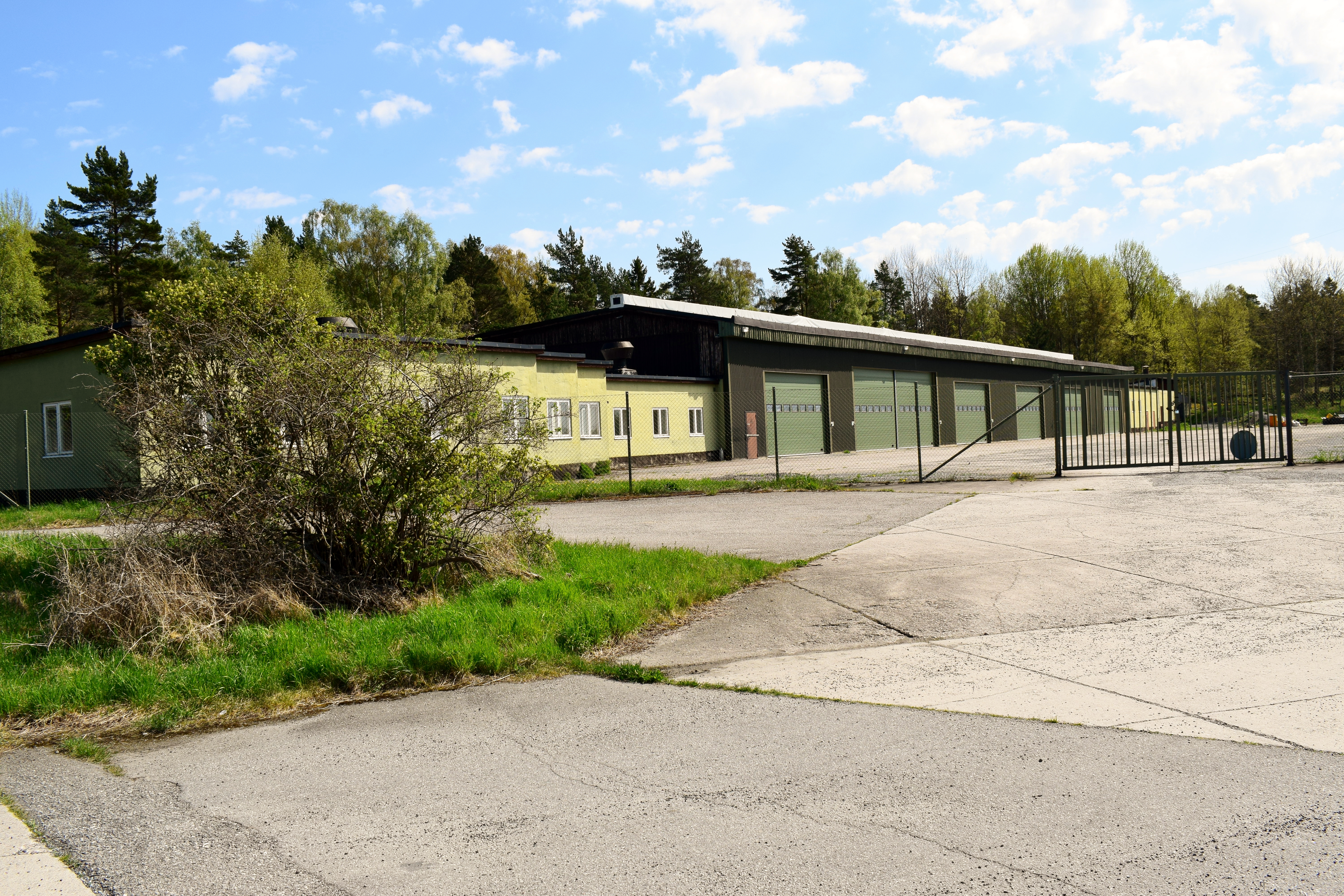
Hangar

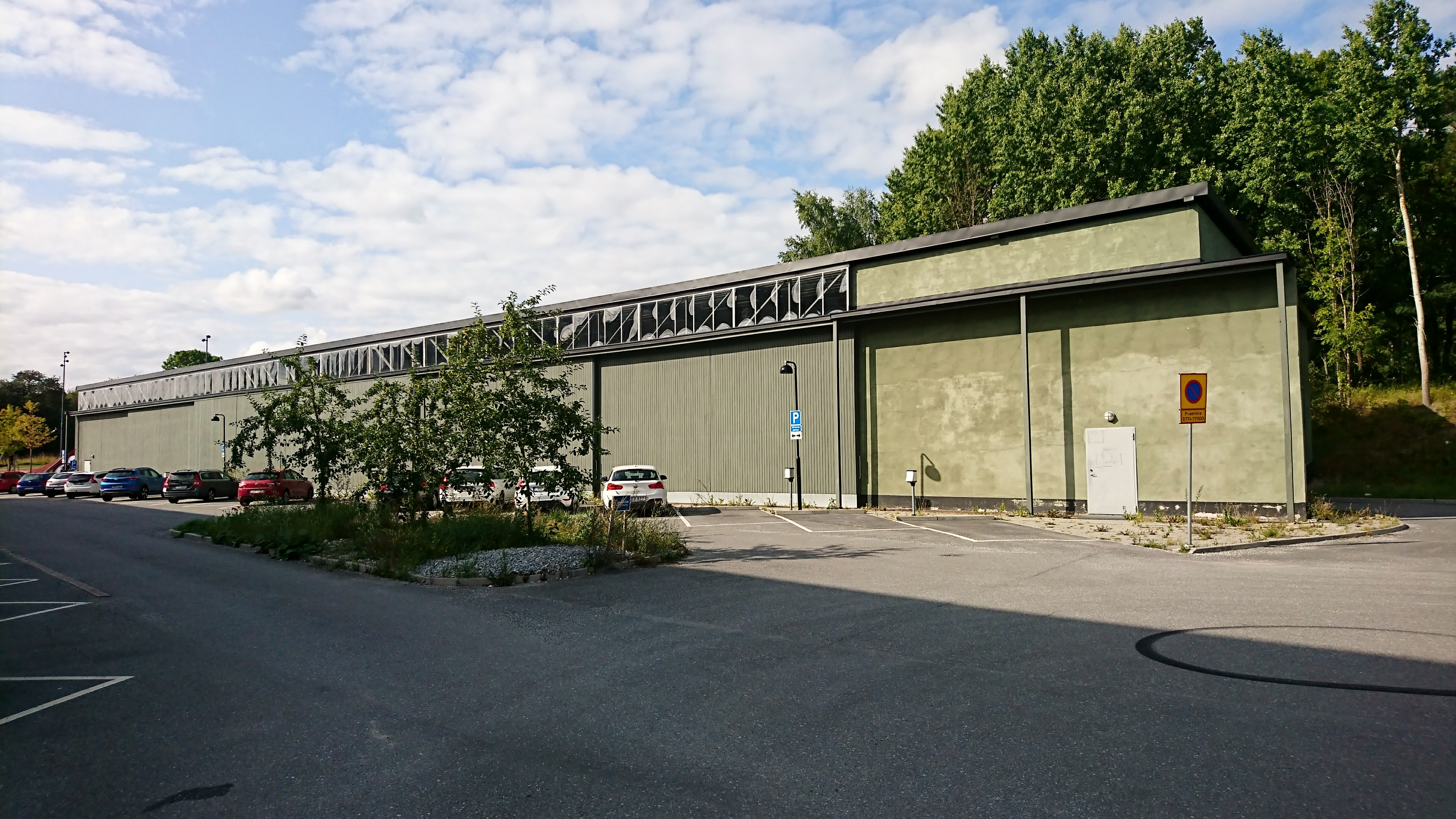
Hangar

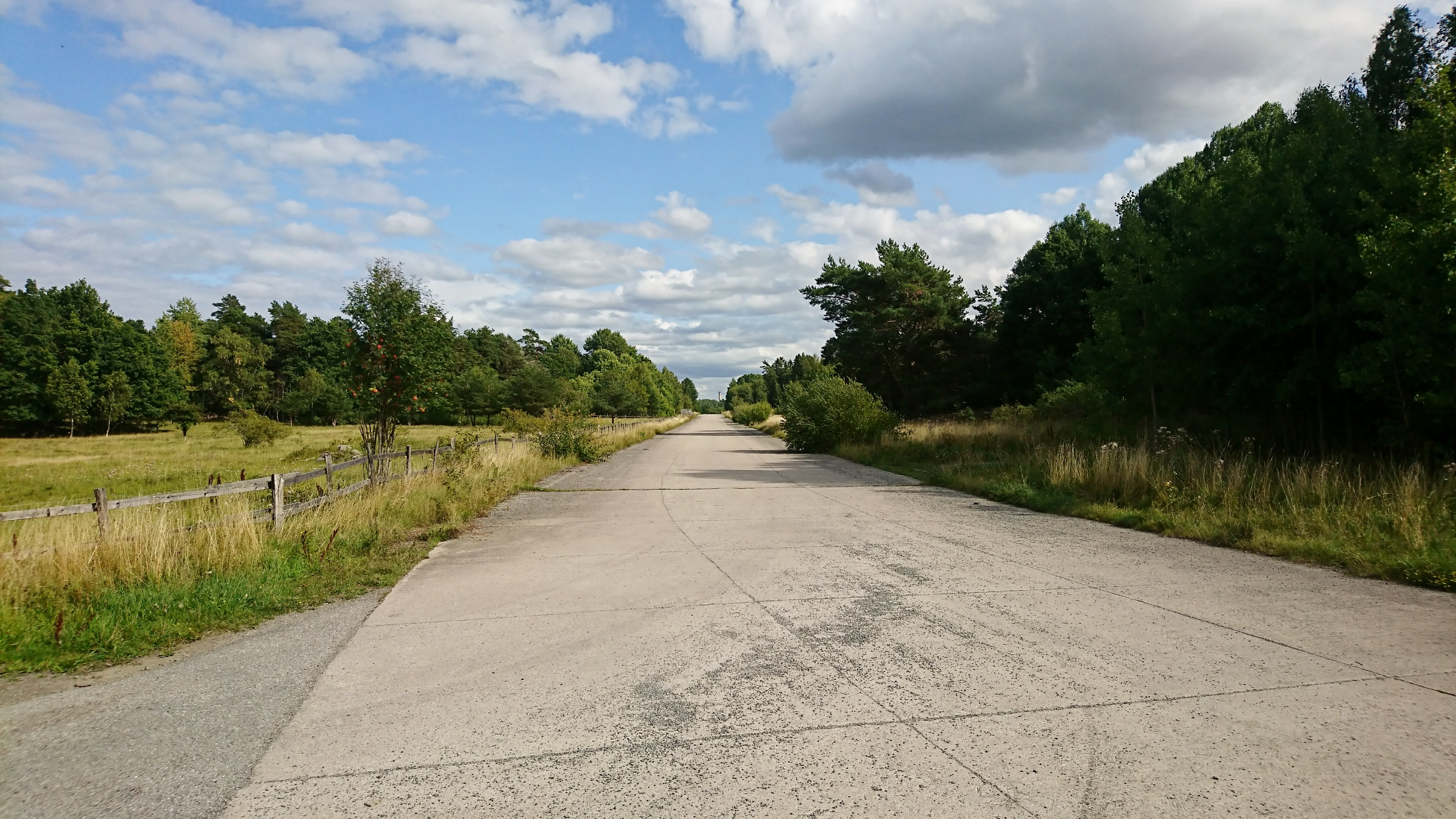
Runway

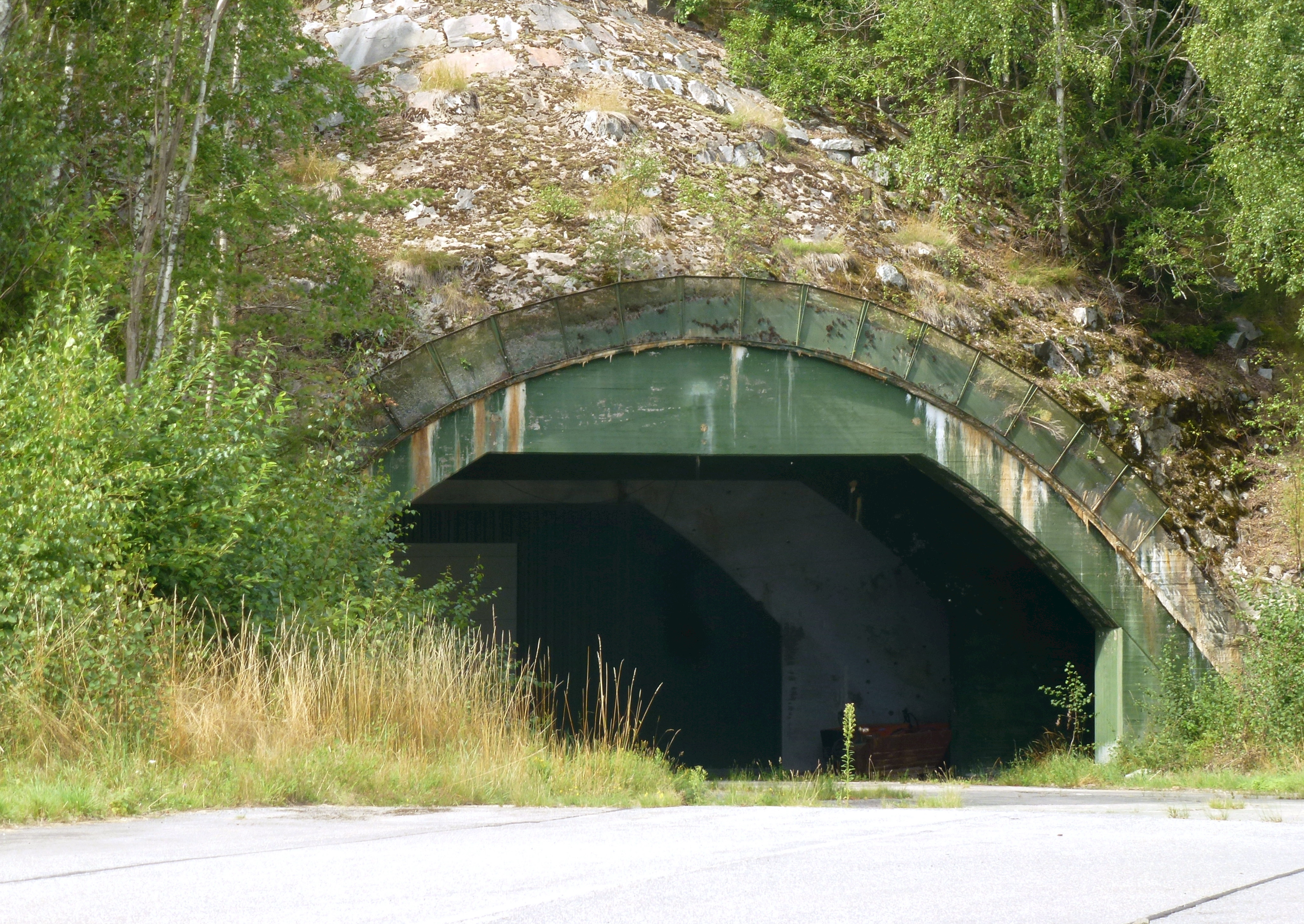
Underground hangar

== Heraldry and traditions ==
=== Coat of arms ===
Blazon: "Azure, powdered with open crowns and charged with the cost of arms of Stockholm, the crowned head of Saint Eric couped, all or".

=== Colours, standards and guidons ===
A colour was presented to the wing on 6 June 1939 at Barkarby by His Majesty the King Gustaf V. The colour was deposited on 1 July 1974 at Air Defence Sector O5 (F 1) for around 1990 being submitted to the Swedish Army Museum. Since 1999, it has been preserved at F 8's old officers' mess. Blazon: "On blue cloth in the centre the badge of the Air Force; a winged two-bladed propeller under a royal crown proper. In the first corner the crowned head of Saint Eric couped, all or".

== Commanding officers ==
Commanding officers from 1938 to 1974. The commanding officers was referred to as flottiljchef ("wing commander") and had the rank of colonel. From 1963 to 1974, the commander was referred to as kårchef ("corps commander") and had the rank of colonel.

- 1938–1941: Georg Gärdin
- 1941–1952: Lars Hägglöf
- 1952–1963: Sven Uggla
- 1963–1967: Nils-Fredrik Palmstierna
- 1967–1974: Stig Bruse

== Names, designations and locations ==
Name	Translation	From		To
Kungl. Stockholms flygflottilj	Royal Stockholm Wing	?	–	?
Kungl. Svea flygflottilj	Svea Wing; Svea Air Group	1938-07-01	–	1963-06-30
Svea flygkår	Svea Air Corps	1963-07-01	–	1974-06-30
Designation		From		To
F 8		1938-07-01	–	1964-??-??
F 8/Se O5		1965-??-??	–	1973-06-30
F 8		1973-07-01	–	1974-06-30
Location		From		To
Barkarby Airport		1938-07-01	–	1974-06-30

== See also ==
- List of military aircraft of Sweden
