= Ärna Air Base =

Ärna / Uppsala Air Base
- IATA: none; ICAO: ESCM

Summary
- Airport type: Military
- Location: Uppsala
- Elevation AMSL: 68 ft / 21 m
- Coordinates: 59°53′50″N 017°35′19″E
- Interactive map of Ärna / Uppsala Air Base

Runways
Direction	Length		Surface
Direction	ft	m	Surface
03/21	6,250	1,905	Asphalt
08/26	6,594	2,010	Asphalt

Ärna or Uppsala Air Base (ICAO: ESCM) is an air base located northwest of Uppsala, Sweden. It is a base of the Swedish Air Force. In 2009, it was announced that the Armed Forces had the intention to phase out its airport unit on 1 July 2010 and hand over the operation of the aerodrome to a private operator. However, on 19 December 2009, it was announced by the Supreme Commander that the Armed Forces will continue military air operations. This is because the alternative proposals to locate the flight operations were not feasible. Since 14 October 2021, Uppland Wing (F 16) is based at Ärna Air Base.

== Commercial flights ==
The company Uppsala Airport AB (formerly Uppsala Air AB), formed in 2004, applied to the government for permission to start commercial aviation at Ärna. The company claimed, based on calculations made in 2009 and 2010, that in five years' time the airport could serve up to 1.6 million passengers every year. The emphasis would primarily have been on low cost flights and charter flights.

On 18 April 2011, the Environmental Court (Miljödomstolen) ruled that commercial air traffic at Ärna would be likely to have a significant impact on the environment, and recommended the government to decline Uppsala Airport AB's application. In June 2018, the company released a statement saying that they would withdraw their petition to use Ärna for commercial aviation.

=== Criticism ===
Strong criticism has been expressed both from several environmental organizations and local residents against opening a commercial airport at Ärna. According to a poll among people from Uppsala municipality, conducted in June 2010 by an opinion research institute on behalf of Sveriges Radio, 40% of the 576 respondents were in favour of a commercial airport while 39% were against and 21% were undecided.

== See also ==
- List of the largest airports in the Nordic countries
