= Gusum =

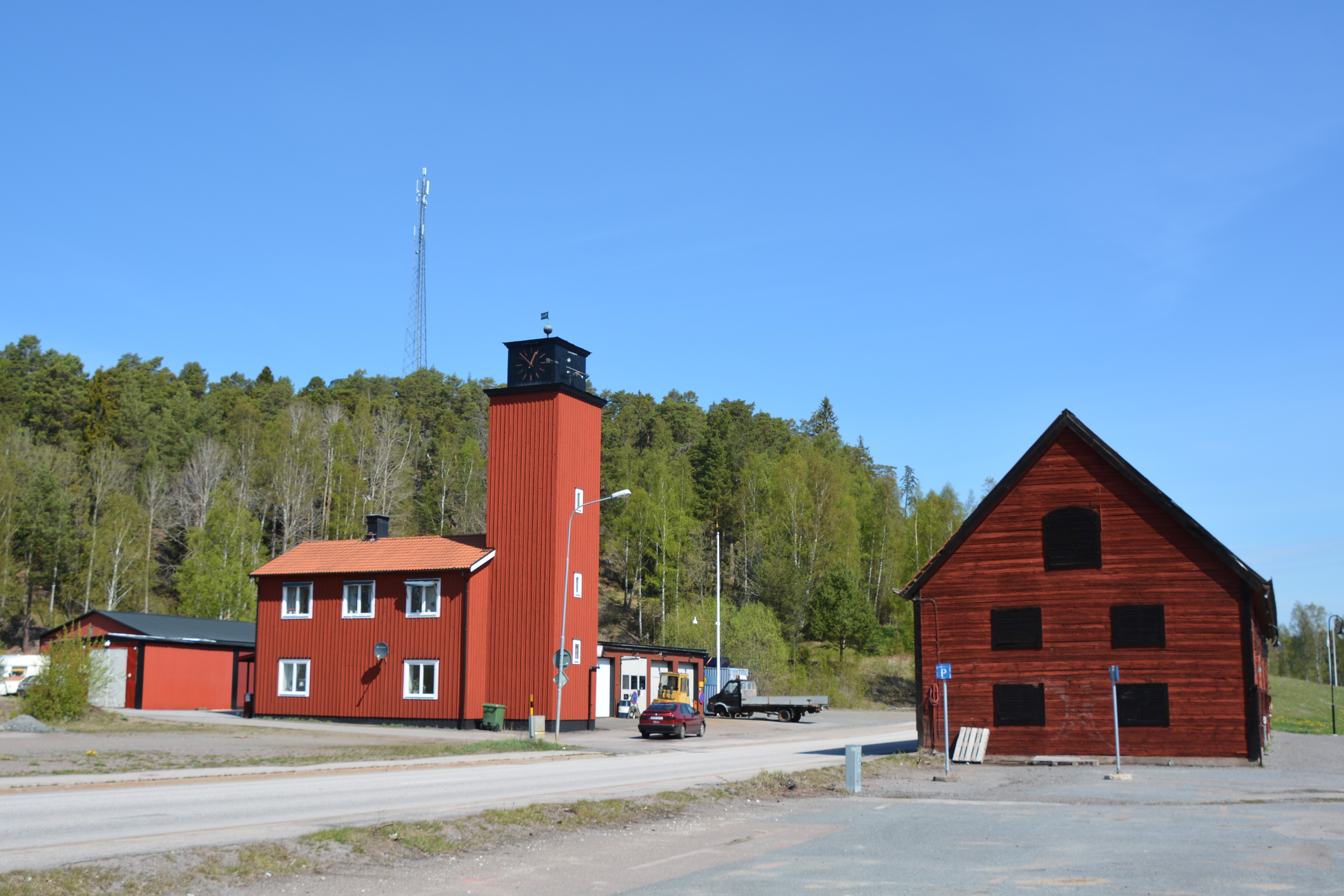

- Location within Östergötland Location within Sweden
- Coordinates: 58°16′N 16°29′E
- Country: Sweden
- Province: Östergötland
- County: Östergötland County
- Municipality: Valdemarsvik Municipality

Area
  - Total: 1.62 km^{2} (0.63 sq mi)

Population (31 December 2020)
  - Total: 1,110
  - Density: 685/km^{2} (1,770/sq mi)
- Time zone: UTC+1 (CET)
  - Summer (DST): UTC+2 (CEST)

Gusum is a locality situated in Valdemarsvik Municipality, Östergötland County, Sweden with 1,175 inhabitants in 2010. Gusum is the site of the now-defunct foundry Gusums Bruk.
