= Edmund Sparmann =

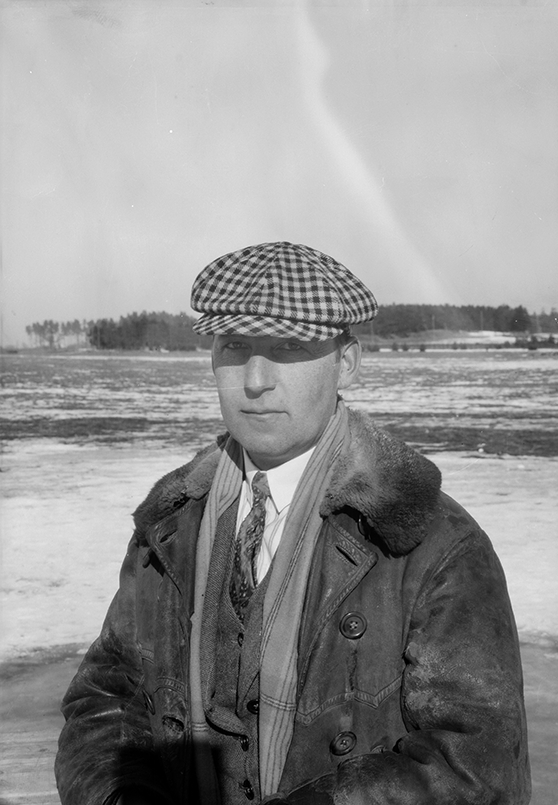
Edmund Sparmann (1928)

Edmund Ernst Karl Sparmann (16 June 1888 in Vienna, Austria – 24 June 1951 in Stockholm) was an aircraft designer and aeronautical inventor.

He created an aircraft factory in Stockholm, was an aircraft designer, created and patented several aeronautical inventions, served in the Austrian Army flying corps in the first world war and designed and built the P1 Sparmann airplane.

== P 1 Sparmann ==
The P 1, also known as the P 1 Sparmann or S 1-A ”Sparmannjagaren”, was a trainer fighter created by Sparmann.
