= Axel Gyllenkrok (sport shooter) =

Swedish sports shooter

Friherre Axel Gyllenkrok
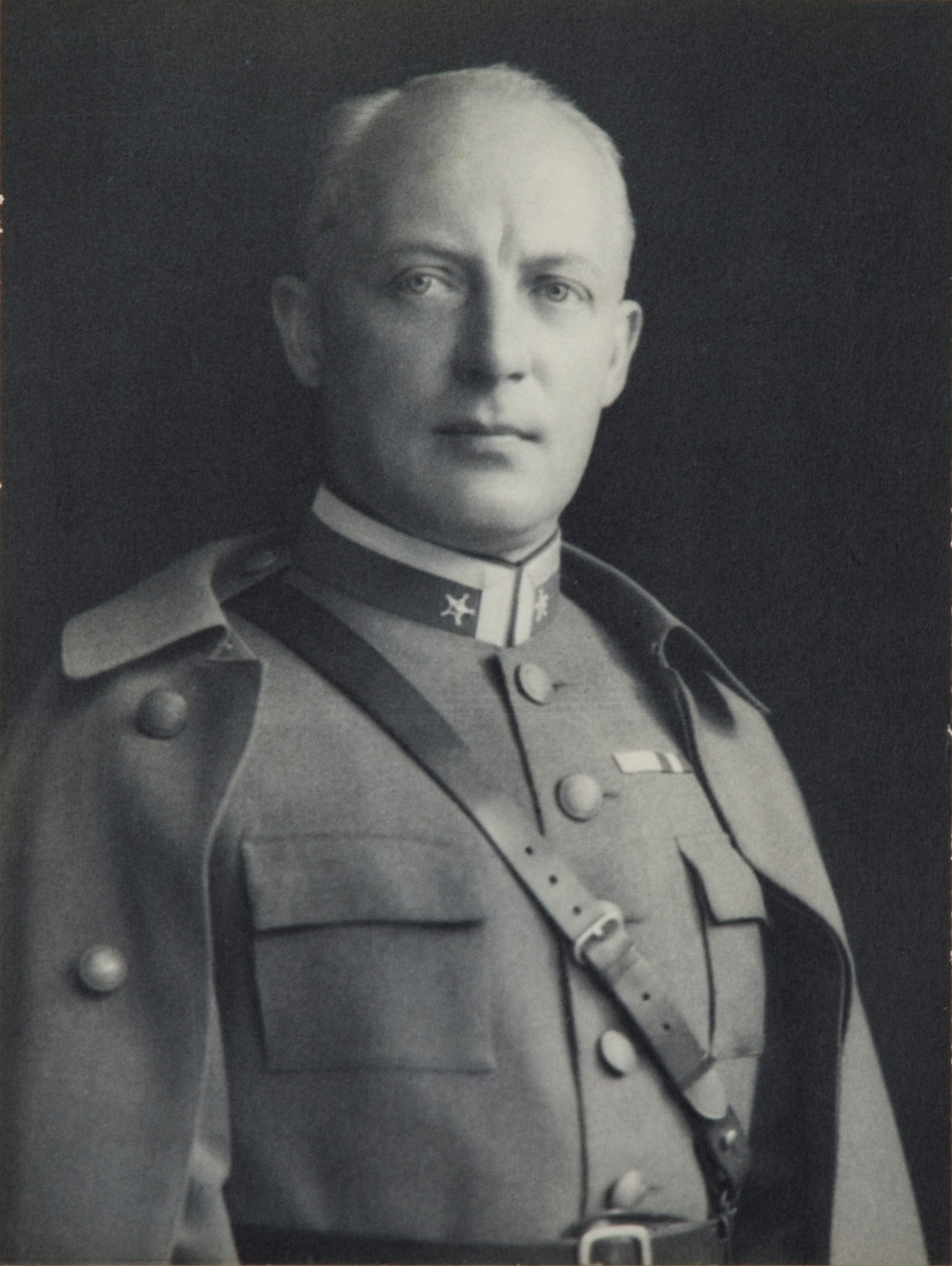
- Gyllenkrok as major (circa 1932-1934).
- Born: 9 August 1888; Karlskrona, Sweden
- Died: 7 August 1946 (aged 57); Stockholm, Sweden
- Military career
- Allegiance: Sweden
- Branch: Swedish Army; Swedish Air Force
- Service years: 1908–1938
- Rank: Colonel (Swedish Army); Major (Swedish Air Force)
- Commands: 3rd Flying Corps; Halland Regiment

Colonel Friherre Axel Walfrid Carl Gyllenkrok (9 August 1888 – 8 August 1946) was a Swedish officer and sports shooter. Gyllenkrok commanded the 3rd Flying Corps (1932–1934) and Halland Regiment (1937–1938).

== Early life ==
Gyllenkrok was born on 9 August 1888 in Karlskrona, the son of naval captain, Friherre Axel Thure Christian Gyllenkrok and his wife Elin Emma Ulrika Frick.

== Career ==
=== Military career ===
Gyllenkrok was commissioned as a underlöjtnant and was assigned to Svea Life Guards in 1908 and attended the Royal Swedish Army Staff College from 1913 to 1915 and was appointed captain of the General Staff in 1920 after aspirant service. He was an expert on the uniform committee and the committee for helmet experiments between 1920 and 1922. In the Swedish Air Force, Gyllenkrok was, among other things, head of the Air Force's first course for reserve officers in 1927 and the flight course for General Staff officers in 1928. He served in the Air Staff between 1927 and 1932 and was promoted to captain in the Air Force in 1928. Gyllenkrok served as a teacher at the Infantry Officer School (Infanteriofficersskolan, IOS) from 1928 to 1931, and he was an expert in the committee for arranging Sweden's defense against airstrikes between 1928 and 1930. Gyllenkrok was promoted to major in the Army in 1929 and served as a teacher at the Royal Swedish Army Staff College from 1929 to 1930. He became a member of the 1930 Defense Commission (1930 års försvarskommission) but received, upon request, dismissal from the 1934 appointment.

Gyllenkrok was promoted to major in the Air Force in 1932, and from 1932 to 1934, he was commander of the 3rd Flying Corps. He became a major in the Life Regiment Grenadiers in 1934. In the years 1934-1935, he served in the Italian Army. In 1936, he was promoted to lieutenant colonel, and from 1936 to 1937, he served as acting executive commander of the Life Regiment Grenadiers. He was appointed colonel in 1937 and was from 1937 to 1938 commander of Halland Regiment. His way of criticizing his officers with extremely harsh language led to his suspension in 1938. He transferred as colonel to the reserve and later had various commands and other military assignments and, among other things, since 1925 prepared various regulations and instructions for the army, navy, coastal artillery and air force.

Gyllenkrok was commanded to and made military study trips in England in 1930, in the Soviet Union in 1937, and in Germany etc. in 1941. He belonged to the circle of officers, who with Ny militär tidskrift ("New Military Journal") as a body, worked on a renewal of the Swedish defence after 1925 disarmament. He was one of the leading forces and most active collaborators in the creation of the book Antingen – eller ("Either – Or") (1930), together with, for example, Helge Jung. Gyllenkrok had in magazines, and a large number of newspapers as well as in special magazines with great perseverance defended his views on various defence issues, thereby usually adopting a strongly critical attitude to prevailing conditions. Among other things, he has published Exempel på ett reglemente för infanteriets stridsutbildning (together with Martin Hanngren, 1923), Arméns krigsberedskap (1938), Tysk krigföring (1940), Synpunkter rörande utbildning (1942), Partisankrig (1943), Partisankrig i snö, skog och berg (1945) as well as Utan uppdrag i Moskva (1945).

=== Sports career ===
Gyllenkrok has also been an active athlete and sport shooter and has done a lot of work for military sports. He competed in two events at the 1912 Summer Olympics.

== Personal life ==
Gyllenkrok was never married.

== Dates of rank ==
- 1908 – Underlöjtnant
- 1911 – Lieutenant
- 1920 – Captain (Army)
- 1928 – Captain (Air Force)
- 1929 – Major (Army)
- 1932 – Major (Air Force)
- 1936 – Lieutenant colonel
- 1937 – Colonel

== Honours ==
- Member of the Royal Swedish Academy of War Sciences (1943)
