= Bengt Rosenius =

Swedish Air Force officer (1918–1979)

Major General Bengt Rosenius
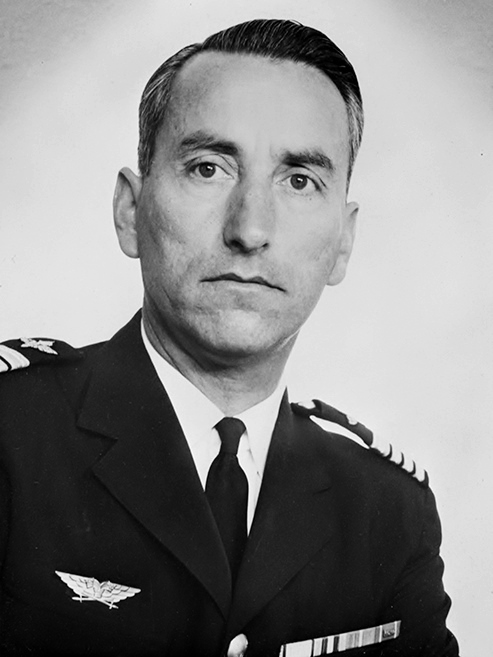
- Born: 30 November 1918; Stockholm, Sweden
- Died: 28 December 1979 (aged 61); Täby, Sweden
- Burial place: Norra begravningsplatsen
- Spouse: Ingela Hagner (m. 1944)
- Children: Marianne; Ulrika
- Military career
- Allegiance: Sweden
- Branch: Swedish Army; Swedish Air Force
- Service years: 1941–1977
- Rank: Major General
- Commands: Section III, Defence Staff; Östgöta Wing; Inspector of Flight Safety; Attack Command
- Conflicts: Congo Crisis
- Awards: Order of the Sword

Major General Bengt Rosenius (30 November 1918 – 28 December 1979) was a Swedish Air Force officer. Rosenius served as wing commander of the Östgöta Wing, Inspector of Flight Safety and Commanding General of the Attack Command. Later in his career he served two years as War Materials Inspector and head of the National Swedish War Materials Inspectorate.

== Early life ==
Rosenius was born on 30 November 1918 in Stockholm, Sweden, the son of Nils Rosenius, an accountant, and his wife Edith (née Horwitz). He passed studentexamen in 1938.

== Career ==
Rosenius was commissioned as an officer in the Swedish Air Force in 1941 with rank of second lieutenant. Rosenius was promoted to captain in 1948 and was the same year course director at the Royal Swedish Air Force College (Flygkadettskolan) in Uppsala. Rosenius then attended the staff course at the Royal Swedish Air Force Staff College from 1948 to 1949. He was promoted to major in 1954 and to lieutenant colonel in 1957, the same year he attended the Swedish National Defence College. Rosenius was head of the Air Staff's Education Department from 1956 to 1958 and of the Defence Staff's Section III (Press Department) from 1958 to 1961.

In 1961, Rosenius served as Senior Air Staff Officer in the United Nations (ONUC) Air Force in Congo during the Congo Crisis. In 1962, he was promoted to colonel and appointed wing commander of Östgöta Wing in Linköping. In 1965, Rosenius was appointed Inspector of Flight Safety (Inspektör för flygsäkerhetstjänsten). The same year he became a board member of the Civil Aviation Administration. Rosenius was promoted to major general in 1973 and was appointed Commanding General of the Attack Command. Rosenius retired from active service in 1977 and on 1 July he took up the position as War Materials Inspector and head of the National Swedish War Materials Inspectorate. Rosenius held the position until his death on 28 December 1979.

== Personal life ==
In 1944, Rosenius married Ingela Hagner (born 1921), the daughter of Gustav Hagner and Hertha Hagner. They had two children; Marianne (born 1945) and Ulrika (born 1957).

== Death ==
Rosenius died on 28 December 1979 and was buried at the Northern Crematorium at Norra begravningsplatsen in Stockholm.

== Dates of rank ==
- 1941 – Second lieutenant
- 1943 – Lieutenant
- 1948 – Captain
- 1954 – Major
- 1957 – Lieutenant colonel
- 1962 – Colonel
- 1973 – Major general

== Awards and decorations ==
- (Sweden) Commander 1st Class of the Order of the Sword (6 June 1969)
- (Sweden) Commander of the Order of the Sword (6 June 1966)

== Honours ==
- Member of the Royal Swedish Academy of War Sciences (1966)

== Filmography ==
- Första divisionen (1941) - air force officer at the farewell dinner

Military offices
Preceded by ?	Section III of the Defence Staff; 1958–1961	Succeeded by Claës Skoglund¹
Preceded by Åke Sundqvist	Östgöta Wing; 1962–1965	Succeeded by Olle Knutsson
Preceded by Christian Nilsson	Inspector of Flight Safety; 1965–1973	Succeeded by Björn Hedberg
Preceded by Gösta Odqvist	Attack Command; 1973–1977	Succeeded by Sven-Olof Olson
Government offices
Preceded by Lage Thunberg	War Materials Inspector; 1977–1979	Succeeded by Sven Norberg
Notes and references
1. After 1961, Section III was called Operationsledning III/3 (OpLIII/OpL3) - beredskap och övningar ("Operations Command III/3 (OpLIII/OpL3) - readiness and exercises")
