= National Swedish War Materials Inspectorate =

Defunct government agency

The National Swedish War Materials Inspectorate (Swedish: Krigsmaterielinspektionen, KMI), was a Swedish government agency established in 1935 and existing until 1 February 1996. It was merged with the strategic export control activities in the Swedish Government Offices and formed National Inspectorate of Strategic Products. KMI was not an independent agency but was originally included in the Ministry of Commerce and Industry and later in the Ministry for Foreign Affairs' Department of Trade.

== War Materials Inspector ==
The head of the National Swedish War Materials Inspectorate was called the War Materials Inspector (Swedish: Krigsmaterielinspektör) The following people have been War Materials Inspectors:

- 1935–1945: Colonel Karl Axel Bratt
- 1946–September 1960: Colonel Carl Hamnström
- October 1960–31 December 1964: Lieutenant General Carl Årmann
- 1 January 1965–4 April 1968: Lieutenant General Björn Bjuggren
- April 1968–June 1968: Administrative Officer Bo Gejrot (acting)
- 1 July 1968–30 June 1977: General Lage Thunberg
- 1 July 1977–29 December 1979: Major General Bengt Rosenius
- July 1979–28 February 1980: Director-General for Administrative and Legal Affairs Sven Norberg and Director Jörgen Holgersson (on short-term appointments)
- 1 March 1980–31 January 1981: Major General Sven Olof Olin
- 1 February 1981–15 January 1987: Rear Admiral Carl-Fredrik Algernon
- 16 January 1987–4 October 1987: Director-General for Administrative and Legal Affairs Jörgen Holgersson (acting)
- 1987–1994: Sven Hirdman
- 1995–1996 (2000): Staffan Sohlman
