= Gusums Bruk =

Swedish brass production foundry

Gusums Bruk was a foundry in Gusum, Sweden, specializing in brass production. The foundry commenced operations in 1653. Chandeliers and industrial products were its main products. Cannons, copper and brass wires, button pins, candlesticks, paper fabric for fabrication, safety needles, and zippers were also made. It filed for bankruptcy and shut down in 1988. It is no longer active, and its ruins have been demolished and the area decontaminated. A former subsidiary is still in operation at another site in Gusum.
