= FFVS J 22 =

1942 fighter aircraft family by FFVS

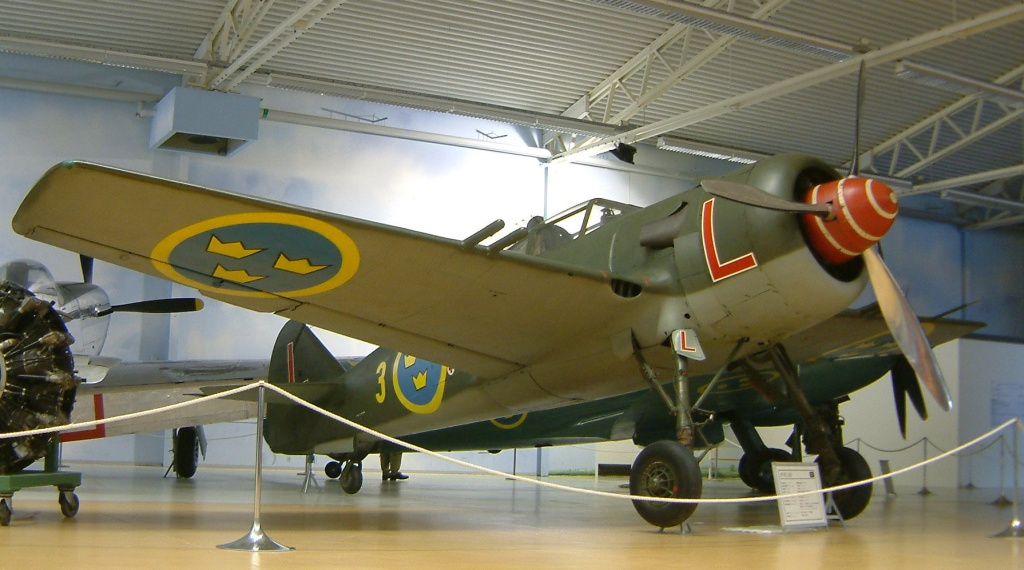
- An FFVS J 22 on static display at the Swedish Air Force Museum, in the markings of Östgöta Wing (F 3), code "L".

General information
- Type: Fighter
- National origin: Sweden
- Manufacturer: Kungliga Flygförvaltningens Flygverkstad i Stockholm (FFVS)
- Designer: Bo Lundberg
- Status: Retired
- Primary user: Swedish Air Force
- Number built: 198

History
- Manufactured: 1942–1946
- Introduction date: October 1943
- First flight: 20 September 1942
- Retired: 1952

The FFVS J 22 was a Swedish single-engine fighter aircraft developed for the Swedish Air Force during World War II.

== Development ==
At the onset of World War II, the Swedish Air Force (Flygvapnet) was equipped with largely obsolete Gloster Gladiator (J 8) biplane fighters. To augment this, Sweden ordered 120 Seversky P-35 (J 9) and 144 Vultee P-66 Vanguard (J 10) aircraft from the United States. In October 1940, the United States declared an embargo against delivering the remainder of the orders to Sweden (60 P-35s had been delivered). Flygvapnet suddenly faced a shortage of modern fighters. Several other foreign alternatives were considered: the Soviet Polikarpov I-16 and I153 were considered obsolete, the Finnish VL Myrsky was rejected due to its all-wooden construction and while Japan offered the Mitsubishi A6M, delivery from Japan was impractical. A batch of Fiat CR.42 Falco (J 11) biplanes and Reggiane Re.2000 Falco (J 20) were eventually purchased but this was clearly an interim solution.

It was decided to design a new fighter to meet Flygvapnet's needs. As Saab was running at full capacity building its single-engine Saab 17 and twin-engined Saab 18 bombers, a new organisation was set up to design and build the new aircraft, the Kungliga Flygförvaltningens Flygverkstad i Stockholm ("Royal Air Administration Aircraft Factory in Stockholm", FFVS). The design team would be led by Bo Lundberg.

This was one of the finest aircraft that I have ever flown. The responsiveness of the controls and overall handling was exceptionally nice. It was not a high altitude fighter but up to about 5000 m (16,000 ft) it could hold its own very well. We flew mock dog fights with P-51 Mustangs and they could not catch us below 4000 m (13,000 ft) but if the fight was higher than that we had to be very careful. At altitudes above 6000 m (19,500 ft) it was getting sluggish and at 9000 m (29,000 ft) it was not much power left. Stalls in turns and straight forward were usually not a problem. If you pulled really hard in turn it would sometime flip over on its back. The first version, the 22-A, did not have much fire power, but the 22-B was better.

—Ove Müller-Hansen (pilot),

The new aircraft, designated J 22, was a mid-wing cantilever monoplane with a retractable undercarriage and an enclosed cockpit. The narrow-track main landing gear retracted rearward entirely within the fuselage. To minimise the use of strategic materials, the aircraft was of mixed steel and wood construction, with a plywood-covered molybdenum steel tube fuselage covered by moulded plywood panels, and wings with welded steel spars and ribs covered by plywood. Power came from a Swedish copy of the Pratt & Whitney R-1830 Twin Wasp, manufactured by Svenska Flygmotor without a license at the time, although some sources state that after the end of the war, Svenska Flygmotor volunteered to pay a licence fee, with a symbolic US$1 eventually being agreed.

While the two prototypes would be built at the Flygtekniska försöksanstalten (National Aeronautical Research Institute), production aircraft would be assembled by a factory at Stockholm Bromma Airport which would be built by, and leased from the Swedish airline AB Aerotransport. Extensive use was made of sub-contractors, many of which (such as AGA, and Hägglund & Söner) were outside the aviation industry, to build sub assemblies of the J-22.

The first prototype J 22 made its maiden flight on 20 September 1942 from Bromma airport, with the second prototype flying on 11 June 1943. While both prototypes were destroyed in crashes, on 19 June and 20 August 1943 respectively, production had already been started prior to the prototypes flying. Deliveries of production J 22s, to the F9 air wing at Gothenburg, began in October 1943. While delivery of the 198 production aircraft was planned to be completed by 1 July 1946, strike action by factory workers disrupted these plans, and the final 18 J 22s were assembled by the Flygvapnet workshops at Arboga. The last J 22 was delivered on 6 April 1946.

== Operational history ==
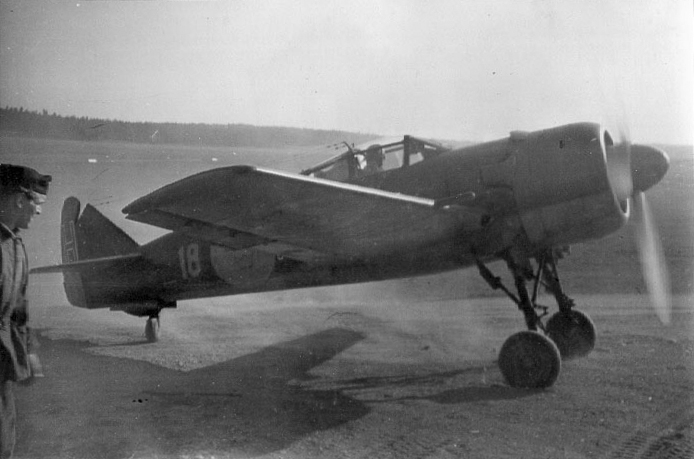
J 22 18 in 1948

The J 22 was well-liked by its pilots and possessed good manoeuvrability and responsive controls. Forward visibility on the ground left something to be desired and if the tailwheel was left unlocked and able to swivel during take-off there was the potential to ground-loop.

With 575 km/h (360 mph) from a 795 kW (1,065 hp) engine, the Swedish press called the diminutive fighter the "world's fastest in relation to the engine power". (While this was not absolutely accurate, the J 22 was in the same class as the early marks of Supermarine Spitfire and Mitsubishi A6M [Zero].) J 22 pilots tongue-in-cheek modified this to "the world's fastest in relation to track width", because of the very narrow spacing of the undercarriage.

In mock dogfights with P-51 Mustangs (called J 26 in Swedish service) it was able to "hold its own" up to 5,000 m (16,000 ft) although, above 6,000 m (20,000 ft), without a good high altitude supercharger, it became sluggish. Because of its simple systems the J 22 was also very easy to maintain and service. The J 22 was retired from service in 1952.

== Surviving aircraft ==
Five examples of the J 22 have been preserved.

Three examples are owned by the Swedish Air Force Museum, at Malmslätt, Östergötland, site of the former F 3 air wing.

22280 F 3 Red L is on static display at the museum itself.

22185 F 10 Red K is located at the Ängelholms Flygmuseum at the former F 10 air force wing outside Ängelholm, Skåne. This example is able to taxi under its own power.

22149 is owned by Svedinos Bil- Och Flygmuseum (Svedinos Automobile and Aviation Museum), in Ugglarp, Halland. This aircraft is currently undergoing restoration to flying condition in Sweden.

Two more J 22 incomplete airframes survive. 22216 is owned by the Swedish Air Force Museum with 22236 one being owned privately. They are planned to be combined with each other and restored to flying condition.

== Variants ==
J 22-1 or J 22A

Originally called J 22 UBv "Ursprunglig Beväpning" (original armament). First production version, 2x 8 mm and 2x 13.2 mm machine guns, 141 built.

J 22-2 or J 22B

Originally called J 22 FBv "Förbättrad Beväpning" (improved armament). Armed with 4x 13.2 mm machine guns, 57 built.

S 22-3 or S 22

Nine J 22-1 equipped for reconnaissance in 1946, restored to fighters in 1947. Used a spaningskamera Ska4 (recce camera Ska4) in the tail.

== Operators ==
Sweden

- Swedish Air Force

== Specifications (J 22A) ==
Data from F.F.V.S. J22 Fighter Aircraft

General characteristics

- Crew: 1
- Length: 7.8 m (25 ft 7 in)
- Wingspan: 10 m (32 ft 10 in)
- Height: 3.6 m (11 ft 10 in)
- Wing area: 16 m^{2} (170 sq ft)
- Aspect ratio: 6.25
- Airfoil: root: NACA 23015; tip: NACA 0012-64 mod.
- Empty weight: 2,020 kg (4,453 lb)

2,000 kg (4,409 lb) J 22A

- Gross weight: 2,835 kg (6,250 lb)

2,760 kg (6,085 lb) J 22A

- Powerplant: 1 × SFA STWC3-G or Pratt & Whitney R-1830-SC3-G Twin Wasp 14-cylinder air-cooled radial piston engine, 780 kW (1,050 hp) at 2,700 rpm

630 kW (850 hp) maximum continuous power

- Propellers: 3-bladed SFA / Hamilton Standard VP-2M, 3.1 m (10 ft 2 in) diameter constant-speed propeller

Performance

- Maximum speed: 575 km/h (357 mph, 310 kn) at combat power at 3,500 m (11,500 ft)

560 km/h (350 mph; 300 kn) at max. continuous power at 4,300 m (14,100 ft)
510 km/h (320 mph; 280 kn) at combat power at sea level
480 km/h (300 mph; 260 kn) at max. continuous power at sea level

- Cruise speed: 500 km/h (310 mph, 270 kn) at 75% power at 4,000 m (13,000 ft)
- Approach speed: 170–180 km/h (110–110 mph; 92–97 kn)
- Landing speed: 140 km/h (87 mph; 76 kn)
- Stall speed: 137 km/h (85 mph, 74 kn) landing configuration

165 km/h (103 mph; 89 kn) clean

- Never exceed speed: 650 km/h (400 mph, 350 kn) IAS
- Range: 1,270 km (790 mi, 690 nmi)
- Service ceiling: 9,300 m (30,500 ft) * Absolute ceiling: 13,000 m (43,000 ft)
- g limits: +6g (+10g ultimate) at 2,835 kg (6,250 lb)
- Rate of climb: 15.7 m/s (3,090 ft/min) max
- Wing loading: 177.2 kg/m^{2} (36.3 lb/sq ft)
- Power/mass: 0.28 kW/kg (0.17 hp/lb)

Armament

- Guns: 4 × 13.2 mm (0.520 in) akan m/39A with 250 rpg (FN Herstal M.1939 machine guns license built by LM Ericsson) J 22-2 / J 22B

J 22-1 / J 22A 2 × 8 mm (0.315 in) ksp m/22 with 500 rpg (license-built AN/M2 machine guns) + 2 × 13.2 mm (0.520 in) akan m/39A with 250 rpg

== See also ==
Aircraft of comparable role, configuration, and era

- Bloch MB.157
- CAC Boomerang
- Focke-Wulf Fw 190
- IAR 80
- Koolhoven FK.58
- Mitsubishi A6M
- Nakajima Ki-43
- Reggiane Re.2002
- VL Myrsky
