= Sparmann S-1 =

1930s Swedish military training monoplane

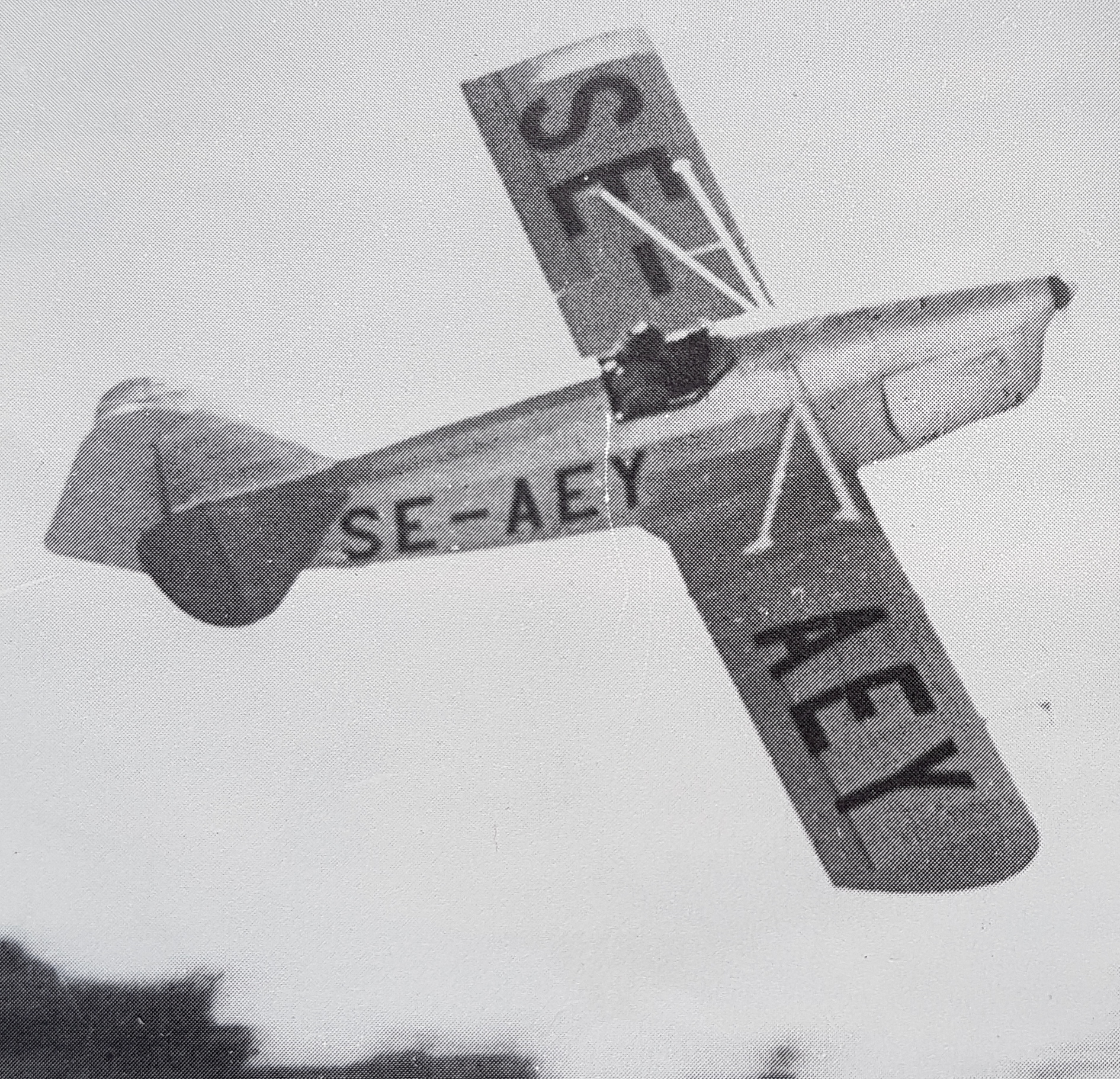
- Sparmann S-1.

General information
- Type: Training monoplane
- National origin: Sweden
- Manufacturer: Sparmann
- Primary user: Swedish Air Force

The Sparmann S-1 was a 1930s Swedish military training monoplane, designed by Edmund Sparmann, built in small numbers for the Swedish Air Force. The S-1 was a single-seat low-wing braced-monoplane with a fixed trail-skid landing gear. It was powered by a single 130 hp (97 kW) de Havilland Gipsy Major engine.

== Operators ==
Sweden
Swedish Air Force

== Specifications ==
Data from

General characteristics

- Crew: 1
- Length: 6.18 m (20 ft 3 in)
- Wingspan: 8 m (26 ft 3 in)
- Wing area: 8.34 m^{2} (89.8 sq ft)
- Empty weight: 417 kg (919 lb)
- Gross weight: 630 kg (1,389 lb) normal; 585 kg (1,290 lb) aerobatic
- Max takeoff weight: 625 kg (1,378 lb)
- Fuel capacity: 120 L (32 US gal; 26 imp gal) in a fuselage tank
- Powerplant: 1 × de Havilland Gipsy Major 4-cyl. inverted air-cooled in-line piston engine, 97 kW (130 hp)

Performance

- Maximum speed: 250 km/h (160 mph, 130 kn) aerobatic
- Cruise speed: 210 km/h (130 mph, 110 kn)
- Range: 880 km (550 mi, 480 nmi) at cruise
- Service ceiling: 6,000 m (20,000 ft) service ceiling
- Rate of climb: 7.59 m/s (1,495 ft/min)
- Time to altitude: 1,000 m (3,300 ft) in 2.5 minutes

2,000 m (6,600 ft) in 5.3 minutes
4,000 m (13,000 ft) in 14.7 minutes
5,000 m (16,000 ft) in 24.4 minutes

- Wing loading: 75 kg/m^{2} (15 lb/sq ft) normal; 70.2 kg/m^{2} (14.4 lb/sq ft)
- Power/mass: 0.155 kW/kg (0.094 hp/lb) normal; 0.1715 kW/kg (0.1043 hp/lb) aerobatic

== See also ==
Related lists

- List of military aircraft of Sweden
