= Swedish Armed Forces Helicopter Wing =

- Försvarsmaktens helikopterflottilj
- Active: 1998–present
- Country: Sweden
- Allegiance: Swedish Armed Forces
- Branch: Swedish Air Force
- Garrison/HQ: Kallax, Malmen, Kallinge
- Mottos: Semper parati ("Always ready")
- March: "Adlerflug" (Hermann Ludwig Blankenburg)

Commanders
- Current commander: COL Niklas Blomberg
- Notable commanders: Micael Bydén

Insignia
- Roundels

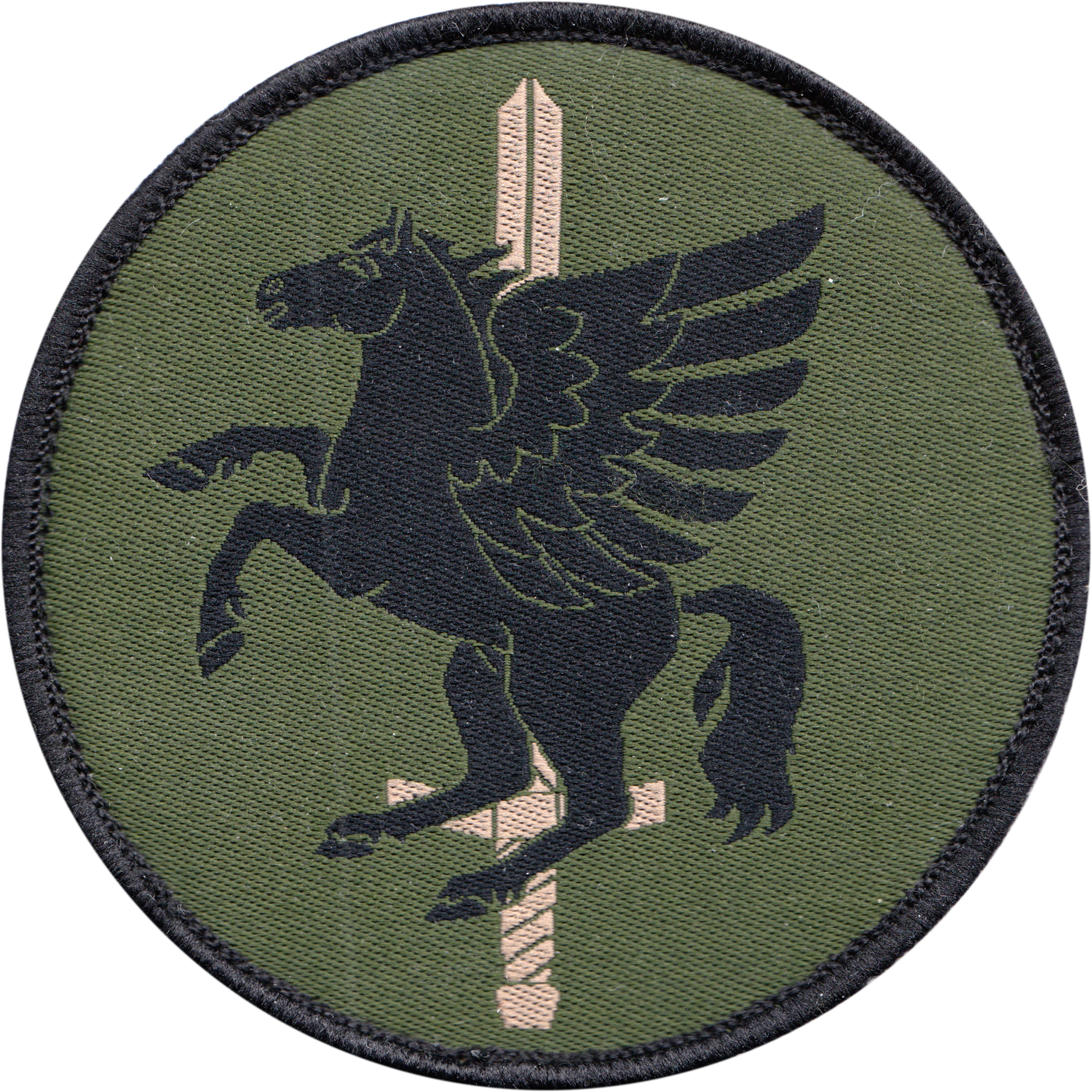
- Military patch

Aircraft flown
- Multirole helicopter: HKP 14, HKP 15, HKP 16

The Swedish Armed Forces Helicopter Wing (Swedish: Försvarsmaktens helikopterflottilj, Hkpflj) organizes all Swedish Armed Forces military helicopter operations. The unit was formed in 1998 by merging the Army, Air Force and Navy helicopter resources. The unit is located in three places in Sweden, with headquarters at Malmen Airbase in Linköping.

== History ==
The unit was formed on 1 January 1998. The Air Force, Army and Navy no longer had their own helicopters but were part of the Swedish Armed Forces Helicopter Wing as an asset for all service branches. Sweden was the first in the world to introduce this type of organisation. From the beginning, the unit was directly subordinate to the Supreme Commander of the Swedish Armed Forces and the Swedish Armed Forces Headquarters. The inauguration, which was performed by Vice Admiral Peter Nordbeck, took place on 3 February 1998 outside Linköping. This nationwide wing, which is led from Malmen Airbase (the district of Malmslätt in Linköping) would from 1 January 1999 have four battalions:

- 1st, Norrland Helicopter Battalion (Norrlands Helikopterbataljon) had Boden as its main base, with additional locations at F 21 Luleå, Lycksele, F 4 Frösön and Sundsvall.
- 2nd, Svea Helicopter Battalion (Svea Helikopterbataljon) was based at Berga in the Stockholm archipelago. Additional locations are F 16 Uppsala and Visby.
- 3rd, Göta Helicopter Battalion (Göta Helikopterbataljon) has its main base at F 17 Kallinge. The battalion also conducts extensive operations at the Säve base outside Gothenburg, as well as at F 7 Såtenäs.
- 4th, Östgöta Helicopter Battalion (Östgöta Helikopterbataljon) is based at Malmen Airbase in Linköping.

Captain Håkan Neckman became the first wing commander. The wing was to be led by the staff at Malmslätt outside Linköping. It was staffed by 19 professional officers and four civilians. The basic organization included about 1,000 people - of which 640 were professional officers and 90 civilian employees. Another 1,000 people are added to the war organization, of which 155 are reserve officers. In total, the helicopter wing had just over 120 helicopters, divided into seven types.

On 1 January 2003, the wing became part of the Air Force's organization. Operationally, helicopter operations were led by the Air Force Tactical Command within the Swedish Armed Forces Headquarters' Joint Forces Command, occupationally it is under the Inspector of the Air Force in the General Training and Management Directorate (Grundorganisationsledningen).

== Organization ==
The Helicopter Wing is spread across Sweden with three helicopter squadrons (as well as a stand-alone unit):

Unit designation	Unit name	Location	Helicopter type	Focus
1. hkpskv	1st Helicopter Squadron	Luleå	HKP 14	Land
2. hkpskv	2nd Helicopter Squadron	Linköping	HKP 15; HKP 16	Land
3. hkpskv	3rd Helicopter Squadron	Ronneby	HKP 14; HKP 15	Sea
SHG	Special Helicopter Group	Linköping	HKP 15; HKP 16	Special operations

== Commanding officers ==
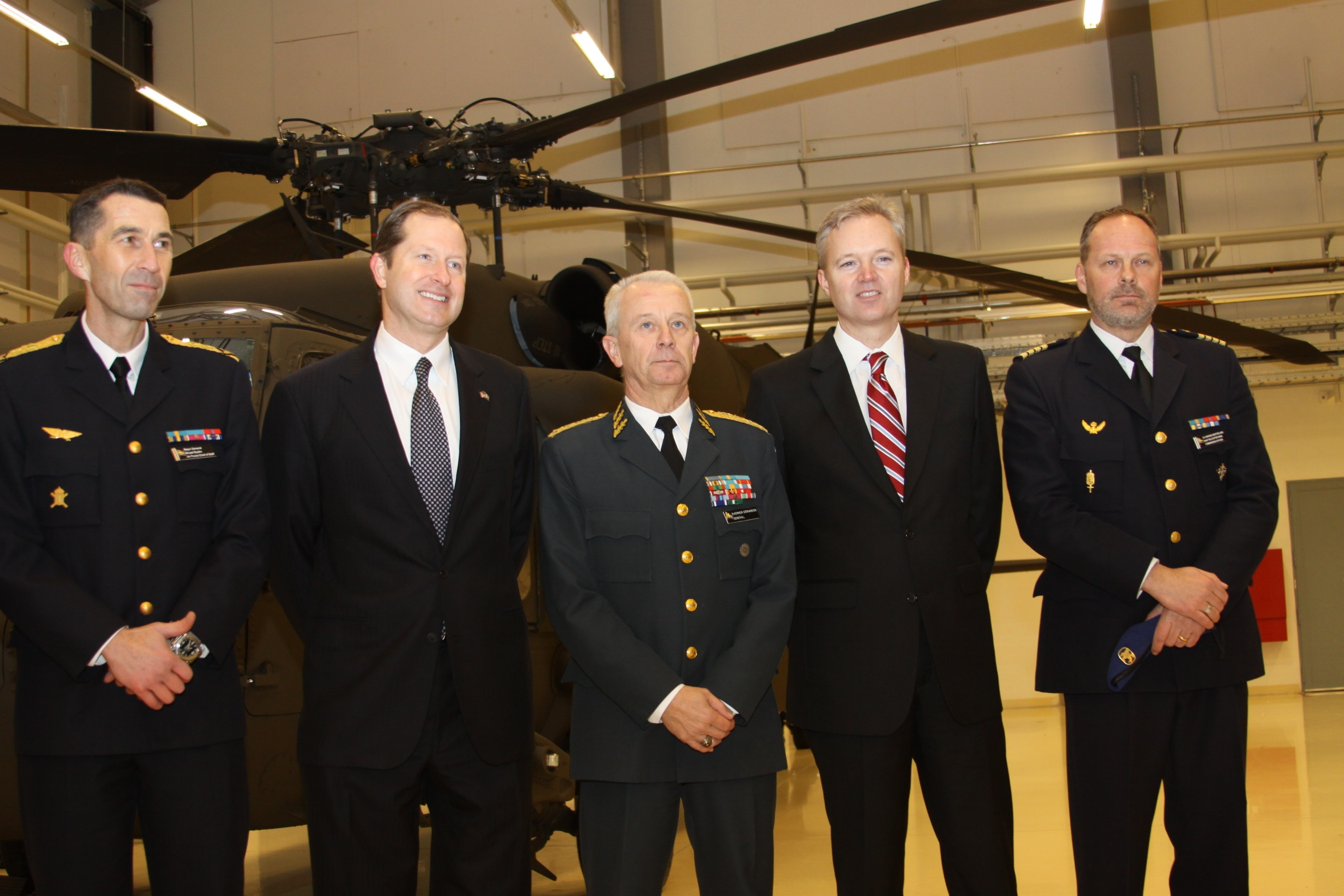
Chief of Air Force, Major General Micael Bydén (left), Supreme Commander, General Sverker Göranson (middle) and wing commander, Colonel Magnus Westerlund (right).

=== Commanders ===
- 1998–2002: Captain Håkan Neckman
- 2002–2005: Colonel Mats Westin
- 2005–2008: Colonel Johan Svensson
- 2008–2009: Colonel Micael Bydén
- 2009–2014: Colonel Magnus Westerlund
- 2014–2017: Colonel Peder Söderström
- 2017–2021: Colonel Jonas Nellsjö
- 2021–2025: Colonel Mats Antonson
- 2025–20xx: Colonel Niklas Blomberg

=== Deputy commanders ===
- 2 October 2024 – present: Colonel Mats-Uno Runeson

== Heraldry and traditions ==
=== Colours, standards and guidons ===
From the start, the Helicopter Wing presented one battalion flag, one battalion colour and one squadron colour. A wing colour was then planned but still not decided. In 2009, the wing received a colour of its own.

==== Description of the wing colour ====
On 27 May 2009, the Supreme Commander of the Swedish Armed Forces, General Sverker Göranson, on behalf of His Majesty the King, handed over the new colour to the commander of the helicopter wing, Colonel Micael Bydén. The colour of the helicopter wing symbolizes the wing's origin from army, navy and air force helicopter units. The colour took just over seven months to complete. The heraldic artist in this case is Kristina Holmgård and she who embroidered the colour is called Gertie Frid, with the help of Inger Broström and Gunnel Andersson. The colour has a blue cloth with the air force's winged propeller with a crown. Since the Helicopter Wing has been part of the Air Force since 2003, the new colour is of the same model as the Air Force's other colours, with the exception that the royal crown over the winged propeller has a red lining. In the corners, the traditions from the previous units are carried on. In the place of honor, the inner, upper corner, there is a Pegasus that symbolizes the Helicopter Wing. In the other corners are the symbols for the Naval Aviation, Army Air Force and the Air Force's helicopter groups.

==== Description of the 1. hkpdiv flag ====
A double swallowtailed Swedish flag. The flag was presented to the then 1st Helicopter Division (1. helikopterdivisionen, 1.hkpdiv/marinen) in 1976.

==== Description of AF 1 colour ====
Blazon: "On blue cloth a slanted one-winged yellow sword. In the first corner the white reindeer at speed of the provincial badge of Västerbotten". The colour is drawn by Ingrid Lamby and embroidered by hand in insertion technique by the company Libraria. The colour was presented to the then Norrbotten Army Air Battalion (Norrbottens arméflygbataljon, AF 1) in Boden by His Majesty the King Carl XVI Gustaf on 27 September 1984. It was used as battalion colour by AF 1 until 1 July 2000.

==== Description of AF 2 colour ====
Blazon: "On blue cloth a slanted one-winged yellow sword. In the first corner the provincial badge of Östergötland; a yellow griffin, armed red between four white roses". The colour is drawn by Ingrid Lamby and embroidered by machine in insertion technique by the company Libraria. The colour was presented to the then Östgöta Army Air Battalion (Östgöta arméflygbataljon, AF 2) at Malmen Airbase by His Majesty the King Carl XVI Gustaf on 27 May 1988.

=== Coat of arms ===
Blazon: "Azure, a pegasus salient or. The shield surmounting an erect sword of the last colour".

=== Medals ===
In 2005, the Helikopterflottiljens (Hkpflj) förtjänstmedalj ("Swedish Armed Forces Helicopter Wing (Hkpflj) Medal of Merit") in gold (HkpfljGM) of the 8th size was established. The medal ribbon is of blue moiré with narrow yellow edges and two yellow lines on each side.

In 2005, the Helikopterflottiljens (Hkpflj) skvadronsminnesmedaljer ("Swedish Armed Forces Helicopter Wing (Hkpflj) Squadron Commemorative Medals") in silver (HkpfljMSM) of the 8th size were established. The medals has different reverses. The medal ribbon is of blue moiré with narrow yellow edges and two yellow lines on each side. A squadron figure in silver is attached to the ribbon.

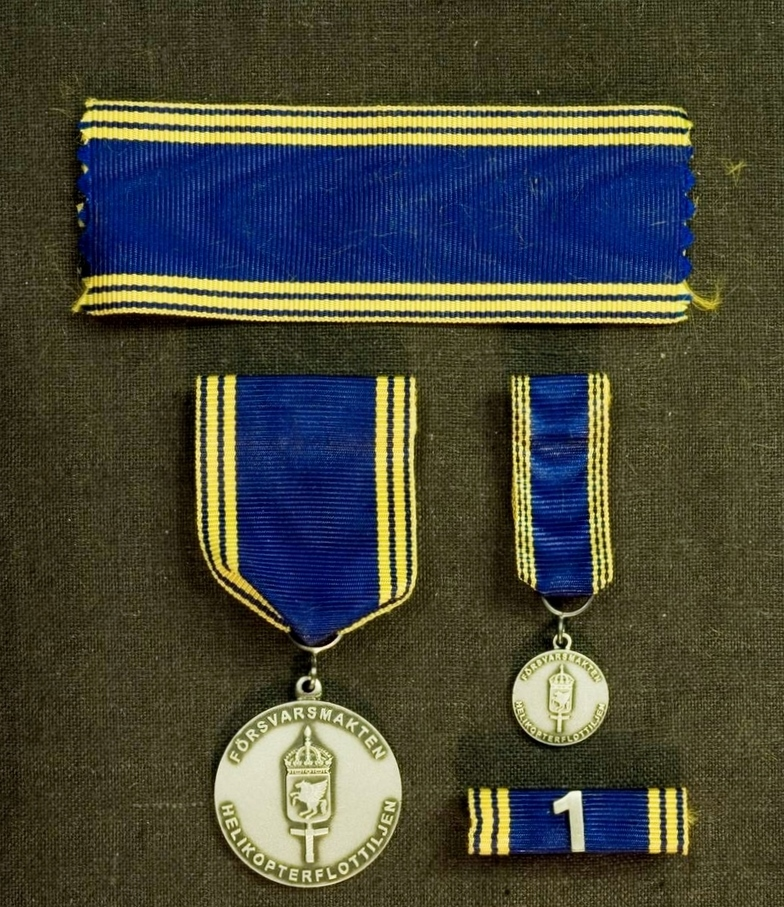
Commemorative medal for the 1st squadron.

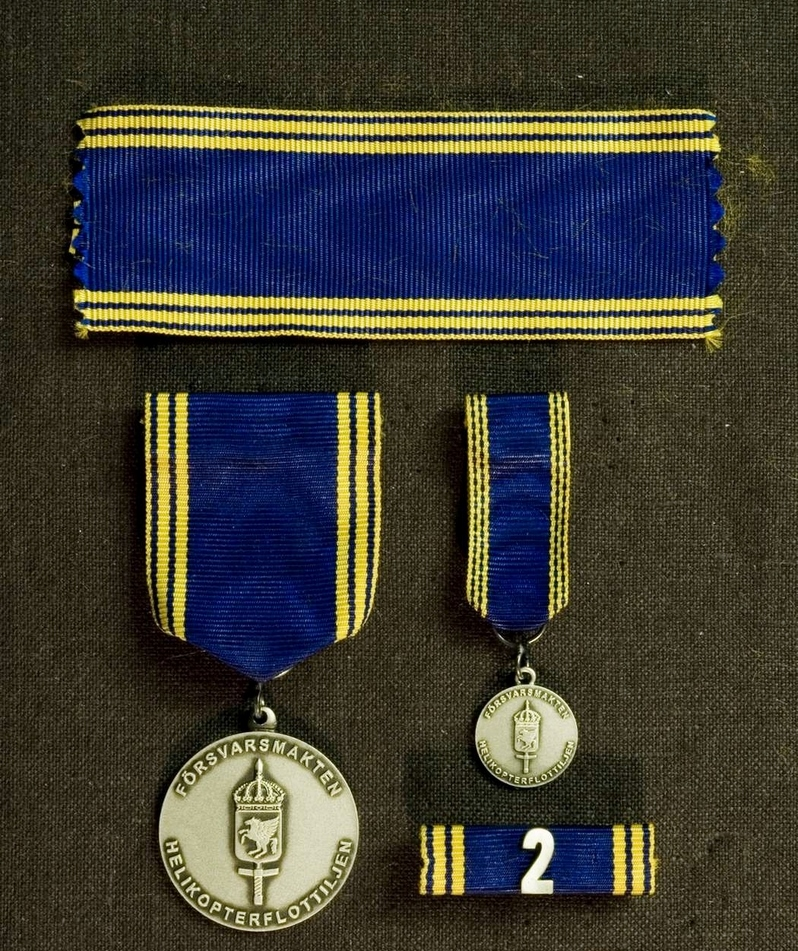
Commemorative medal for the 2nd squadron.

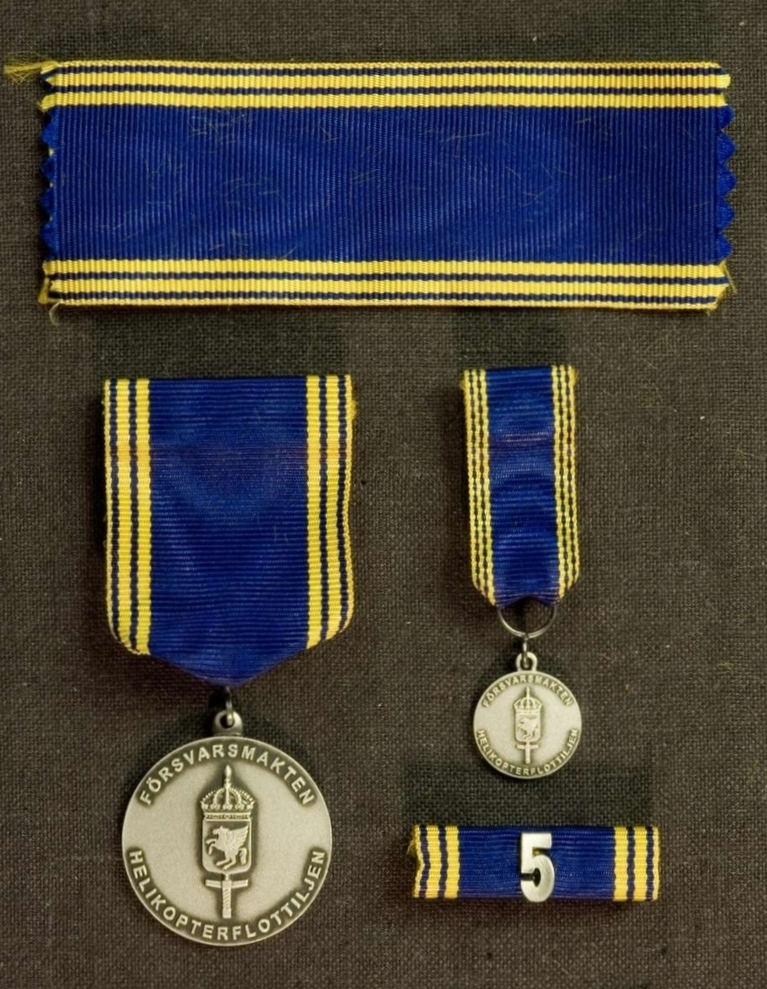
Commemorative medal for the 5th squadron.

=== Traditions ===
The unit carries traditions from the following units: Arméflygcentrum (AFC), Norrbotten Army Air Battalion (Norrbottens arméflygbataljon, AF 1), Östgöta Army Air Battalion (Östgöta arméflygbataljon, AF 2), Marinflygledningen (MFlygL), Norrland Helicopter Battalion (Norrlands helikopterbataljon, 1. hkpbat), Svea Helicopter Battalion (Svea helikopterbataljon, 2. hkpbat), Göta Helicopter Battalion (Göta helikopterbataljon, 3. hkpbat), Östgöta Helicopter Battalion (Östgöta helikopterbataljon, 4. hkpbat), 11th Helicopter Division (11. helikopterdivisionen, 11. hkpdiv), 12th Helicopter Division (12. helikopterdivisionen, 12. hkpdiv), 13th Helicopter Division (13. helikopterdivisionen, 13. hkpdiv), Marinflygledningen (MFlygfL) and the Life Grenadier Regiment (I 4).

The unit preserves the memory of the following units: Swedish Army Helicopter School (Arméns helikopterskola, HkpS), Artilleriflygskolan (ArtFlygS), Hkpgrp KAX, FRÖ, UPP, RBY, SÅT, ÄNG, Östgöta Wing (F 3) and the Bråvalla Wing (F 13).
