= Kallinge =

- Location within Blekinge Location within Sweden
- Coordinates: 56°14′N 15°17′E
- Country: Sweden
- Province: Blekinge
- County: Blekinge County
- Municipality: Ronneby Municipality

Area
  - Total: 4.85 km^{2} (1.87 sq mi)

Population (31 December 2010)
  - Total: 4,561
  - Density: 940/km^{2} (2,400/sq mi)
- Time zone: UTC+1 (CET)
  - Summer (DST): UTC+2 (CEST)

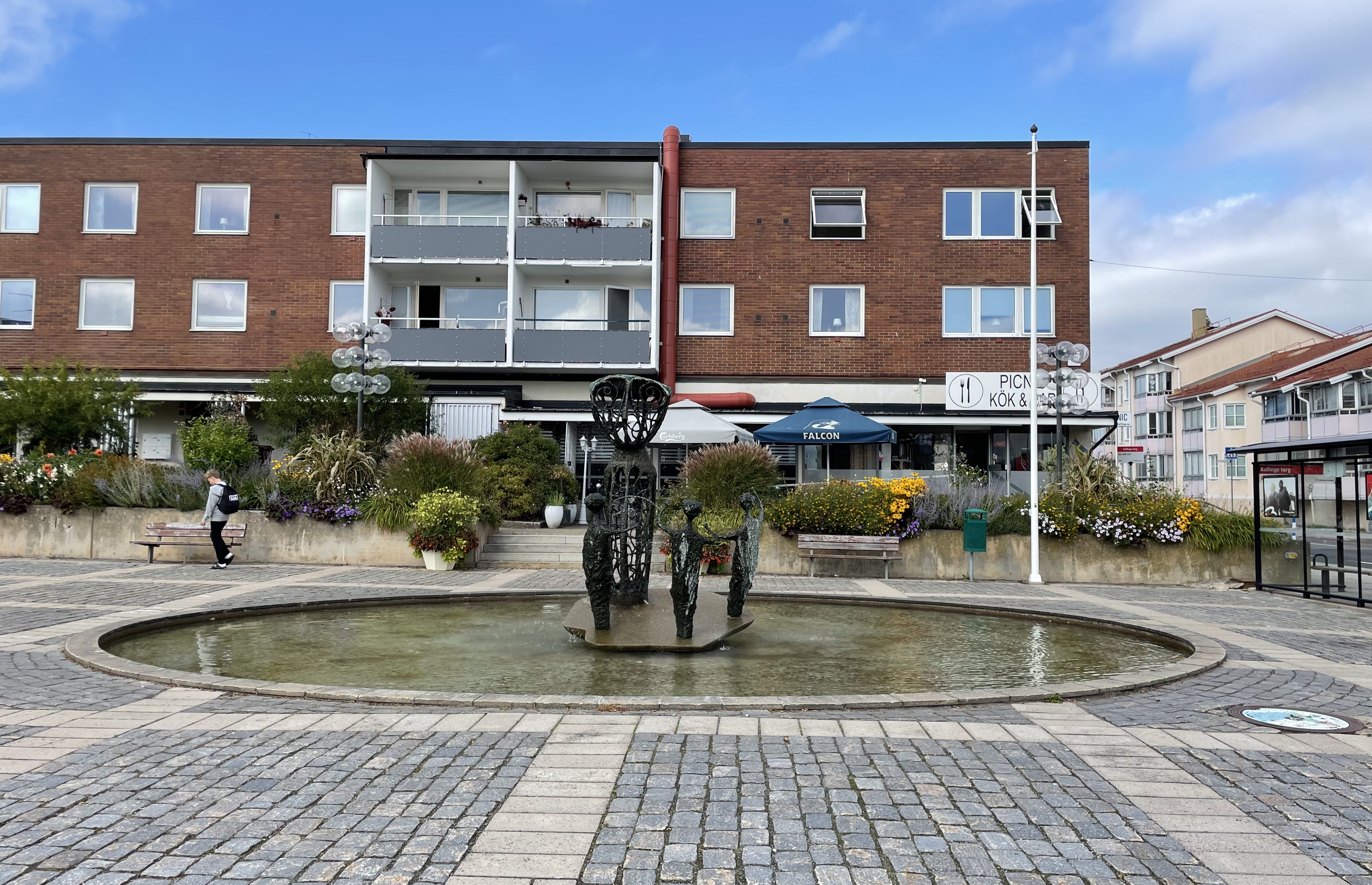
The square in Kallinge (2023).

Kallinge is a locality situated in Ronneby Municipality, Blekinge County, Sweden with 4,561 inhabitants in 2010. It is an industrial and garrison town and is situated about 5 km north of Ronneby.

The settlement grew up around an ironworks in the latter half of the 19th century. In early days there was a linear settlement at the east side of Ronnebyån called Kalleberga; given the name of the village, Kallinge.

Since 1944 Kallinge has had an air force base (Blekinge Wing). It is also an airport for civil aircraft called Ronneby Airport.
