= Scania Wing =

Coordinates: 56.2850°N 12.8400°E

- Skånska flygflottiljen
- Active: 1940–2002
- Country: Sweden
- Allegiance: Swedish Armed Forces
- Branch: Swedish Air Force
- Type: Wing (1940–1957); Sector wing (1957–1994); Wing (1994–2002)
- Role: Fighter (1940–1993); Fighter/Reconnaissance (1993–1999); Multi (1999–2002)
- Part of: 3rd Air Command (1944–1948); 2nd Air Command (1948–1966); Milo S (1966–2000); OPIL (2000–2002)
- Garrison/HQ: Ängelholm
- March: "Internationell gemenskap" (Ottervik) (Note: The march was established on 9 September 1980.)

Insignia
- Roundels

Aircraft flown
- Attack: AJS 37
- Bomber: B 4, B 5, B 17
- Fighter: J 8, J 20, J 22, J 21R, J 29, J 34, J 35
- Multirole helicopter: Hkp 3B
- Reconnaissance: AJSF 37, AJSH 37
- Trainer: Sk 11, Sk 12, Sk 14, Sk 15, Sk 16, Sk 25, Sk 50, Sk 60
- G 101, Se 102, Se 103, Se 104, JAS 39A/B

Scania Wing (Swedish: Skånska flygflottiljen), also F 10 Ängelholm, or simply F 10, is a former Swedish Air Force wing with the main base located in southernmost Sweden.

== History ==
The tenth wing initially started as a detachment located at Svea Wing (F 8) during the summer of 1940 but was relocated to Bulltofta Airport near Malmö on October 1, 1940 to deter foreign aircraft during the war. The first aircraft were two squadrons of older J 8's from Svea Wing (F 8) wing which served for only one year until they were replaced by three squadrons of the J 20's.

In 1941, it was decided to transfer the wing to a new base at Barkåkra near Ängelholm. In 1945 the wing was completely transferred and equipped with J 22 fighters. However, the grass field was too soft and full flight operations could not be undertaken until 1947 when one runway was paved.

In 1949 the squadrons replaced the J 22s with J 21R jets which only served two years until being replaced by J 28B in 1951. These also only served for two years until in turn being replaced by the J 29 which served until 1963.

While waiting for the new J 35, two of the squadrons replaced their J 29s with J 34 from Södertörn Wing (F 18) until the wing was fully converted in 1969. The J 35 served F 10 for a total of 34 years across several upgrades until they were replaced initially by the AJS 37 in one squadron in 1993 and then the JAS 39 in the two remaining squadrons in 1999.

In 1996, the duty of basic flying training for the Swedish Air Force was transferred from the Swedish Air Force Flying School (F 5) to F 10 together with one squadron of SK 60 trainers.

The wing was decommissioned on 31 December 2002 as a result of the disarmament policies set forward in the Defence Act of 2000. A ceremony of the decommissioning was held on 20 December 2002. A large part of the staff was present, the then incoming Inspector of the Air Force major general Jan Andersson and invited guests. At the ceremony, the wing's colour was handed over to the commander of the Blekinge Wing (F 17) in Ronneby. A symbolic sign that F 17 is taking over the traditional responsibility for F 10. F 17 has taken over the personnel from and operation of the air surveillance and combat command center in Hässleholm, as well as F 10's Gripen aircraft. At the wing's area in Ängelholm, in 2003 there was a small staff in a decommissioning organization that would empty all premises. Demolition work on some buildings was then underway, including a hangar that has been specially built for Gripen. The wing's area was classified as a military object of protection throughout 2003, but after that the Swedish Armed Forces left the site.

The premises are currently owned by the construction company PEAB. Koenigsegg Automotive has their factories and office located in former F 10 buildings. The F 10 first squadron's 'ghost' is also placed on all Koenigsegg cars. The flight museum of Ängelholm is also located on the premises.

== Barracks and training areas ==
The civilian airfield Bulltofta in Malmö during the years 1940-1945 and the airfields in Rinkaby, Ripa and Sövdeborg. The wing moved between 10 September and 27 October 1945 to Barkåkra (Engeltofta estate) outside Ängelholm.

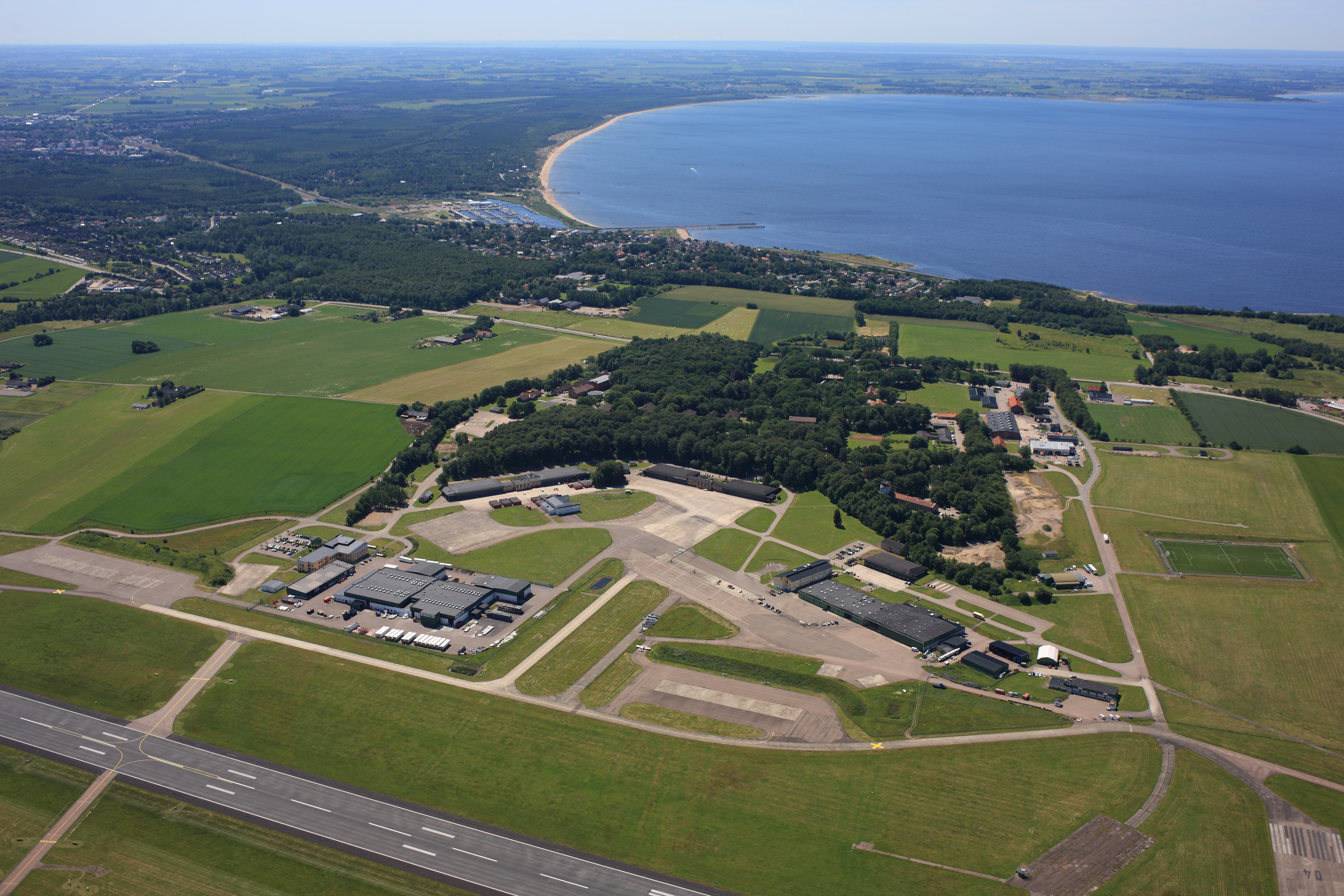
Aerial view

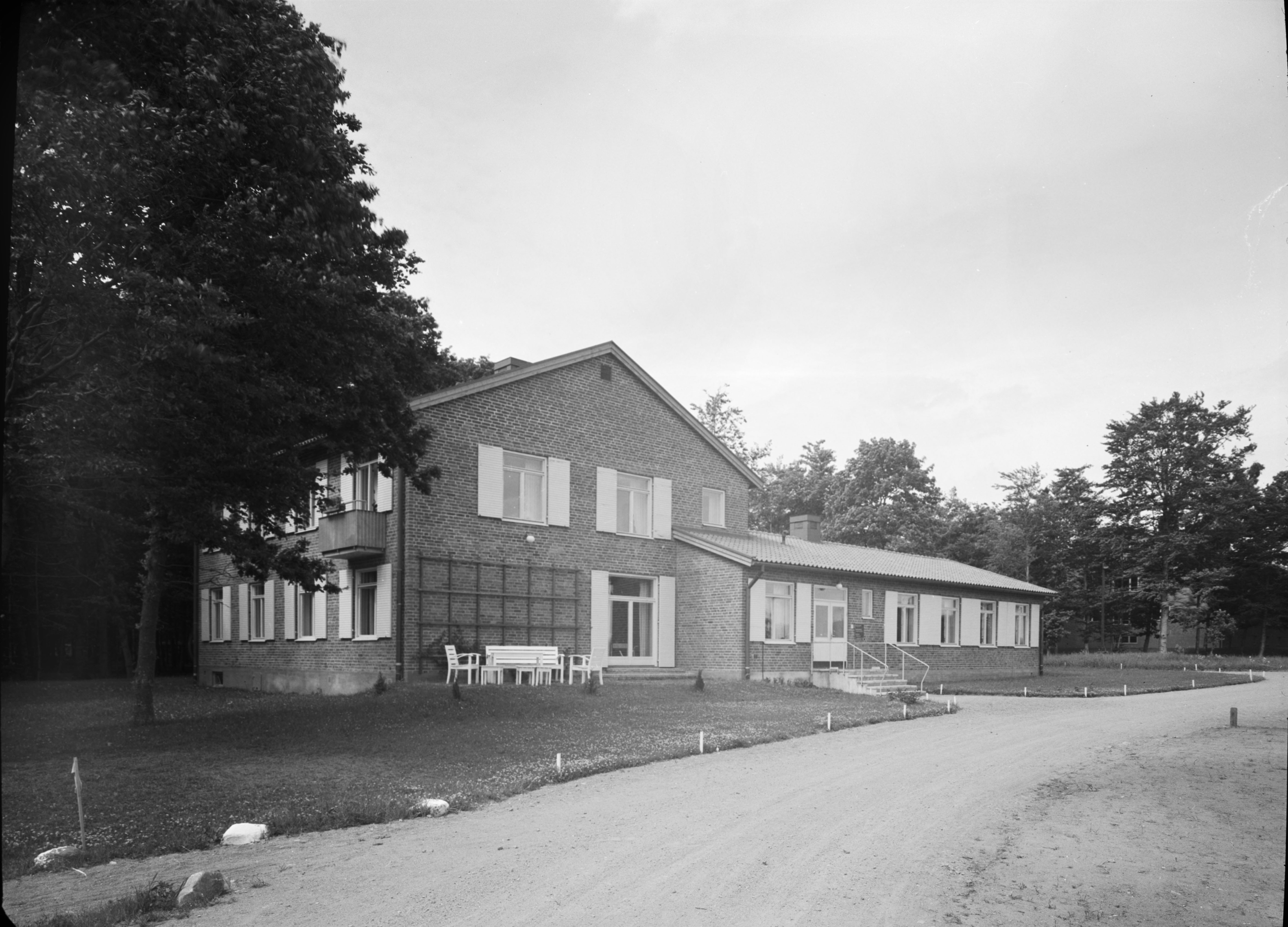
Hospital building

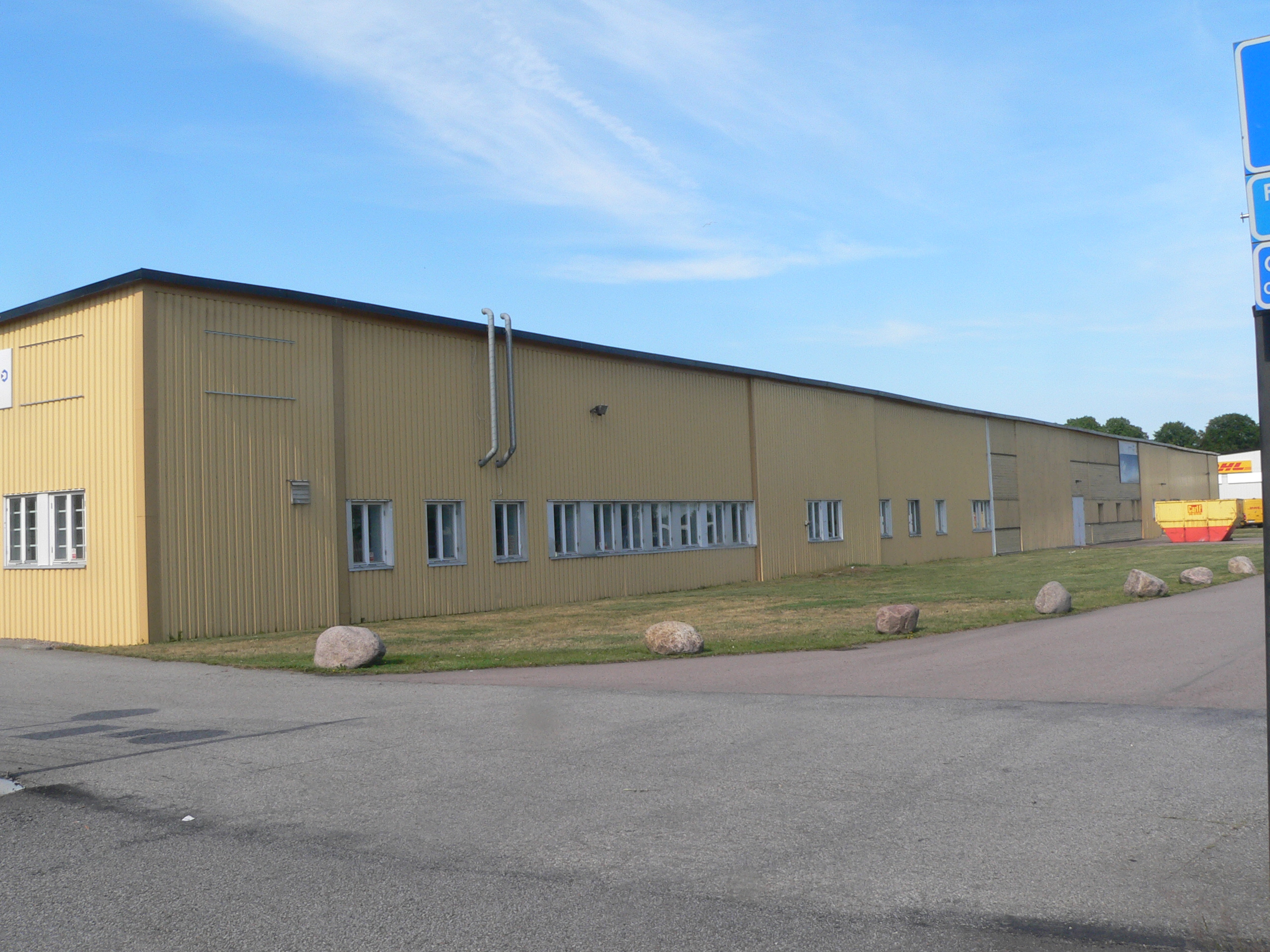
Former hangar

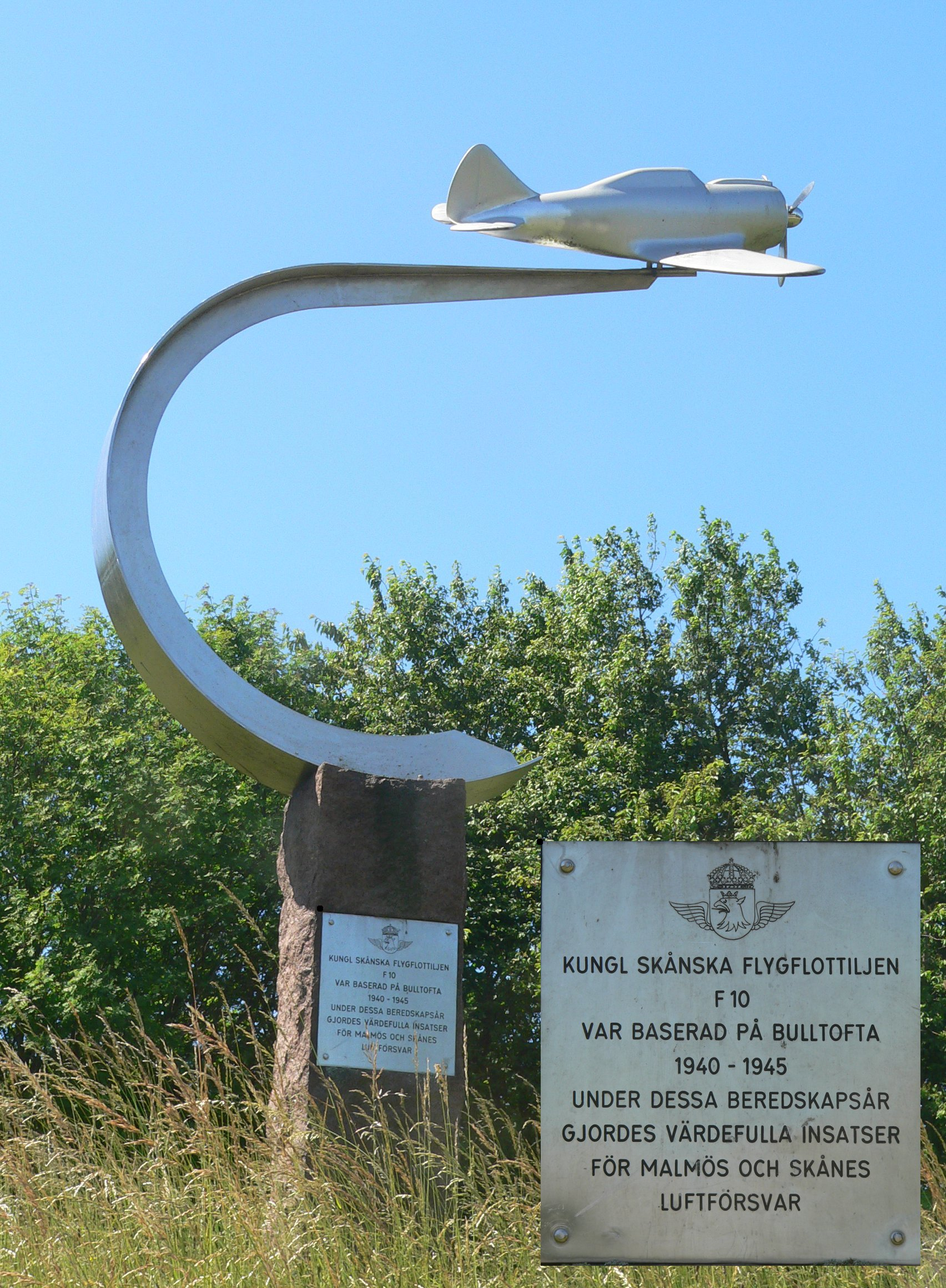
Monument at Bulltofta

== Heraldry and traditions ==
=== Coat of arms ===
The first coat of arms of the Scania Wing was used from 1940 to 1994. Blazon: "Or, the provincial badge of Scania, an erazed head of a griffin gules with open crown and arms azure." The second coat of arms was used from 1994 to 2002. Blazon: "Or, the provincial badge of Scania, an erazed head of a griffin gules, with open crown and arms azure, a chief azure charged with a winged twobladed propeller or.

Coat of arms used from 1940 to 1994.

Coat of arms used from 1994 to 2002.

=== Colours, standards and guidons ===
The colour was presented to the wing at F 8 Barkarby by His Majesty the King Gustaf V on 17 September 1943. It was handed over to Blekinge Wing (F 17) as a traditional colour when F 10 was disbanded on 31 December 2002. The colour is drawn by Brita Grep and embroidered by hand in insertion technique by the company Libraria. Blazon: "On blue cloth in the centre the badge of the Air Force; a winged two-bladed propeller under a royal crown proper, all in yellow. In the first corner the provincial badge of Skåne; an erazed yellow head of a griffin with an open crown, armed red."

From 1998 to 2002, the wing also carried the colour of the former Swedish Air Force Flying School (F 5).

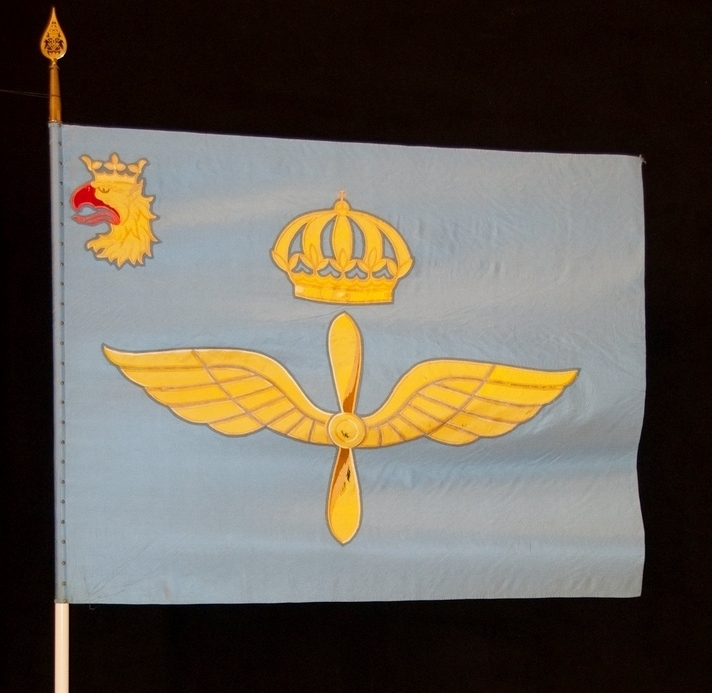
The 1943 colour.

=== March ===
"Internationell gemenskap" was composed by chief librarian Gösta Ottervik. It was established on 9 September 1980.

== Commanding officers ==
Commanding officers from 1940 to 2002. From 1940 to 1974, the commanding officers was referred to as flottiljchef ("wing commander") and had the rank of lieutenant colonel for the first two years. From 1942, the commanding officer had the rank of colonel. From 1974 to 1994, the wing commander was referred to as sektorflottiljchef ("sector wing commander") and had the rank of senior colonel. From 1994 to 2002, the commanding officer was again referred to as flottiljchef ("wing commander"), and had the rank of colonel.

=== Corps, wing and sector wing commanders ===
- 1940–1946: Knut Zachrisson
- 1946–1956: Bill Bergman
- 1956–1960: Wilhelm Wagner
- 1960–1962: Claes Henrik Nordenskiöld
- 1962–1966: Ian Iacobi
- 1966–1969: Kjell Rasmusson
- 1969–1979: Ulf Cappelen-Smith
- 1979–1985: Anders Sjöberg
- 1985–1987: Bertil Bjäre
- 1987–1992: Rolf Clementson
- 1993–1994: Mats Hugosson
- 1994–1994: Mats Hellstrand
- 1995–1999: Kjell Öfverberg
- 1999–2001: Tomas Fjellner
- 2001–2002: Hans Hansson

=== Deputy sector wing commanders ===
In order to relieve the sector wing commander, a deputy sector wing commander position was added in 1974. Its task was to lead the unit procurement, a task largely similar to the old wing commander position. Hence he was also referred to as flottiljchef ("wing commander"). The deputy sector wing commander had the rank of colonel. On 30 June 1994, the deputy sector wing commander position was terminated.

- 1974–1980: Bertil Bjäre
- 1980–1985: Sten Norrmo
- 1985–1987: Gunnar Ståhl
- 1987–1989: Sten Öhlander
- 1989–1991: Göte Pudas
- 1991–1993: Mats Hugosson

== Names, designations and locations ==
Name	Translation	From		To
Wendes flygflottilj	Wendes Wing	xxxx-xx-xx	–	xxxx-xx-xx
Tionde flygflottiljen	10th Wing	1940-10-01	–	1942-06-30
Kungl. Skånska flygflottiljen	Royal Scania Wing	1942-07-01	–	1974-12-31
Skånska flygflottiljen	Scania Wing; Scania Air Group	1975-01-01	–	2002-12-31
Avvecklingsorganisation Ängelholm	Decommissioning Organization Ängelholm	2003-01-01	–	2003-12-31
Designation		From		To
F 10		1940-07-01	–	1957-09-30
F 10/Se S1		1957-10-01	–	1981-06-30
F 10/Se S		1981-07-01	–	1993-06-30
F 10/FK S		1993-07-01	–	1994-06-30
F 10		1994-07-01	–	2002-12-31
Ao Äng		2003-01-01	–	2003-12-31
Location		From		To
Ängelholm Airport		1945-10-01	–	2003-12-31

== See also ==
- List of military aircraft of Sweden
