= Ronneby Bloodbath =

1564 massacre in Ronneby, present-day Sweden

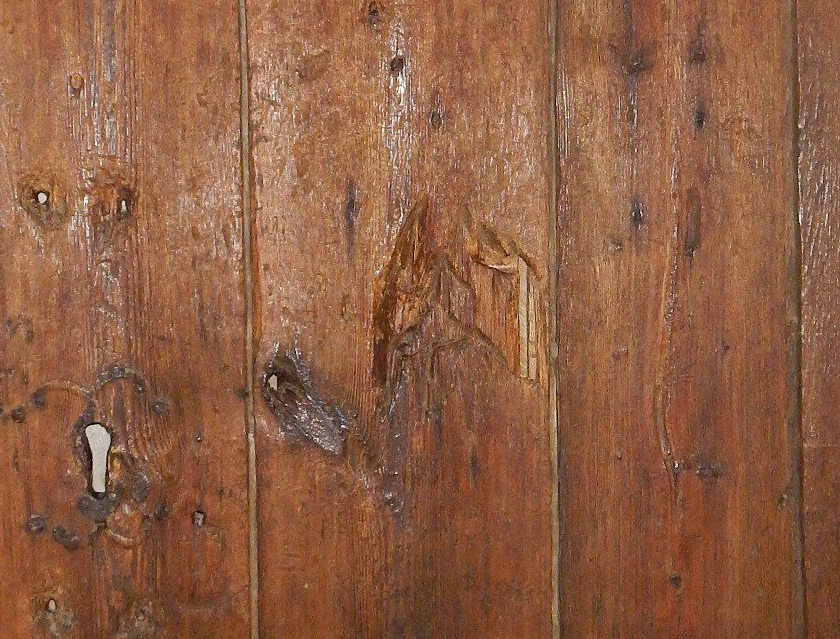
Carvings on the gate of the Church of the Holy Cross in Ronneby, which according to tradition occurred when Swedish soldiers tried to enter the church during the Ronneby massacre

Ronneby Bloodbath (Swedish: Ronneby blodbad) was a massacre conducted by the Swedish army in the then-Danish city of Ronneby in Blekinge during the Northern Seven Years' War on Monday, September 4th 1564.

== Campaign ==
During the Swedish invasion of the Danish province of Blekinge, the soldiers in the far back of the marching Swedish army were taken captive by the locals and hanged from the trees in the country side. In retaliation, King Eric XIV of Sweden gave the order that all lands between Lyckeby and Ronneby were free to pillage, killing and burning by the army.

On 3 September 1564, the Swedish army reached the Danish city of Ronneby, which was at that point a flourishing and wealthy merchant city. The city lacked proper defense fortifications or a garrison, but likely expected to be given assistance from the Danish troops, which were positioned some miles away. The city refused to surrender to the Swedes despite been given two opportunities to do so. When the Swedish army stormed the city early on the morning of 4 September, they quickly pulled down the temporary palisade which was its only defense and, with no soldiers defending it, pillaged the city and massacred its inhabitants in accordance with the order of scorched earth issued by Eric XIV.

Eric XIV wrote of the storming of the city: "The water in the Ronneby [river] was red by the blood from dead bodies. And were the enemies so meek, that one did not bother much with them, but cut them down as a horde of wild boars, and spared no one but killed all that was there, so that in the city there were more than two thousand men killed by their throats aside for some women and children, whom the miserable Finns beat to death". A great fortune was taken as war price including silver and gold, household goods, wine and salt and many more goods stored by the city merchants, and much of the city was burned down during the pillage.

== Aftermath ==
When the pillage was over, Eric XIV gave the order that the surviving inhabitants were to be gathered and resettled in Sweden proper. This has been interpreted that he intended to keep the province of Blekinge, and populate it with loyal Swedish and Finnish colonists. This plan, however, was never put in action because of the swift change of the war situation shortly after.

Whether Eric XIV was actually present in Ronneby during the bloodbath is unknown; the day after, he is known to have been in Lyckå, and the day after that, he was already on his way back to Kalmar.

The Ronneby Bloodbath was frequently used as propaganda by both Sweden and Denmark-Norway during the war: the Swedes to demonstrate a well deserved victory by Eric XIV, and the Danes to gather more resistance toward the Swedes among by pointing to the cruelty during the Ronneby Bloodbath. In practice, the bloodbath in Ronneby was not unusual in accordance with contemporary war custom, where a city taken by storm was left to be pillaged by the conquerors. Many leading citizens of the city are known to have survived, among them its mayor, Birger Jonsson.
