= Blekinge Wing =

Coordinates: 56.2553°N 15.2844°E

- Blekinge flygflottilj
- Active: 1944–present
- Country: Sweden
- Allegiance: Swedish Armed Forces
- Branch: Swedish Air Force
- Type: Wing
- Role: Marine (1944–1956); Attack (1956–1973); Attack/Fighter (1973–1975); Fighter (1975–1979); Fighter/Recon (1979–1993); Fighter (1993–2002); Multi (2002–present)
- Garrison/HQ: Kallinge
- Motto: Styrka genom samverkan ("Strength through collaboration")
- March: "Blekinge flygflottiljs marsch" (Dohlin) (Note: The march was adopted and established on 13 June 1984.)

Commanders
- Current commander: COL Christoffer Gruv

Insignia
- Roundels

Aircraft flown
- Attack: ~~A 21R~~, ~~A 32A~~
- Bomber: ~~B 3~~, ~~B 4~~, ~~B 5~~, ~~B 17~~
- Fighter: ~~J 35F~~, ~~JA 37~~
- Multirole helicopter: ~~Hkp 3B~~, ~~Hkp 4A~~, ~~Hkp 10A~~
- Reconnaissance: ~~SF 37~~, ~~SH 37~~, ~~AJSF 37~~
- Trainer: ~~Sk 12~~, ~~Sk 15~~, ~~Sk 16~~, ~~Sk 25~~, ~~Sk 50~~
- Transport: ~~Tp 83~~, ~~TP 87~~, ~~TP 101~~, ~~TP 103~~
- ~~G 101~~, ~~Se 102~~, ~~Se 103~~, ~~Se 104~~, ~~T 18B~~, ~~JAS 39A~~, JAS 39C

Blekinge Wing (Swedish: Blekinge flygflottilj), also F 17 Kallinge, or simply F 17, is a Swedish Air Force wing with the main base located near Ronneby in southern Sweden. The wing also operates the air base on the island of Gotland in the Baltic Sea. It is one of four wings in Sweden and currently has two squadrons of JAS-39 C/D fighter aircraft.

== History ==
F 17 was established on the Bredåkra moor in 1944 under the name of Kungliga Blekinge Flygflottilj, The Royal Blekinge Air Wing. The moor had been used as a military training ground since the 19th century. The wing was at first mainly used for marine operations, such as torpedo and naval mine deployment. In 1947 the wing was reorganized with bomber squadrons. In 1954 the first jet planes entered service at the wing, as a part of the Swedish Air Force's transition to jet aircraft.

In 1973 another transition took place when F 17 received two squadrons with J 35 Draken from the former Östgöta Wing (F 3). From 1976 to 1978, F 17 was a pure "Air-to-air" fighter wing with the two squadrons of J 35 aircraft. In 1978 one of these was replaced with a modern reconnaissance squadron equipped with the then state-of-the-art SF/SH 37 Viggen aircraft. The remaining J 35 Draken squadron was replaced with JA 37 Viggen in 1982.

In 1993 the reconnaissance squadron was moved to the Scania Wing (F 10), and was replaced with a JA 37 squadron from the closed Bråvalla Wing (F 13). Once again F 17 became an air-to-air only wing. F 17 is since 2002 equipped with two squadrons of JAS 39 Gripen, as the old JA 37 Viggen aircraft is phased out.

=== F 17 today ===
Parts of the Swedish helicopter forces are today stationed at F 17 with antisubmarine warfare as their main task. A rescue helicopter is also stationed here. F 17 has detachments on Gotland (F 17 G), on Malmen airport near Linköping (F 17 M) and in Hästveda, an urban area in the Hässleholm Municipality. The wing uses the coat of arms of Blekinge as the emblem.

Current fleet:

- JAS 39 Gripen
- Saab 105 (SK 60)
- Eurocopter Super Puma (HKP 10)
- NHIndustries NH90 (HKP 14)
- AgustaWestland AW109 (HKP 15)

== Heraldry and traditions ==
=== Coat of arms ===
The first coat of arms of the Blekinge Wing was used from 1944 to 1994. Blazon: "Azure, the provincial badge of Blekinge, an oak, the trunk enfiled with three open crowns, all or." The current coat of arms has been used since 1994. Blazon: "Azure, the provincial badge of Blekinge, an oak, the trunk enfiled with three open crowns, a chief over a string, charged with a winged twobladed propeller, all or."

Coat of arms used from 1944 to 1994.

Coat of arms used from 1994.

=== Colours, standards and guidons ===
Blekinge Wing presents one wing colour and one school colour.

==== Wing colour ====
The first colour was presented to the wing at Svea Air Corps (F 8) at Barkarby Airport by His Majesty the King Gustaf V on 17 September 1944. Blazon: "On blue cloth in the centre the badge of the Air Force; a winged two-bladed propeller under a royal crown proper, all in yellow. In the first corner the provincial badge of Blekinge; an oak enfiled with three open crown, all in yellow." Decor through inserting and embroidery.

A new colour was presented to the wing at Kallinge by His Majesty the King Carl XVI Gustaf on 15 April 2004. The colour is drawn by Kristina Holmgård-Åkerberg and embroidered by hand in insertion technique by the company Libraria. Blazon: "On blue cloth in the centre the badge of the Air Force; a winged two-bladed propeller under a royal crown proper. In the first corner the provincial badge of Blekinge; an oak enfiled with three open crowns; in the second corner the town badge of Kalmar; from a waved base a yellow tower embattled issuant between two mullets (a legacy from the former Kalmar Wing, F 12), in the third corner the provincial badge of Scania; an erazed head of a griffin with an open crown (a legacy from the former Scania Wing, F 10) and in the fourth corner an eagle, wings elevated and displayed, on its breast an escutcheon with a sinister-turned eagle (a legacy from the former Swedish Air Force Flying School, F 5). All décor in yellow."

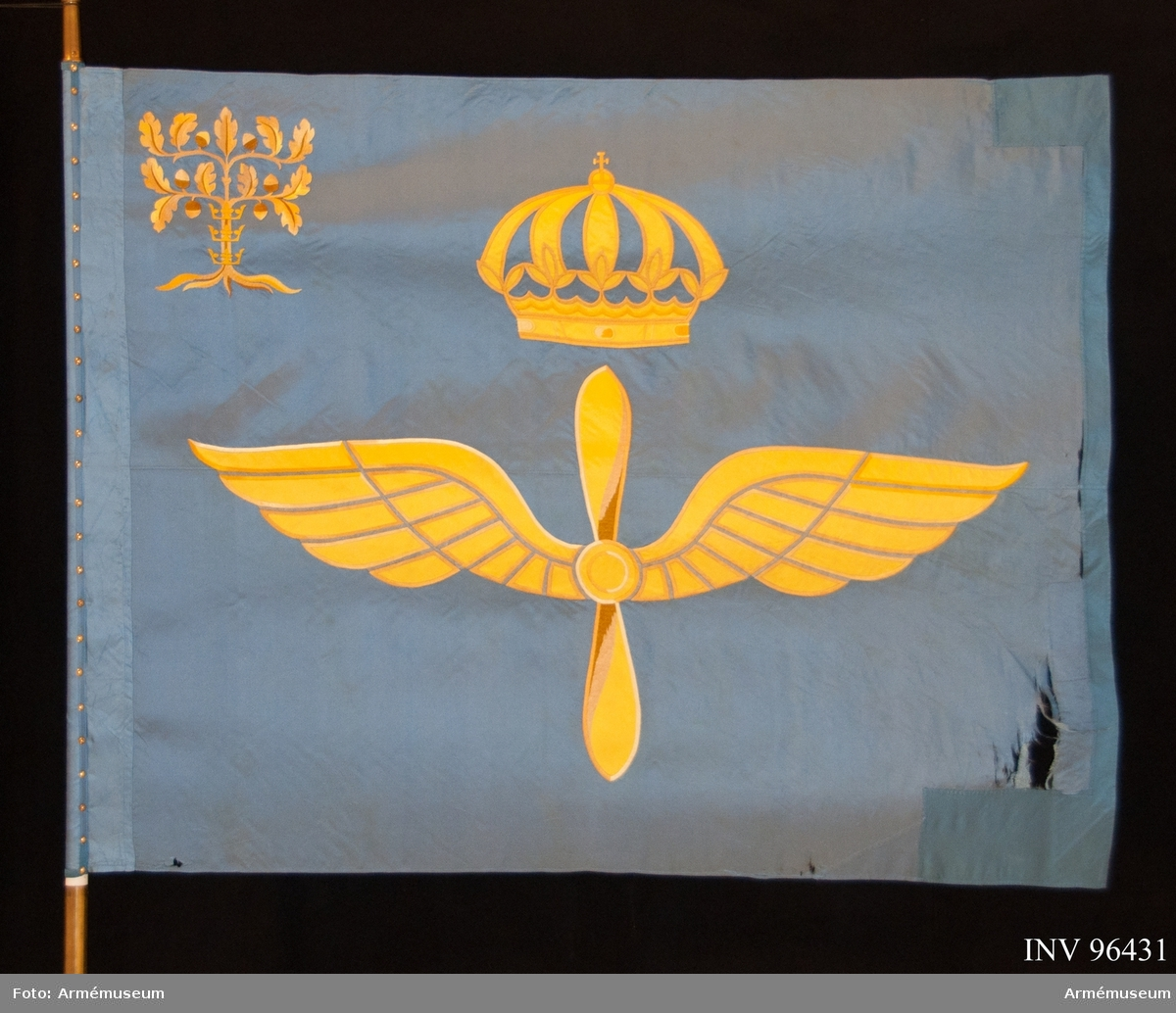
The 1944 colour.

==== School colour ====
The colour was originally presented to the then Swedish Air Force Flying School (F 5) by His Majesty the King Carl XVI Gustaf on 25 August 1996. The colour is drawn by Kristina Åkerberg and embroidered by machine in insertion technique by Engelbrektsson flag factory. The colour was used as school colour at the Scania Wing (F 10) from 1 July 1998 to 31 December 2002 and at the Uppland Wing (F 16) from 1 January 2003 to 31 December 2003. Blazon: "On blue cloth in the centre the badge of the Air Force; a winged two-bladed propeller under a royal crown proper. In the first corner an eagle, wings elevated and displayed, on its breast an escutcheon with a sinister-turned eagle. All décor in yellow."

=== March ===
The march "Torsten Rapp" composed by music director Carl Gustaf Ellström was used from 1946 to 1957. "Blekinge flygflottiljs marsch" composed by music director Åke Dohlin was established on 13 June 1984. The march was commissioned by F 17 in 1984 in connection with the wing's 40th anniversary.

== Commanding officers ==
From 1944 to 1978, the commanding officers was referred to as flottiljchef ("wing commander"), and had during the wings first years the rank of lieutenant colonel. From 1947, the wing commander got the rank of colonel. From 1974 to 1981, the wing commander was referred to as sektorflottiljchef ("sector wing commander"). Unlike sector wing commanders at other wings, the sector wing commander at F 17 was not awarded the rank of senior colonel. From 1 July 1981, the commanding officer is again referred to as flottiljchef ("wing commander"), and had the rank of colonel.

=== Wing and sector wing commanders ===
- 1944–1948: Torsten Rapp
- 1948–1951: Hugo Svenow
- 1951–1963: Sten Rydström
- 1963–1966: Per Svensson
- 1966–1975: Carl-Otto Larsson
- 1975–1984: Erik Spångberg
- 1984–1987: Rolf Clementson
- 1987–1990: Gunnar Ståhl
- 1990–1998: Bo-Walter Eriksson
- 1998–2000: Lennart Pettersson
- 2000–2003: Lars Johansson
- 2003–2007: Lars Lundell
- 2007–2009: Niclas Karlsson
- 2009–2012: Mats Helgesson
- 2012–2013: Gabor Nagy
- 2014–2014: Magnus Liljegren
- 2014–2019: Lars Bergström
- 2019–2022: Tommy Petersson
- 2022–2024: Anders Jönsson
- 2024-2026: Johan Elofsson
- 2026-20xx: Christoffer Gruv

=== Deputy sector wing commanders ===
In order to relieve the sector wing commander, a deputy sector wing commander position was added in 1978. Its task was to lead the unit procurement, a task largely similar to the old wing commander position. Hence he was also referred to as flottiljchef ("wing commander"). The deputy sector wing commander had the rank of colonel. On 30 June 1981, the deputy sector wing commander position was terminated, when the sector responsibility was transferred to the Scania Wing (F 10).

- 1978–1980: Sten Norrmo

== Names, designations and locations ==
Name	Translation	From		To
Wendes flygflottilj	Wendes Wing	xxxx-xx-xx	–	xxxx-xx-xx
Tionde flygflottiljen	10th Wing	1940-10-01	–	1942-06-30
Kungl. Blekinge flygflottilj	Royal Blekinge Wing	1944-07-01	–	1974-12-31
Blekinge flygflottilj	Blekinge Wing; Blekinge Air Group	1975-01-01	–	
Designation		From		To
F 17		1944-07-01	–	1978-??-??
F 17/Se 2		1978-??-??	–	1981-06-30
F 17		1981-07-01	–	
Location		From		To
Kallinge Airport		1944-07-01	–	

== See also ==
- Swedish Air Force
- List of military aircraft of Sweden
