= ESDF =

ESDF may refer to:

- Ronneby Airport, in Sweden, ICAO airport code ESDF
- ESDF keys, a variant of keyboard Arrow keys
