= Malmen Airbase =

Military airbase in Malmslätt, Sweden

Malmen Airbase Malmens flygplats
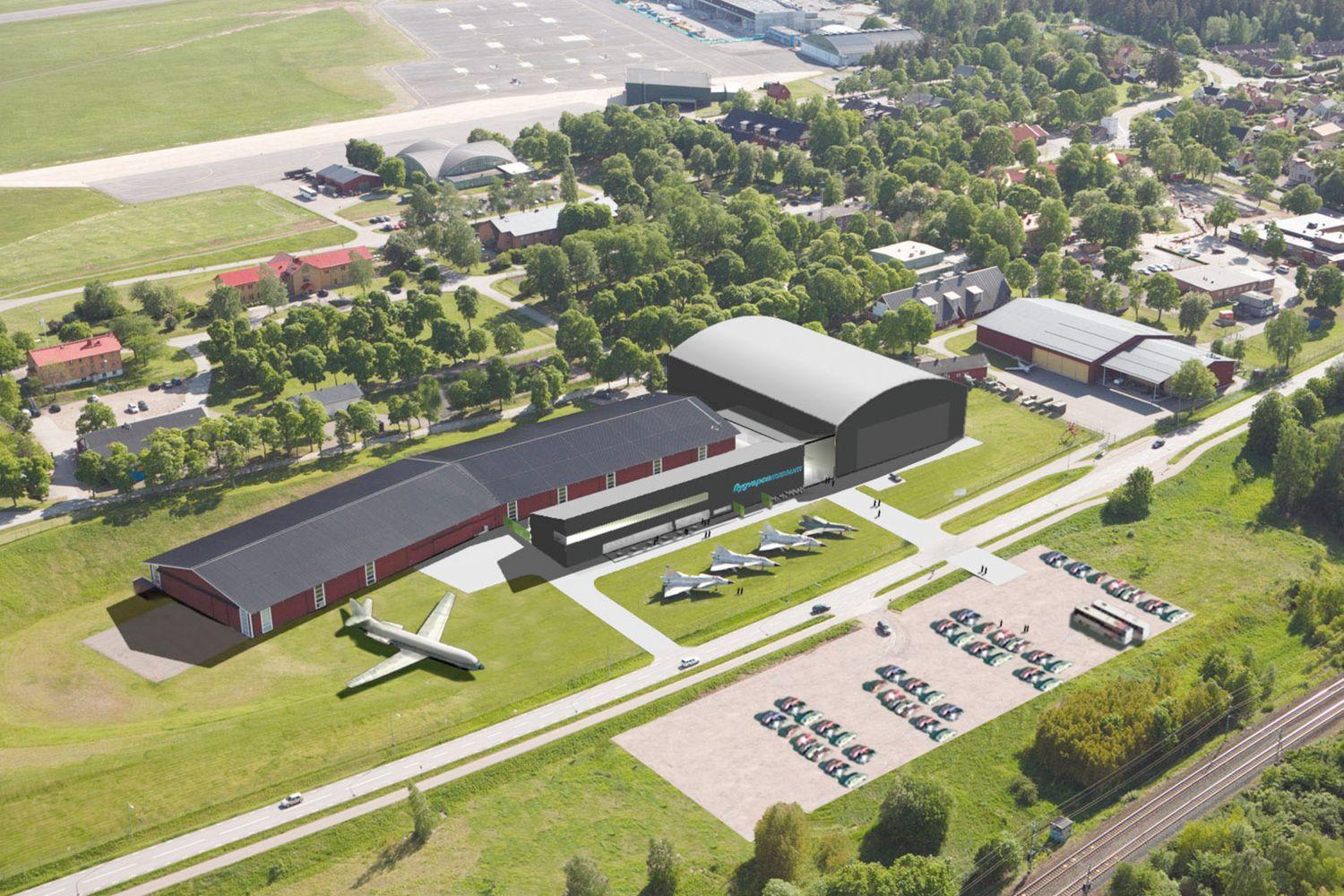
- IATA: QEI; ICAO: ESCF

Summary
- Airport type: Military
- Operator: Swedish Air Force
- Location: Malmslätt / Linköping
- Elevation AMSL: 309 ft / 94 m
- Coordinates: 58°23′52″N 015°31′22″E
- Interactive map of Malmen Airbase

Runways
Direction	Length		Surface
Direction	m	ft	Surface
01/19	2,214	7,264	Asphalt
08/26	1,870	6,135	Asphalt
- Source: AIP Sweden

Malmen Airbase (Swedish: Malmens flygplats) (ICAO: ESCF) is a military airbase located in Malmslätt, Linköping Municipality, Östergötland County, Sweden. It is located 3 nautical miles (5.6 km; 3.5 mi) west of Linköping.

The base was opened by Carl Cederström in 1912. In the beginning the airbase had only three aircraft but more were bought in the same year. From 1926 to 1974 it served as an air force base for the Östgöta Wing (F 3). In 1974 the Wing was decommissioned, and the airbase was put under Bråvalla Wing (F 13) then later Uppland Wing (F 16). From 1998 it served as main base for the Swedish Armed Forces helicopter units, with the Swedish Armed Forces Helicopter Wing.

From 2003 the Royal Swedish Airschool has been located here, to train pilots with Sk 60 jet trainers. The Swedish Air Force Museum is located on the airbase.

== Facilities ==
The airfield resides at an elevation of 308 feet (94 m) above mean sea level. It has two asphalt paved runways: 01/19 is 2,214 by 35 metres (7,264 ft × 115 ft) and 08/26 is 1,870 by 37 metres (6,135 ft × 121 ft).

== See also ==
- Swedish Armed Forces
- Swedish Air Force
- List of military aircraft of Sweden
