= Malmslätt =

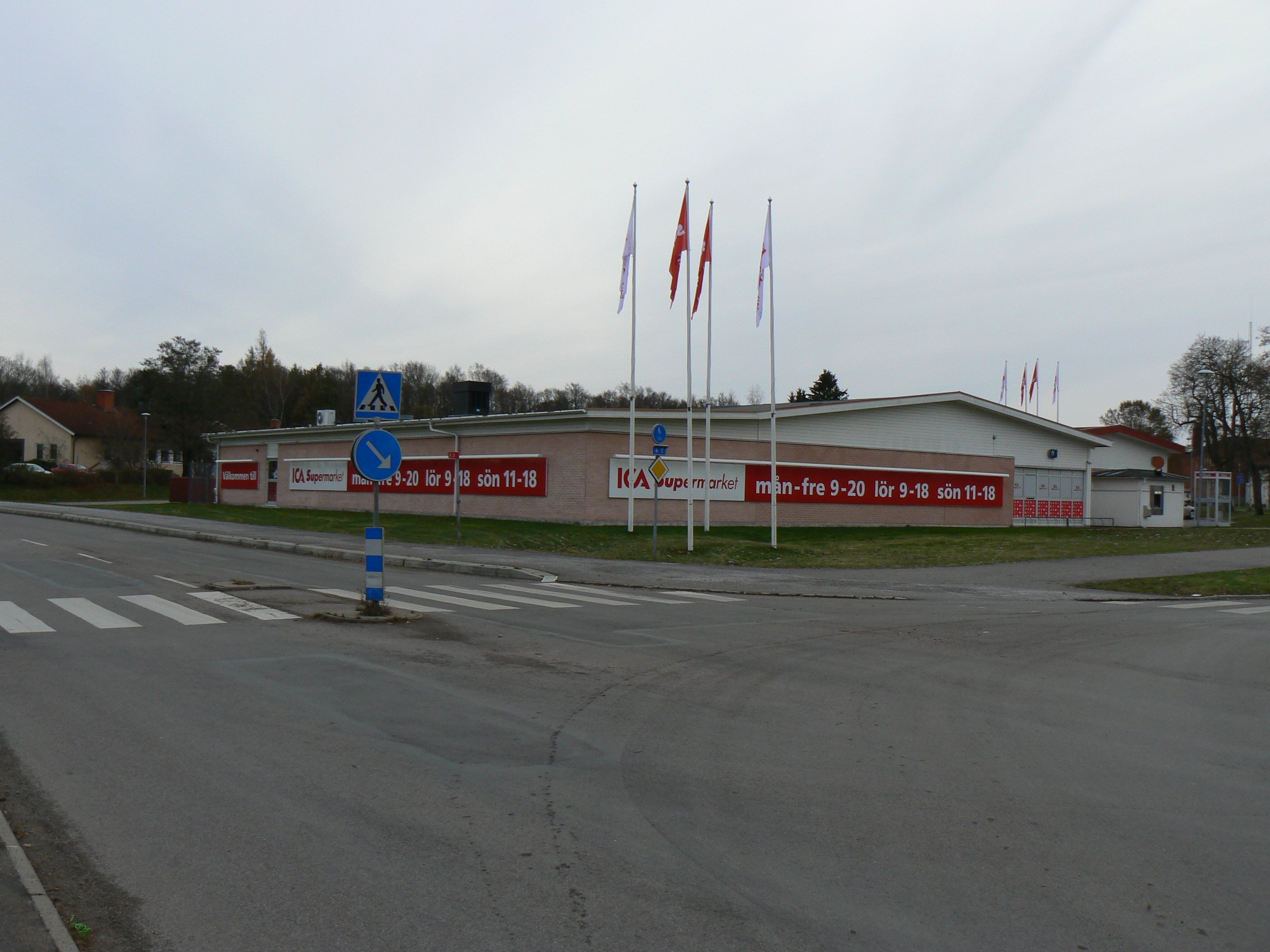
- Central Malmslätt

- Location within Östergötland Location within Sweden
- Coordinates: 58°25′N 15°31′E
- Country: Sweden
- Province: Östergötland
- County: Östergötland County
- Municipality: Linköping Municipality

Area
  - Total: 2.63 km^{2} (1.02 sq mi)

Population (31 December 2020)
  - Total: 4,963
  - Density: 1,890/km^{2} (4,890/sq mi)
- Time zone: UTC+1 (CET)
  - Summer (DST): UTC+2 (CEST)

Malmslätt (Swedish pronunciation: [ˈmǎlmslɛt]) is a locality situated in Linköping Municipality, Östergötland County, Sweden with 5,214 inhabitants in 2010.

Malmen Airbase and the Swedish Air Force Museum is located in the town.

== History ==
The name originates from the military training area Malmen and can be traced back to 1574. Malmen is the definitive form of the word malm, which means gritty ground, and is a common namegiver to towns in Sweden.
