= Ronneby (river) =

River in Sweden

Coordinates: 56.18673°N 15.29515°E

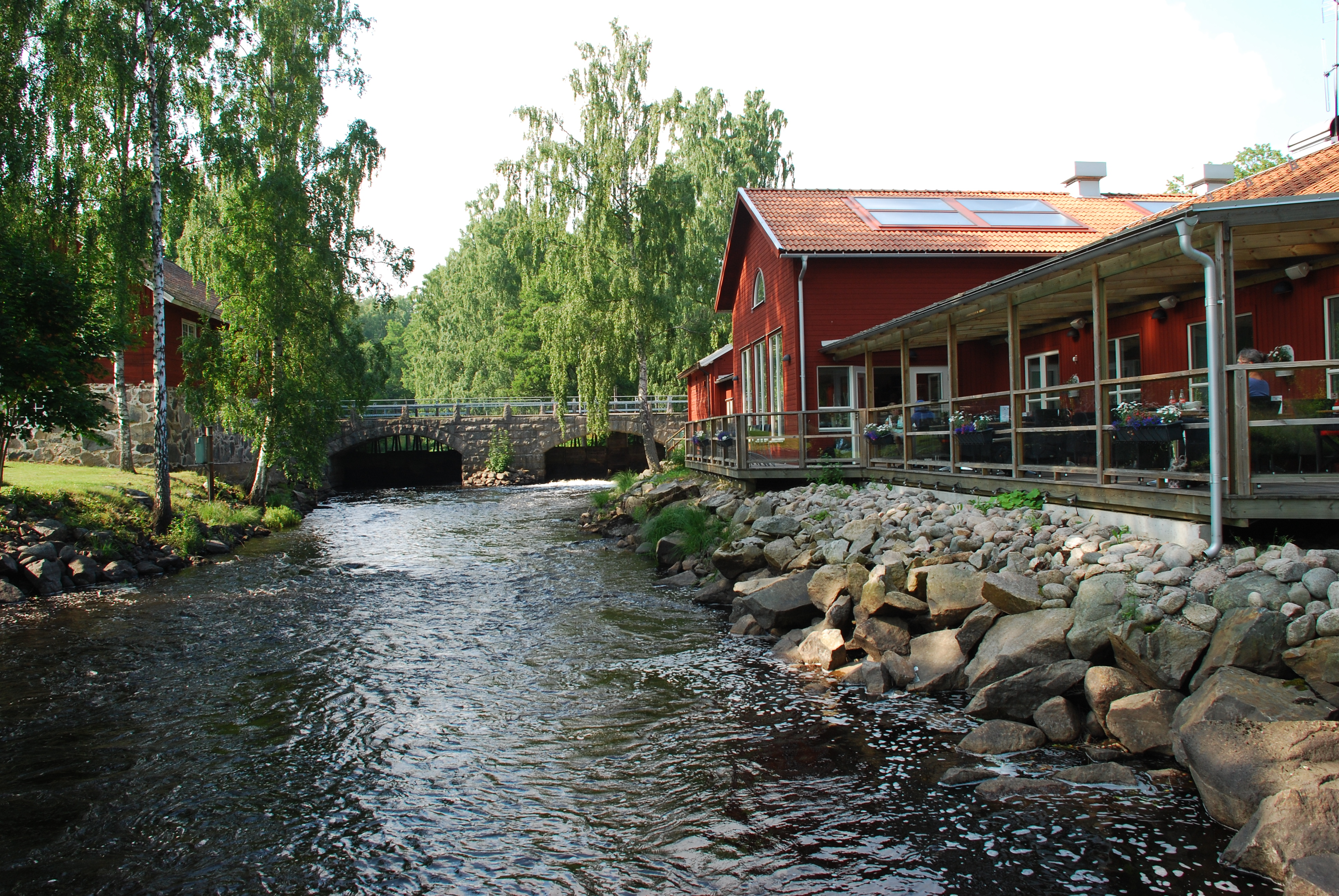
- Native name: Ronnebyån (Swedish)

Location
- Country: Sweden

Physical characteristics
- Length: 110 km (68 mi)
- Basin size: 1,112.7 km^{2} (429.6 sq mi)
- Discharge
  - average: 8 m^{3}/s (280 cu ft/s)

The Ronneby (Swedish: Ronnebyån) is a river in Sweden. The 110-km-long Ronneby drains a basin of approximately 1,112 square kilometers.
