= Ronneby Airport =

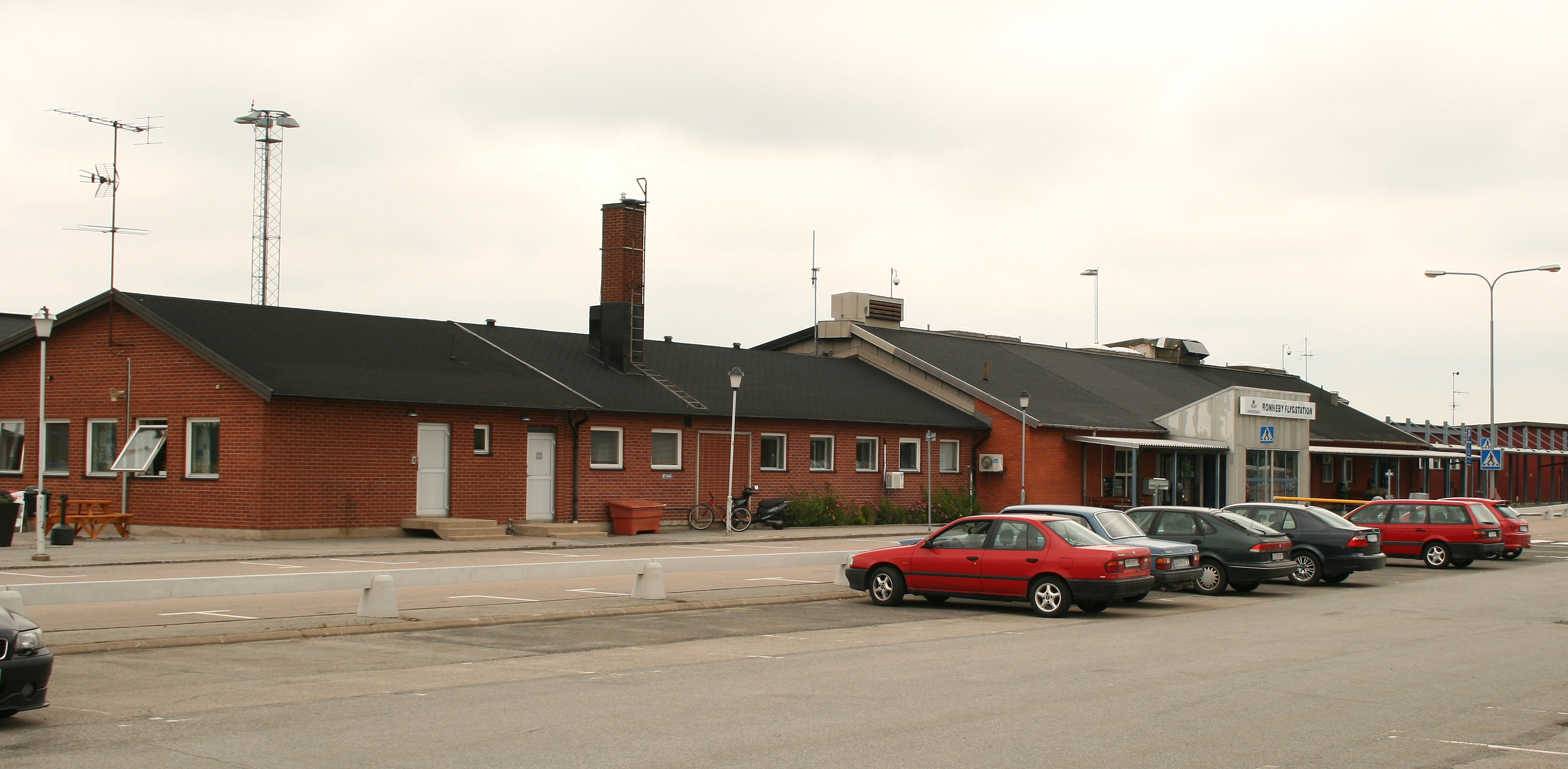
- IATA: RNB; ICAO: ESDF

Summary
- Airport type: Military/Public (Luftfartsverket)
- Operator: Swedavia
- Location: Ronneby, Sweden
- Elevation AMSL: 191 ft / 58 m
- Coordinates: 56°16′00″N 15°15′54″E
- Website: www.swedavia.com/ronneby/

Map
- Location of airport in Blekinge RNB (Sweden)

Runways
Direction	Length		Surface
Direction	ft	m	Surface
01/19	7,648	2,331	Asphalt

Statistics (2016)
- Passengers total: 231,562
- International passengers: 105
- Domestic passengers: 231,457
- Landings total (2011): 2,009
- Statistics: Swedavia

Ronneby Airport (Kallinge) (IATA: RNB, ICAO: ESDF) is located about 4 km (2.5 mi) from Ronneby, Sweden and 30 km (17 mi) from Karlshamn and 30 km (17 mi) from Karlskrona.

Ronneby airport is south Sweden's (Götaland) 6th biggest airport and the 15th biggest airport in Sweden. The airport had 226,995 passengers in 2011.

== Airlines and destinations ==
The following airlines operate regular scheduled and charter flights at Ronneby Airport:

Airlines	Destinations
Scandinavian Airlines	Stockholm–Arlanda

== Statistics ==
Traffic by calendar year
Year	Passenger volume	Change	Domestic	Change	International	Change
2025	97,180	▼4.2%	96,941	▼4.2%	239	▲36.6%
2024	101,408	▼8.3%	101,233	▼8.4%	175	▲63.6%
2023	110,575	▲9.3%	110,468	▲9.3%	107	▼28.7%
2022	101,202	▲137.7%	101,052	▲144.6%	150	▼88.2%
2021	42,580	▼16.2%	41,305	▼18.4%	1,275	▲433.5%
2020	50,835	▼75.2%	50,596	▼75.2%	239	▼37.9%
2019	204,678	▼8.6%	204,293	▼8.8%	385	▲862.5%
2018	223,984	▼5.8%	223,944	▼5.7%	40	▼75.3%
2017	237,695	▲2.6%	237,533	▲2.6%	162	▲60.4%
2016	231,619	▲7.0%	231,518	▲8.3%	101	▼96.4%
2015	216,555	▲0.6%	213,751	▲1.8%	2,804	▼46.4%
2014	215,192	▲0.8%	209,964	▲0.4%	5,228	▲22.7%
2013	213,418	▼2.5%	209,157	▼4.0%	4,261	▲321.5%
2012	218,965		217,954		1,011	

== See also ==
- List of the largest airports in the Nordic countries
