= Ronneby =

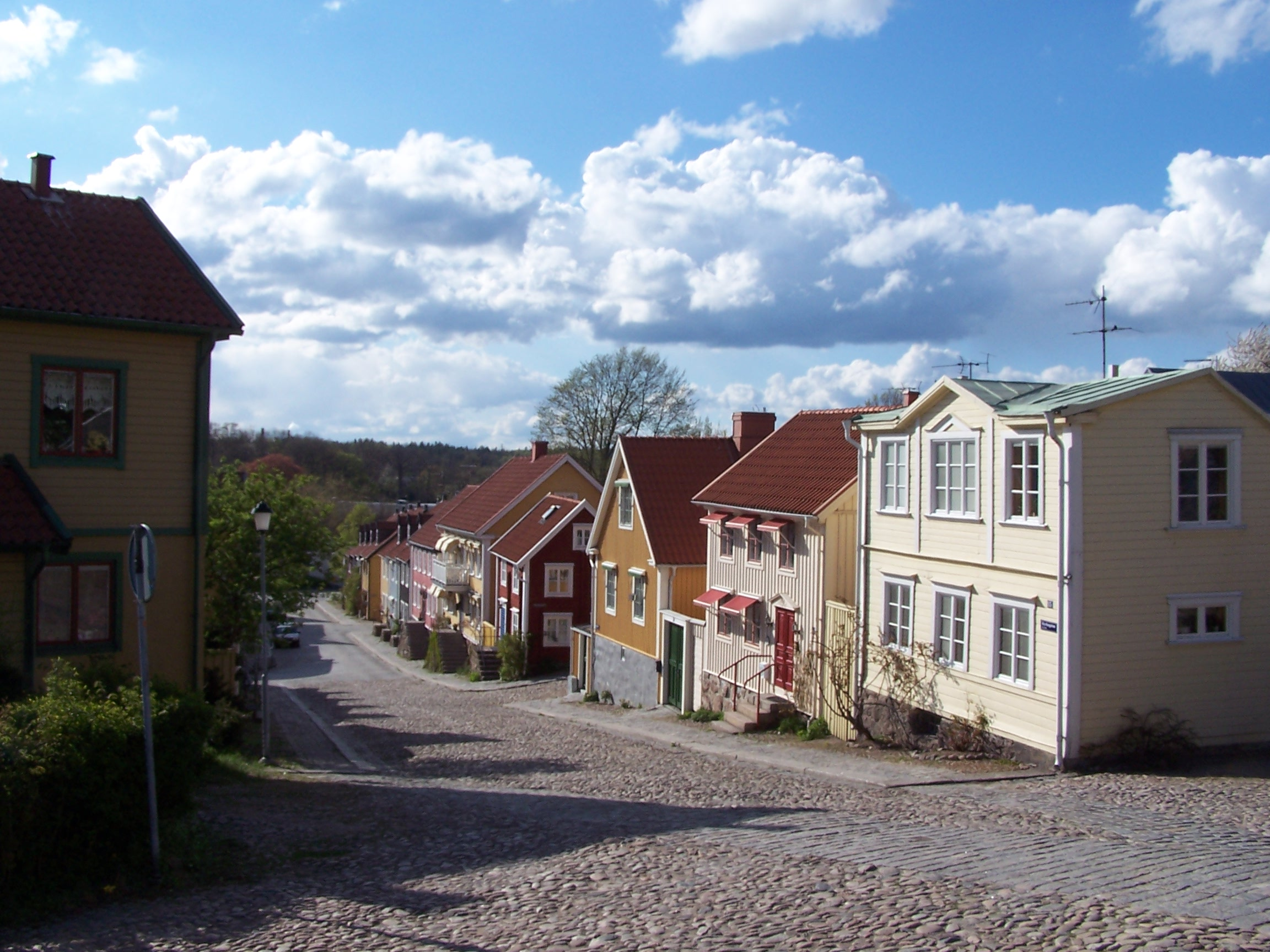
- Bergslagen in Ronneby

- Coat of arms

- Location within Blekinge Location within Sweden
- Coordinates: 56°12′N 15°17′E
- Country: Sweden
- Province: Blekinge
- County: Blekinge County
- Municipality: Ronneby Municipality
- Charter: 1882

Area
  - Total: 7.75 km^{2} (2.99 sq mi)

Population (2023)
  - Total: 12,636
  - Density: 1,552/km^{2} (4,020/sq mi)
- Time zone: UTC+1 (CET)
  - Summer (DST): UTC+2 (CEST)

Ronneby is a locality and the seat of Ronneby Municipality in Blekinge County, Sweden with 12,636 inhabitants in 2023.

Ronneby is regarded as the heart of "the Garden of Sweden", and in 2005 the park "Brunnsparken" in Ronneby was voted Sweden's most beautiful park. 2006 the park was voted Europe's 4th most beautiful park. The church Heliga Kors kyrka was founded in the 12th century, modified and extended until the 15th century, and badly damaged during Northern Seven Years' War in the 16th century.

== History ==
The city's oldest surviving city privileges are from 1387. The first recorded spelling of the name (around the year 1300) is Rotnæby, "the village upon the roaring (river)", so named because of the rapids on the spot. In the Middle Ages, Ronneby was an important trading and shipping town.

In 1564, Ronneby was the location of a bloody battle during the Northern Seven Years' War between the Swedish and the Danish armies during which the Swedes under King Erik XIV besieged the city, killed many inhabitants (Ronneby Bloodbath) and burnt it to the ground. Erik later reported that "The Water was red from blood of the Danes." The number of victims was heavily exaggerated, for different propagandistic reasons, by both sides.

Following the Treaty of Roskilde in 1658, whereby Blekinge and other southern provinces became Swedish, a navy base was built in Karlskrona – east of Ronneby – which accordingly was granted city rights, while revoking the city rights of Ronneby.

But Ronneby did attract some industries in the 18th century. Besides the industry, it also hosted the Ronneby spa, with water believed to have healing qualities. The park around the spa can still be visited. The first source of chalybeate (ferruginous) water was found in May 1705. But the high period of the spa was in the 19th century.

After a fire in 1864, Ronneby was rebuilt according to a check pattern, which is still the model of today. Ronneby finally regained its city title in 1882. From 1971 it is the seat of the larger Ronneby Municipality.

In the 1970s, the local diving club discovered a shipwreck off the coast of Ronneby that was eventually identified by archaeologists as Gribshunden, a 15th-century Danish warship. The shipwreck is significant because it is the best-preserved and perhaps only known wreck of a carvel warship from the late medieval period. In addition, it served as the mobile castle for King Hans during the first decade of his reign, allowing him to project hard and soft power throughout his realm and beyond

In December 2013, it was revealed that Ronneby's municipal water supply was highly contaminated with PFAS, also known as "forever chemicals," with testing showing the highest levels of PFAS ever recorded in municipal drinking water.

== Arms ==
Ronneby did use a coat of arms with the letter R between a star and a crescent at least since 1542. In 1882, the arms were redesigned, with the R substituted with the Ronnebyå River. The same coat of arms is used today by the municipality.

== Images ==
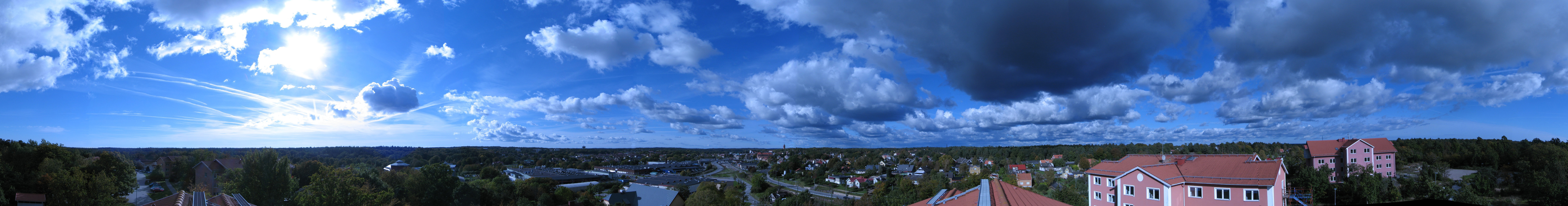
Panorama of Ronneby
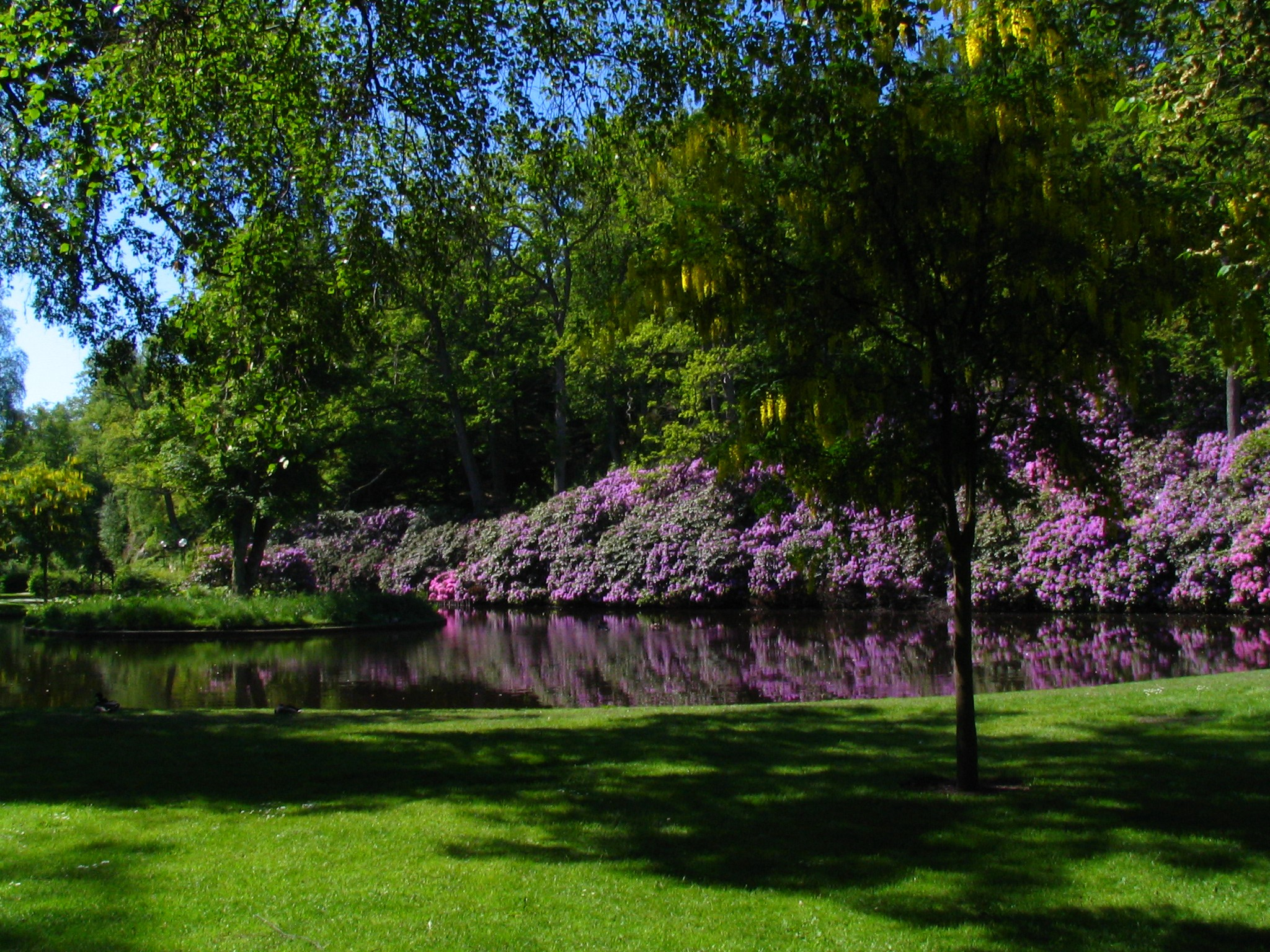
Rhododendron and lake in Brunnspark

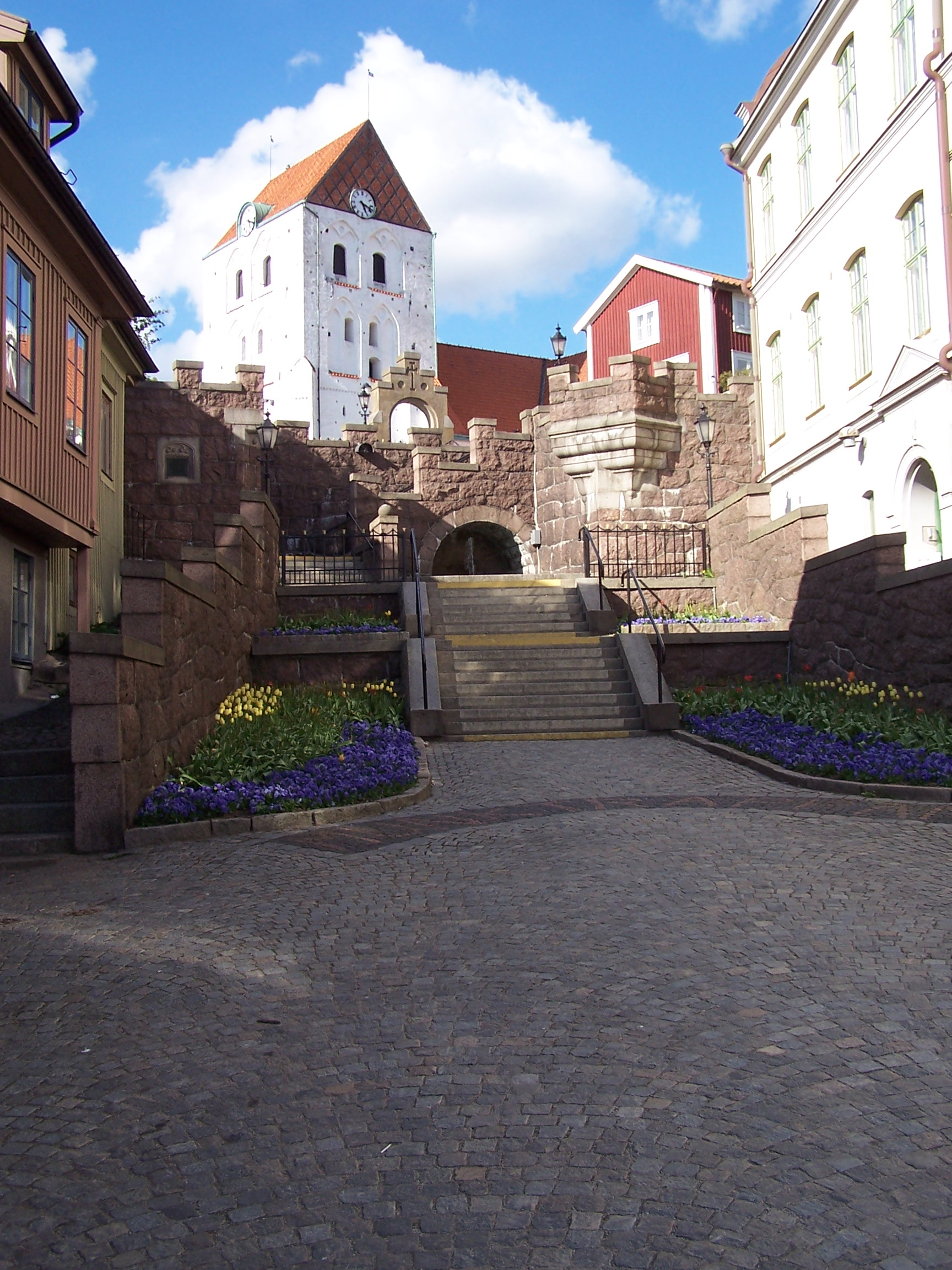
Monks stairs with Heliga Kors kyrka in the background

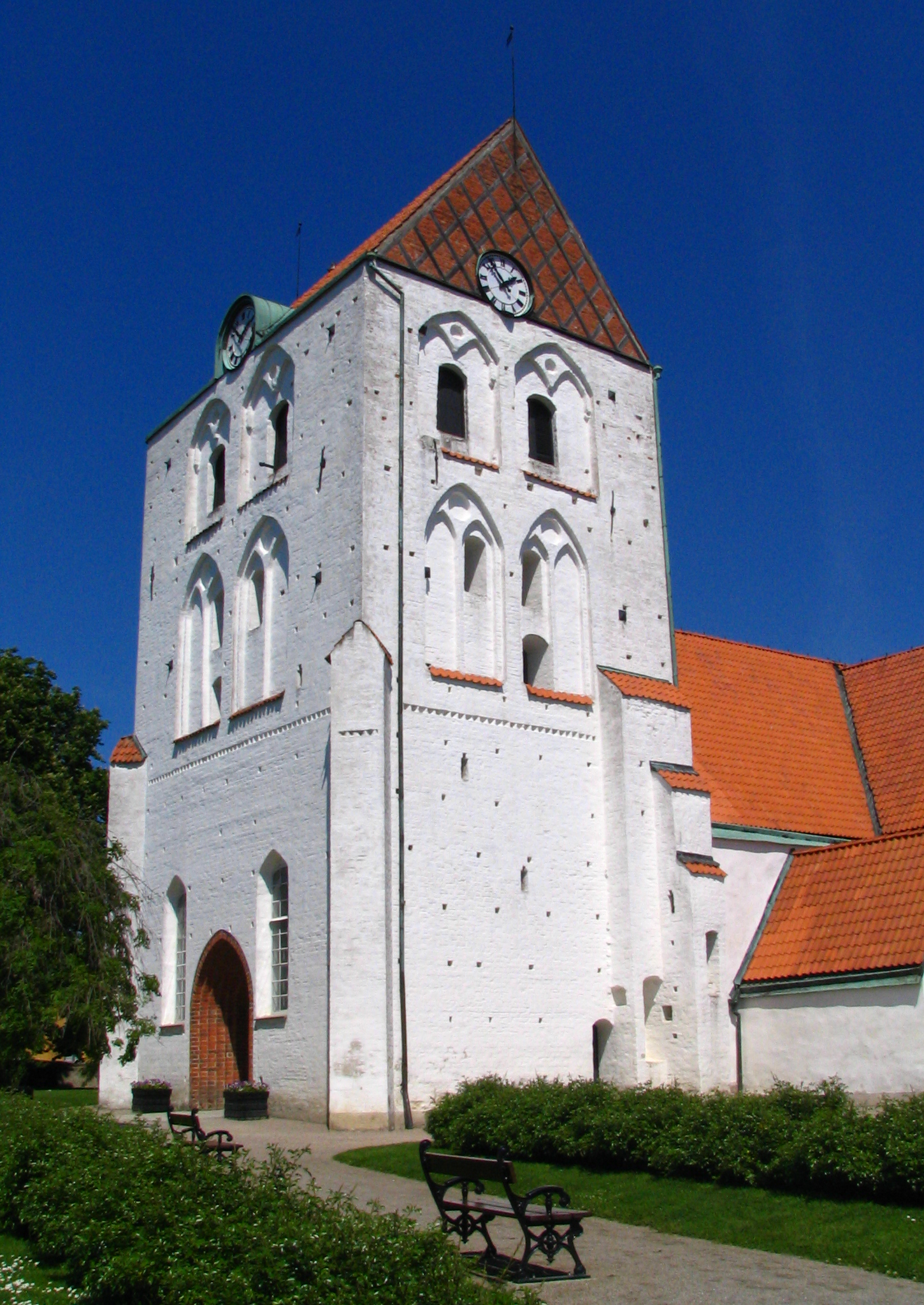
Heliga Kors kyrka

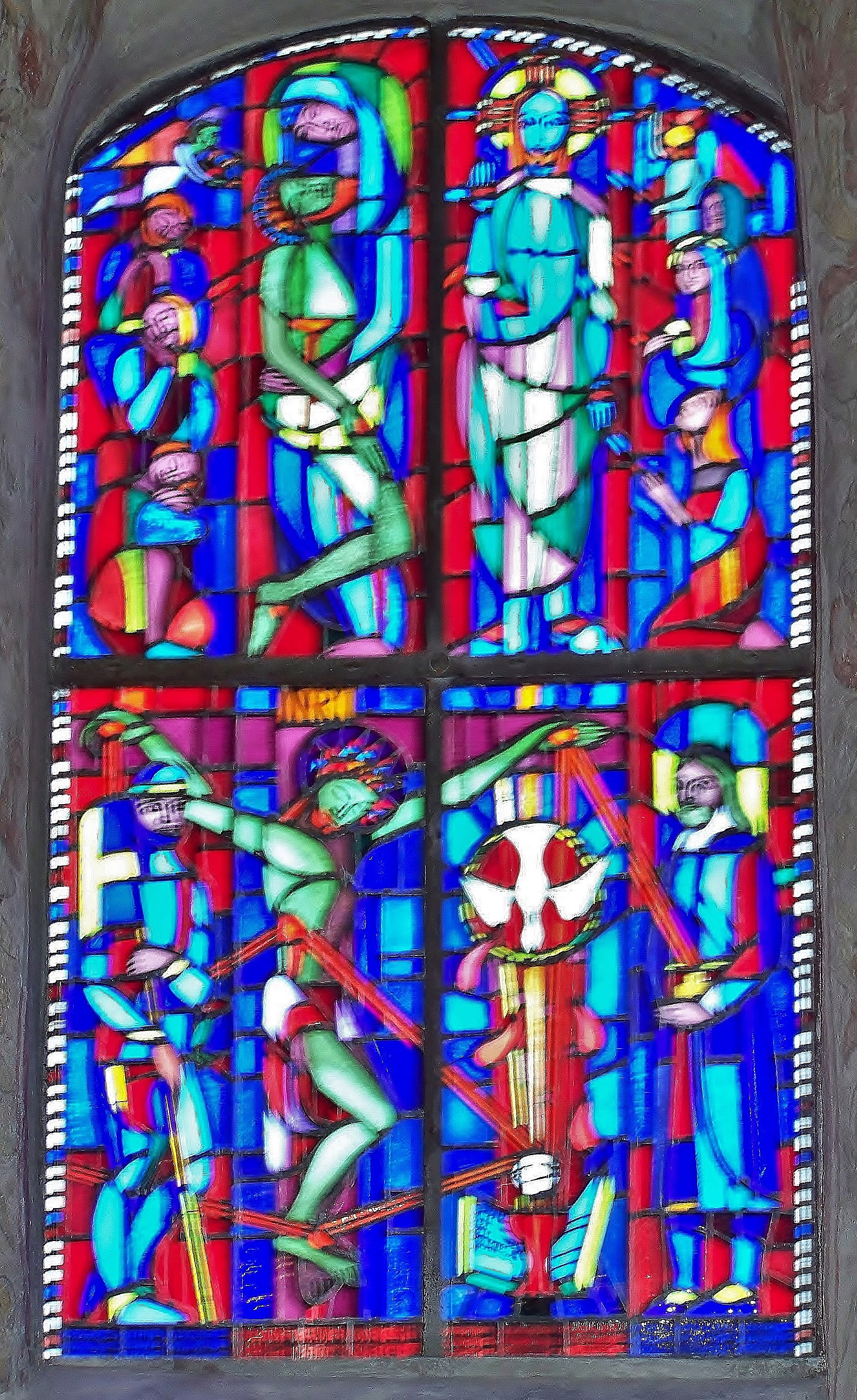
Heliga Kors kyrka, window

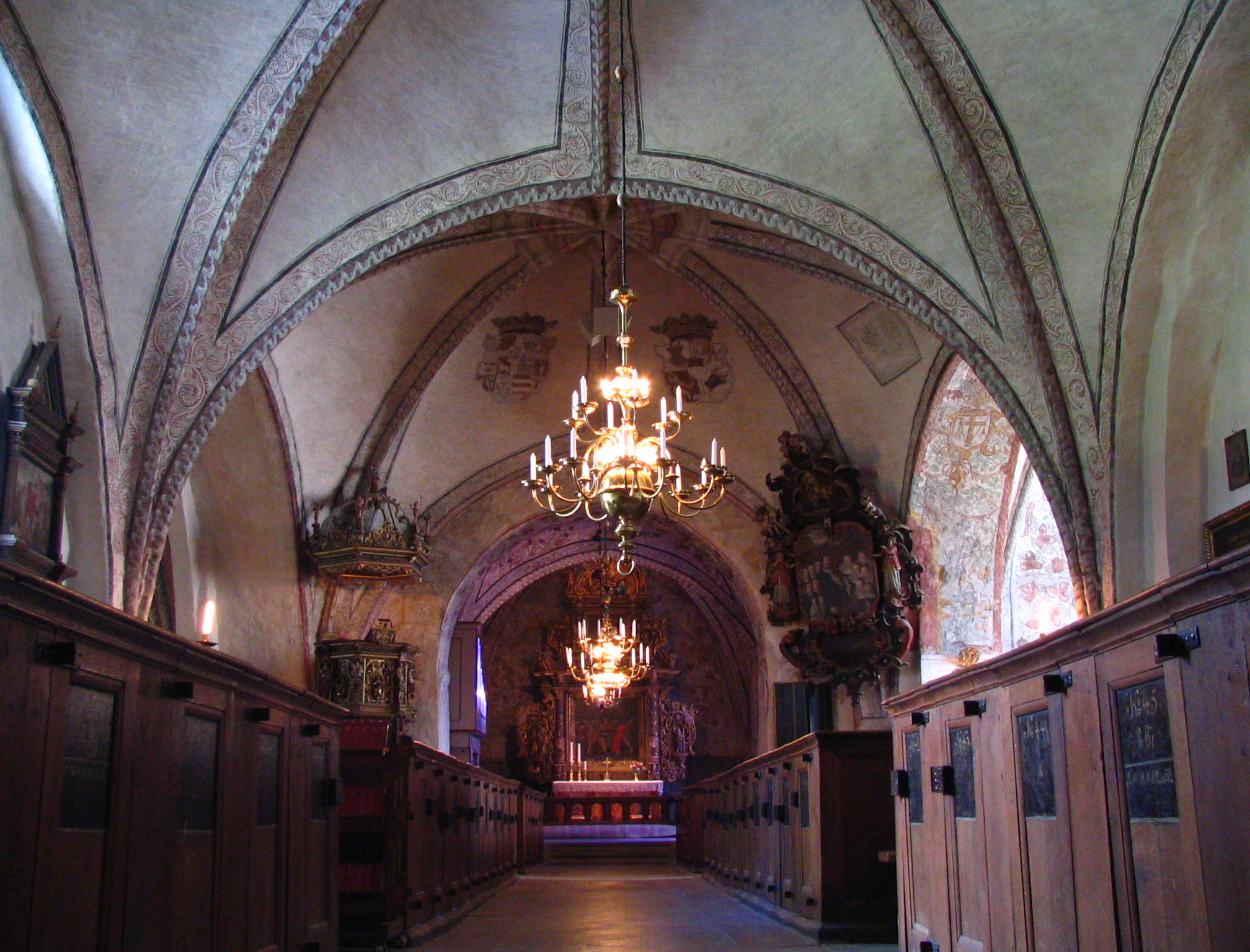
Heliga Kors kyrka, view to chorus

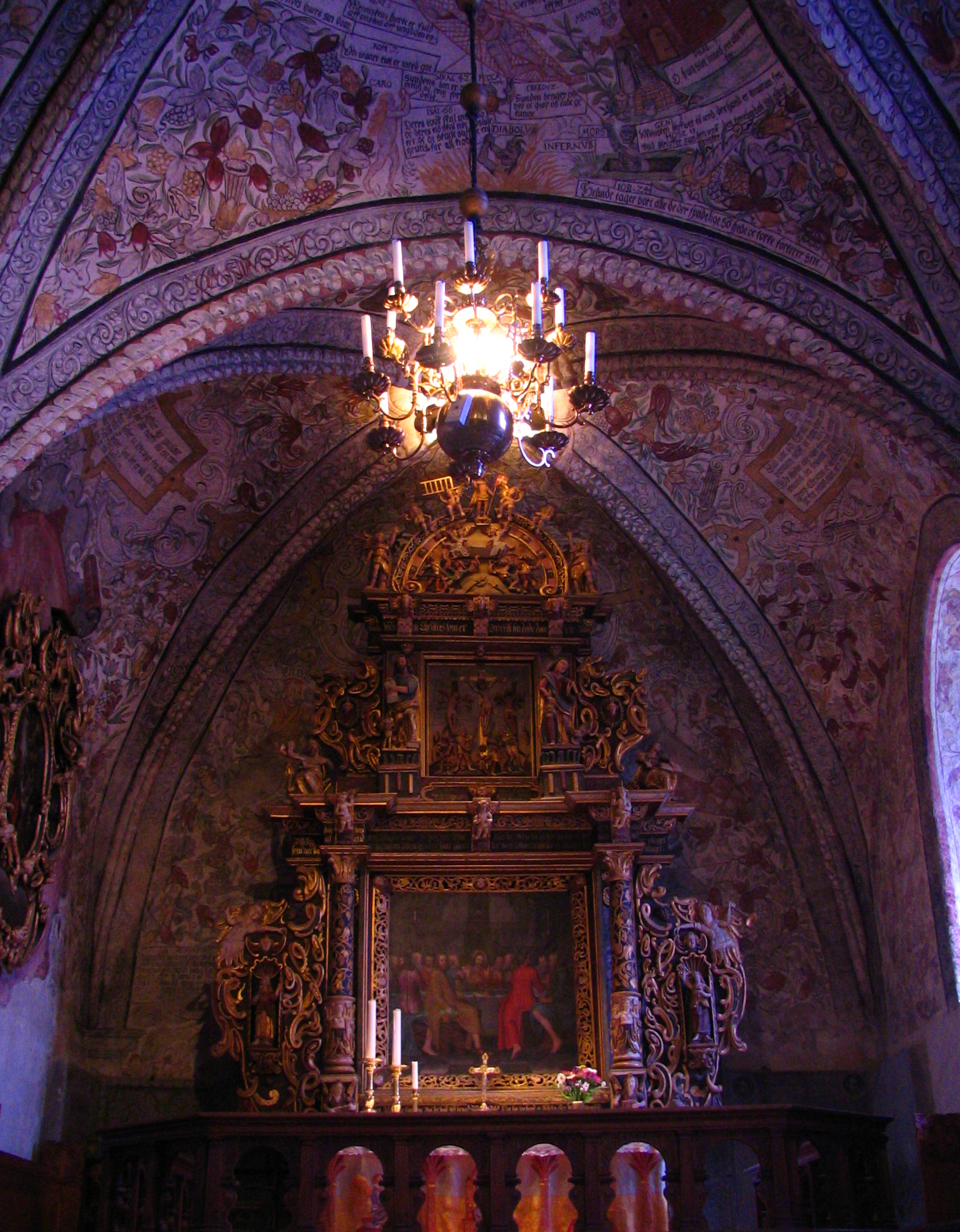
Heliga Kors kyrka, paintings

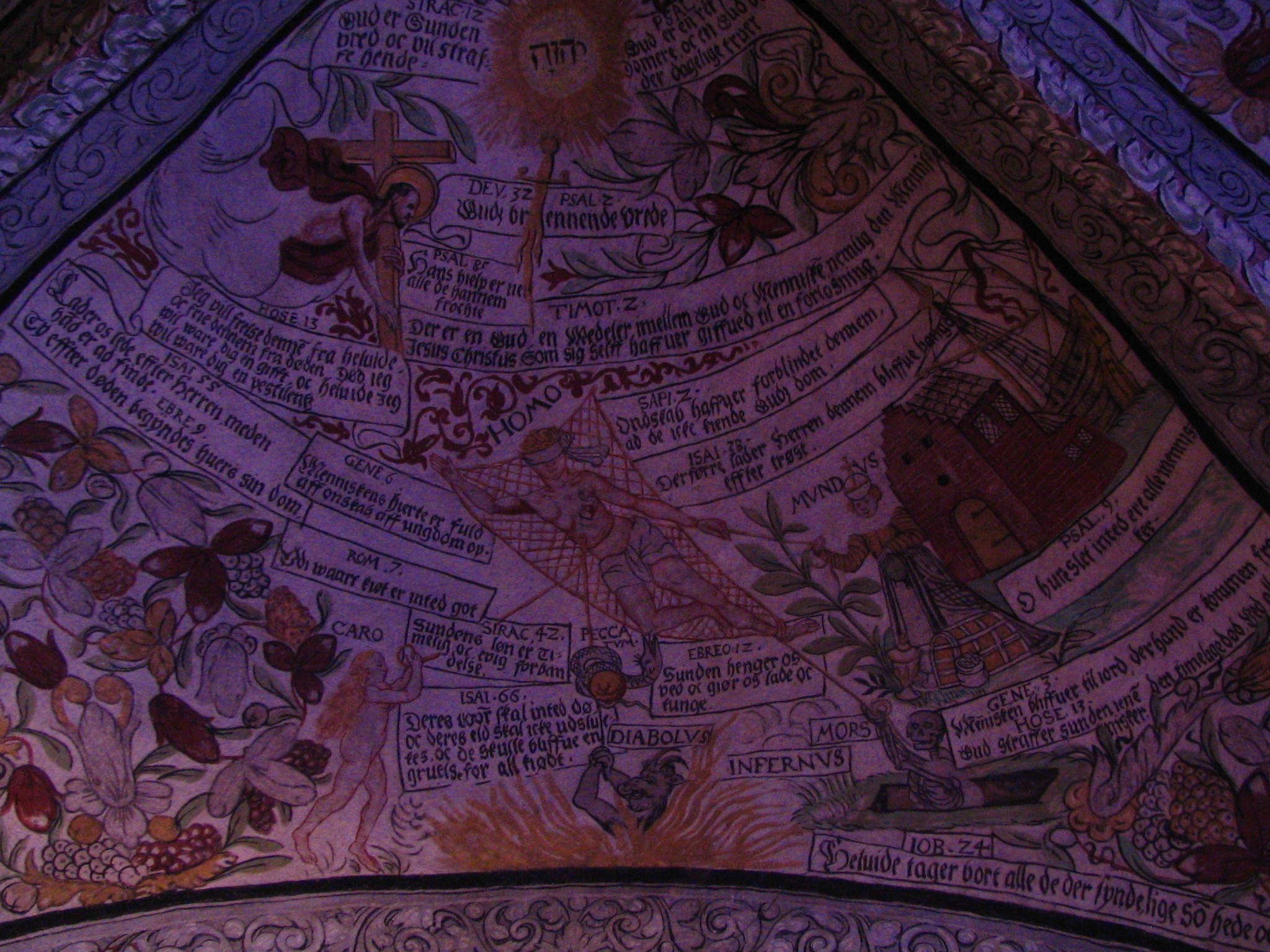
Heliga Kors kyrka, detail of paintings

== Education ==
- Knut Hahn Secondary School, a school aimed primarily at students in their late teens. It was completely renovated in 2004, at a cost of well over 100 million SEK (roughly US$16 million). It is funded and run by the Ronneby Municipality. It features most of the national programmes, teaching arts, science, industrial work and economics among many other subjects. It has about 700 students.
- Blekinge Institute of Technology (moved to Karlskrona in August 2010)

Ronneby also has many schools for lower ages, all run by the municipality save for a secondary school which is run by a company, called Skolalliansen.

== Climate ==
Ronneby has an oceanic climate (Cfb), similar to most of Southern Sweden. The climate is very similar to neighbouring city Karlshamn, but has a somewhat higher rainfall and cooler nights throughout the year at the site located inside the premises of the local airport.

Climate data for Ronneby Airport 2002–2018; extremes since 1946
Month	Jan	Feb	Mar	Apr	May	Jun	Jul	Aug	Sep	Oct	Nov	Dec	Year
Record high °C (°F)	11.5 (52.7)	15.1 (59.2)	19.2 (66.6)	26.6 (79.9)	28.2 (82.8)	32.6 (90.7)	33.3 (91.9)	33.2 (91.8)	27.5 (81.5)	22.2 (72.0)	14.6 (58.3)	12.0 (53.6)	33.3 (91.9)
Mean maximum °C (°F)	7.4 (45.3)	8.3 (46.9)	14.4 (57.9)	19.2 (66.6)	24.8 (76.6)	26.6 (79.9)	28.9 (84.0)	27.5 (81.5)	22.5 (72.5)	17.0 (62.6)	12.0 (53.6)	8.7 (47.7)	30.1 (86.2)
Mean daily maximum °C (°F)	1.9 (35.4)	2.4 (36.3)	6.4 (43.5)	12.2 (54.0)	17.2 (63.0)	20.3 (68.5)	22.9 (73.2)	21.9 (71.4)	17.9 (64.2)	11.7 (53.1)	7.0 (44.6)	3.6 (38.5)	12.1 (53.8)
Daily mean °C (°F)	−0.7 (30.7)	−0.5 (31.1)	2.1 (35.8)	6.5 (43.7)	11.4 (52.5)	14.7 (58.5)	17.5 (63.5)	16.8 (62.2)	13.1 (55.6)	8.0 (46.4)	4.4 (39.9)	1.2 (34.2)	7.9 (46.2)
Mean daily minimum °C (°F)	−3.2 (26.2)	−3.3 (26.1)	−2.2 (28.0)	0.8 (33.4)	5.5 (41.9)	9.0 (48.2)	12.1 (53.8)	11.7 (53.1)	8.3 (46.9)	4.3 (39.7)	1.8 (35.2)	−1.3 (29.7)	3.6 (38.5)
Mean minimum °C (°F)	−14.9 (5.2)	−13.3 (8.1)	−10.7 (12.7)	−5.7 (21.7)	−1.8 (28.8)	2.6 (36.7)	6.4 (43.5)	4.8 (40.6)	0.1 (32.2)	−4.6 (23.7)	−7.1 (19.2)	−11.7 (10.9)	−17.5 (0.5)
Record low °C (°F)	−31.8 (−25.2)	−27.7 (−17.9)	−25.0 (−13.0)	−12.0 (10.4)	−6.0 (21.2)	−2.5 (27.5)	2.0 (35.6)	0.7 (33.3)	−4.6 (23.7)	−11.0 (12.2)	−17.5 (0.5)	−23.4 (−10.1)	−31.8 (−25.2)
Average precipitation mm (inches)	54.6 (2.15)	36.7 (1.44)	33.3 (1.31)	28.9 (1.14)	45.1 (1.78)	60.3 (2.37)	77.9 (3.07)	67.9 (2.67)	48.2 (1.90)	73.1 (2.88)	69.1 (2.72)	57.5 (2.26)	652.6 (25.69)
Source 1: SMHI Open Data
Source 2: SMHI Monthly Data 2002–2018

== Sports ==
These are two of the more prominent sports clubs in Ronneby:

- Ronneby BK, association football
- Fredriksbergs BK, bandy

== Notable residents ==
- Josefina Wettergrund (1830–1903), writer
- Messiah Marcolin, vocalist best known for his work in the Swedish doom metal band Candlemass

== See also ==
- Ronneby, Minnesota
