= Lists of aircraft =

The lists of aircraft are sorted in alphabetical order and is broken down into multiple pages:

== 0–9, A ==
- List of aircraft (0–Ah)
- List of aircraft (Ai–Am)
- List of aircraft (An–Az)

== B ==
- List of aircraft (B–Be)
- List of aircraft (Bf–Bo)
- List of aircraft (Br–Bz)

== C ==
- List of aircraft (C–Cc)
- List of aircraft (Cd–Cn)
- List of aircraft (Co–Cz)

== D ==
- List of aircraft (D–De)
- List of aircraft (Df–Dz)

== E ==
- List of aircraft (E)

== F ==
- List of aircraft (F)

== G ==
- List of aircraft (G–Gn)
- List of aircraft (Go–Gz)

== H ==
- List of aircraft (H–He)
- List of aircraft (Hf–Hz)

== I ==
- List of aircraft (I)

== J ==
- List of aircraft (J)

== K ==
- List of aircraft (K)

== L ==
- List of aircraft (La–Lh)
- List of aircraft (Li–Lz)

== M ==
- List of aircraft (M–Ma)
- List of aircraft (Mb–Mi)
- List of aircraft (Mk–My)

== N ==
- List of aircraft (N)

== O ==
- List of aircraft (O)

== P ==
- List of aircraft (P–Ph)
- List of aircraft (Pi–Pz)

== Q ==
- List of aircraft (Q)

== R ==
- List of aircraft (R)

== S ==
- List of aircraft (Sa)
- List of aircraft (Sb)
- List of aircraft (Sc)
- List of aircraft (Sd)
- List of aircraft (Se)
- List of aircraft (Sf)
- List of aircraft (Sg)
- List of aircraft (Sh)
- List of aircraft (Si)
- List of aircraft (Sk)
- List of aircraft (Sl)
- List of aircraft (Sm)
- List of aircraft (Sn)
- List of aircraft (So)
- List of aircraft (Sp)
- List of aircraft (Sr)
- List of aircraft (Ss)
- List of aircraft (St)
- List of aircraft (Su)
- List of aircraft (Sv)
- List of aircraft (Sw)
- List of aircraft (Sy)
- List of aircraft (Sz)

== T ==
- List of aircraft (Ta)
- List of aircraft (Tc)
- List of aircraft (Te)
- List of aircraft (Tg)
- List of aircraft (Th)
- List of aircraft (Ti)
- List of aircraft (Tl)
- List of aircraft (Tm)
- List of aircraft (Tn)
- List of aircraft (To)
- List of aircraft (Tr)
- List of aircraft (Ts)
- List of aircraft (Tu)
- List of aircraft (Tw)
- List of aircraft (Ty)

== U ==
- List of aircraft (U)

== V ==
- List of aircraft (V)

== W ==
- List of aircraft (W)

== X ==
- List of aircraft (X)

== Y ==
- List of aircraft (Y)

== Z ==
- List of aircraft (Z)

== See also ==
- List of most-produced aircraft
- List of aircraft type designators
- List of civil aircraft
- List of airliners by maximum takeoff weight
- List of Bushplanes
- List of racing aircraft
- List of regional airliners
- List of STOL aircraft
- List of VTOL aircraft
- List of flying boats and floatplanes
- List of ground effect vehicles
- List of large aircraft
