= List of aircraft (Tl) =

This is a list of aircraft in alphabetical order beginning with 'Tl'.

== Tl ==
=== TL Ultralight ===
(TL Ultralight, Hradec Králové)

- TL Ultralight TL-22 Duo
- TL Ultralight TL-32 Typhoon
- TL Ultralight TL-96 Star
- TL Ultralight TL-132 Condor
- TL Ultralight TL-232 Condor Plus
- TL Ultralight TL-232 Power Condor
- TL Ultralight TL-2000 StingCarbon
- TL Ultralight TL-2000 StingSport
- TL Ultralight TL-2000 Sting S3
- TL Ultralight TL-3000 Sirius
- TL-Ultralight Stream
