= List of aircraft (Sl) =

This is a list of aircraft in alphabetical order beginning with 'Sl'.

== Sl ==
=== Sleiters ===
- Sleiters IS-1

=== Slepcev ===
(Storch Aircraft Serbia/Nestor Slepcev)

- Slepcev Storch
- Slepcev Storch Microlight
- Slepcev Super Storch
- Slepcev Storch Moose

=== Slick ===
- Slick 360

=== Sling Aircraft ===
- Sling Aircraft Sling 2
- Sling Aircraft Sling 4
- Sling Aircraft Sling TSi
- Sling Aircraft Sling HW

=== Slingsby ===
(Slingsby Sailplanes/Slingsby Aviation)

- Slingsby T.10 Kirby Kitten
- Slingsby T.11 Kirby Twin
- Slingsby T.40 Hayhow
- Slingsby T.57 Sopwith Camel replica
- Slingsby T.58 Rumpler C.IV replica
- Slingsby T.61 Falke
- Slingsby T.66 Nipper
- Slingsby T.67 Firefly
- Slingsby T-3A Firefly
- Slingsby CT-111 Firefly Canadian Armed Forces
- Slingsby CAMCO V-Liner
- Slingsby-Baynes Bat (not their design, but built by the company)

=== Slinn ===
((James B) Slinn Aeroplane Co, Chillicothe, Illinois, United States)

- Slinn 1911 Monoplane

=== SlipStream ===
- SlipStream Dragonfly
- SlipStream Genesis
- SlipStream Genesis XL
- SlipStream Revelation
- SlipStream Skyblaster
- SlipStream SkyQuest
- SlipStream Scepter
- SlipStream Ultra Sport

=== Sloan ===
(Sloan Aero Corp; Sloan Aircraft Co, Bound Brook, New Jersey, United States)

- Sloan H-1
- Sloan H-2
- Sloan H-3 Trainer

=== Slyusarneko ===
( V.V. Slyusarenko)

- Slyusarneko 1918 monoplane
