= List of aircraft (Sv) =

This is a list of aircraft in alphabetical order beginning with 'Sv'.

== Sv ==
=== SVAM ===
(Shanghai Vantage Airship Manufacture Co.)

- SVAM CA-80

=== SV ===
(SV Aircraft Pty. Ltd.)

- SV-11B Farmate

=== Svenska Aero ===
- Svenska Aero SV-10 Pirat
- Svenska Aero SV-12 Falk
- Svenska Aero SA-10 Pirat
- Svenska Aero SA-11 Jaktfalken – ("Fighter Falcon")
- Svenska Aero SA-12 Skolfalken – ("Trainer Falcon")
- Svenska Aero SA-13 Övningsfalken – ("Advanced Trainer Falcon")
- Svenska Aero SA-14 Jaktfalken I
- Svenska Aero SA-14 Jaktfalken II
- Svenska Aero SA-14E Jaktfalken II
- Svenska Aero SA-15
- Svenska Aero J5
- Svenska Aero J6
- Svenska Aero J6A
- Svenska Aero J6B
- Svenska Aero Ö 7
- Svenska Aero Ö 8
- Svenska Aero Sk 8
- Svenska Aero S 8

=== supplied by Svenska Aero or built under licence ===
- Heinkel HE 1
- Svenska S.I
- Svenska S 2
- Heinkel S.II
- Heinkel S.IIa
- Heinkel J 4
- Heinkel S 2
- Heinkel S 3
- Heinkel S 4
- Heinkel S 5
- Heinkel Sk 4
- Heinkel Sk 5

=== Svenska Flygfabriken ===
(Svenska Flygfabriken / Lage Norberg)

- Svenska Flygfabriken LN-3 Seagull
