= List of aircraft (Sm) =

This is a list of aircraft in alphabetical order beginning with 'Sm'.

== Sm ==
=== S-M-J ===
(M L Shanklin, (--) Moore, (--) Johnson, Indianapolis and Mooresville, IN)

- S-M-J Maverick I

=== SMA ===
(Société Minié Aéronautiques) See:Minié

=== SME Aviation ===
- SME Aero Tiga

=== Smedley ===
(Robert R Smedley, Tulsa, Oklahoma, United States)

- Smedley Rapid Robert

=== Smidley ===
(Henry Smidley, College Park, Maryland, United States)

- Smidley 1910 Monoplane

=== Śmielkiewicz-Gębali-Kurbiel ===
(George Śmielkiewicz, Wiesław Gębali and Adam Kurbiel)

- Śmielkiewicz-Gębali-Kurbiel Akro Viper

=== Smith ===
(A J Smith)

- Smith AJ-2

=== Smith ===
(Alan C. Smith)

- Smith FSRW-1

=== Smith ===
(Arthur L Smith, Ft Wayne IN. 19??: San Francisco, California, United States)

- Smith 1910 Biplane

=== Smith ===
(Cyril B Smith II, Colorado Springs, Colorado, United States)

- Smith Der Kricket

=== Smith ===
(Edward F Smith, 354 W Anderson St, Hackensack, New Jersey, United States)

- Smith S-1
- Smith ES-5

=== Smith ===
(Elmer L. Smith, Eugene, Oregon, United States)

- Smith 1933 Biplane

=== Smith ===
(Everett A Smith, Missoula, Montana, United States)

- Smith S-1

=== Smith ===
(F.P. Smith)

- Smith 1911 Monoplane

=== Smith ===
(Floyd Smith, San Diego, California, United States)

- Smith 1912 Biplane

=== Smith ===
(Frank W Smith, Fullerton, California c.1980: Norco, California, United States)

- Smith DSA-1 Miniplane
- Smith Miniplane +1 two-seat version by Donald Smith
- Sky Classic Miniplane 2000 – updated version by Sky Classic Aircraft

=== Smith ===
(Glen A Smith, Mason City, Iowa and Detroit, Michigan, United States)

- Smith S-2

=== Smith ===
(H.J. Smith, Minneapolis, Minnesota, United States)

- Smith June-Bug Aerial Flivver

=== Smith ===
(J W Smith, Cicero, Illinois, United States)

- Smith 1929 Monoplane

=== Smith ===
(Kyle Smith Aircraft Co, Wheeling, West Virginia, United States)

- Smith 1917 Biplane
- Smith 1918 Biplane
- West Virginia C-3

=== Smith ===
(L.B. Smith Aircraft Corp, Miami, Florida, United States)

- Smith Tempo II

=== Smith ===
(Mike Smith Aero Inc, Johnson City, Kansas, United States)

- Smith Lightning Model 400

=== Smith ===
((Rexford) Rex Smith Aeroplane Co, College Park, Maryland, United States)

- Rex Smith Biplane

=== Smith ===
(Simon Smith, Beloit, Wisconsin, United States)

- Smith 1930 Monoplane
- Smith O (re-engined Acme Sportsman 21)

=== Smith ===
(Smith Airplane Co, Tacoma, Washington, United States)

- Smith S-2

=== Smith ===
(Ted R Smith & Associates, Santa Maria, California, United States)

- Smith Aerostar 320
- Smith Aerostar 600
- Smith Aerostar 600A
- Smith Aerostar 600E
- Smith Aerostar 601
- Smith Aerostar 601B
- Smith Aerostar 601P
- Smith Aerostar 601L
- Smith Aerostar 602P Sequoia
- Smith Aerostar 620
- Smith Superstar 700
- Smith Superstar 700P
- Smith Superstar 702P
- Smith Aerostar 800

=== Smith ===
(Wilbur L Smith, Bloomington, Illinois, United States)

- Smith Termite

=== Smith ===
(Yale Elmer Smith, Eugene, Oregon, United States)

- Smith HS

=== Smith-Cirigliano ===
(Everett M Smith, New Castle, Delaware, United States)

- Smith-Cirigliano Baby Hawk

=== Smith-McCurdy-Lardin ===
(Everett Smith, W A McCurdy, Arthur Lardin, New Castle, Delaware, United States)

- Smith-McCurdy-Lardin AL-1

=== Smokovitz ===
(Anthony Smokowitz, Vulcan, Michigan, United States)

- Smokowitz 1933 Biplane (modified Gere Sport)

=== Smolin ===
(A. Smolin)

- Smolin KSM-1

=== Smyth ===
(Jerry Smyth, Huntington, Illinois, United States)

- Smyth Sidewinder
