= List of aircraft (Tc) =

This is a list of aircraft in alphabetical order beginning with 'Tc'.

== Tc ==
=== TC's Trikes ===
(Soddy-Daisy, TN)

- TC's Trike
- TC's Trikes Coyote
