= TL Ultralight TL-3000 Sirius =

Ultralight aircraft

TL-3000 Sirius
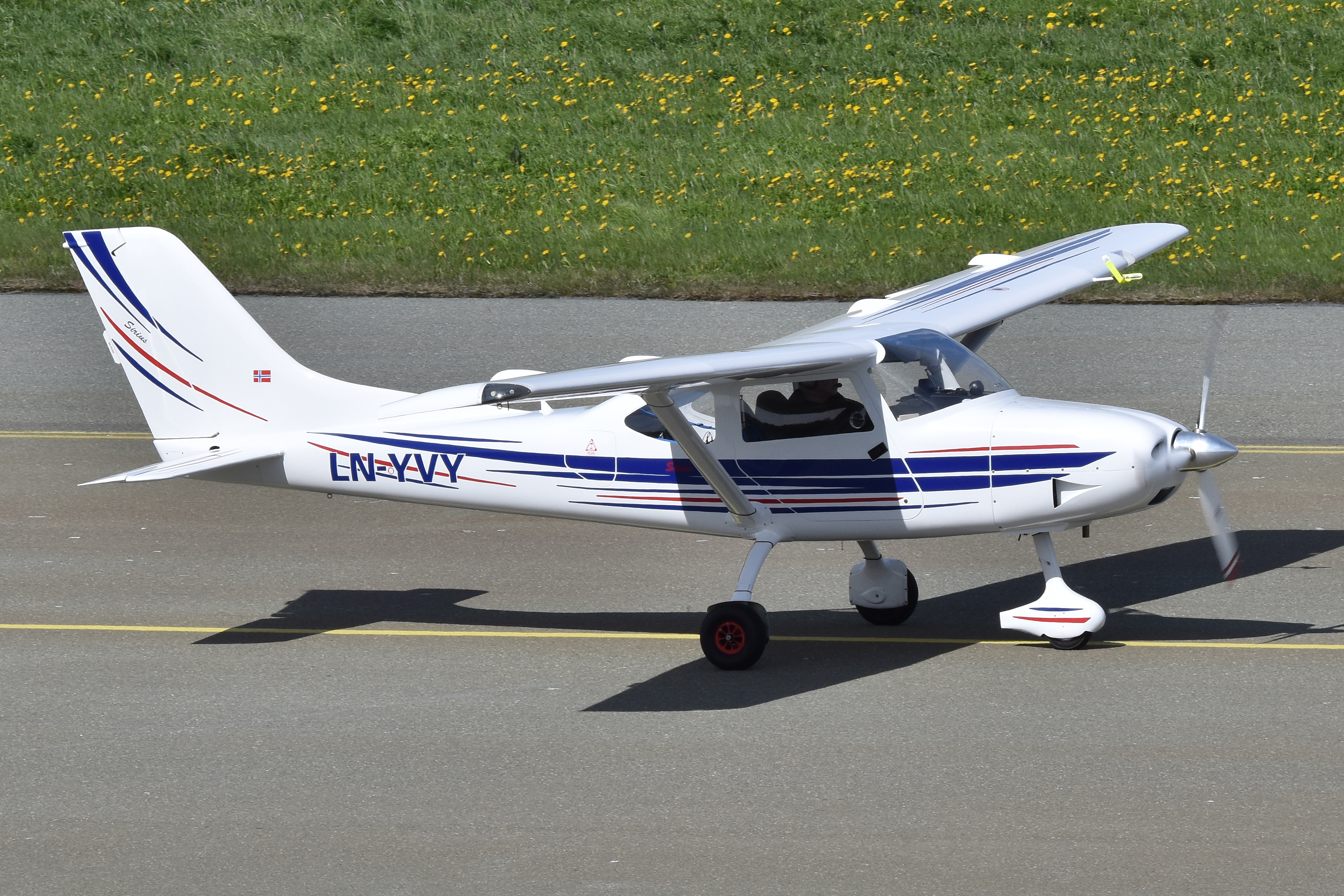

General information
- Type: Two seat ultralight and Light-sport aircraft
- National origin: Czech Republic
- Manufacturer: TL Ultralight, Hradec Králové
- Primary user: private pilot owners
- Number built: 100 by 2015

History
- First flight: 21 May 2008

The TL Ultralight TL-3000 Sirius is a conventional single engine high wing ultralight and light-sport aircraft seating two side-by-side. It was designed and is produced in the Czech Republic.

== Design and development ==
The Sirius programme was announced early in 2007 and an unflown prototype or mock-up appeared at Aero '07 that year. Development continued into 2010 before it was ready for production.

The TL-3000 is a mostly composite aircraft with a carbon fibre wing and glass- and carbon-fibre fuselage. It shares many components with its TL-2000 Sting low wing stablemate. The high wing has a constant chord centre section and tapered outer panels with downturned tips and is braced to the lower fuselage with a pair of forward-leaning lift struts. The fin is swept, with a wide dorsal fillet, and carries a horn-balanced rudder. The tapered, mass-balanced elevators are set at mid-fuselage.

The underwing cabin of the Sirius has a single piece windscreen, glazed side doors, rear side windows and an upper rear transparency. A choice of flat four engines offers either the 59.6 kW (80 hp) Rotax 912UL or the 73.5 kW (98.6 hp) Rotax 912 ULS. The Sirius is fitted with a fixed tricycle undercarriage with mainwheels fuselage mounted on composite cantilever spring legs. The nosewheel is steerable and the mainwheels have brakes; all wheels are almost completely enclosed in spats. The company has also developed a float installation for the TL-3000 to allow water operations.

The Sirus first flew on 21 May 2008 but the prototype was lost in a fatal accident in July.

The design has been accepted by the US Federal Aviation Administration as an approved special light-sport aircraft.

== Operational history ==
The Sirius was designed to fit into both the European ultralight and U.S. LSA categories. Twenty-two aircraft had been sold by September 2010 to customers in Angola, Australia, the Netherlands, New Zealand, Norway and the United States. Only four appeared on the European (Russia excluded) civil aircraft registers in mid-2010, three in the Czech Republic and one in Norway.

== Specifications ==
Data from Jane's All the World's Aircraft 2010/11

General characteristics

- Capacity: 2
- Length: 6.75 m (22 ft 2 in) excluding spinner
- Wingspan: 9.40 m (30 ft 10 in)
- Height: 2.25 m (7 ft 5 in)
- Wing area: 11.15 m^{2} (120.0 sq ft) gross
- Empty weight: 297 kg (655 lb)
- Max takeoff weight: 472.5 kg (1,042 lb) ultralight; LSA 598 kg (1,320 lb)
- Fuel capacity: 130 L (34.3 US gal; 28.6 Imp gal)
- Powerplant: 1 × Rotax 912ULS flat four, 59.6 kW (79.9 hp)
- Propellers: 3-bladed Woodcomp

Performance

- Maximum speed: 225 km/h (140 mph, 121 kn)
- Stall speed: 65 km/h (40 mph, 35 kn) flaps down
- Never exceed speed: 250 km/h (160 mph, 130 kn)
- Range: 1,400 km (870 mi, 760 nmi)
- Rate of climb: 6.0 m/s (1,180 ft/min) maximum, at sea level

== See also ==
Aircraft of comparable role, configuration, and era

- Aeropro Eurofox
- Glasair Merlin LSA
- Ikarus C42
