= List of aircraft (Sy) =

This is a list of aircraft in alphabetical order beginning with 'Sy'.

== Sy ==
=== SyberJet ===
- SyberJet SJ30

=== Sylvander ===
(Victor Sylvander)

- Sylvander Biplane

=== Symphony ===
- Symphony Aircraft SA-160

=== Synairgie ===
(Montauban, France)

- Synairgie Jet Ranger
- Synairgie Sky Ranger

=== Synergy Paramotors ===
(California)

- Synergy Paramotors Synergy

=== Syvrud ===
(Sig Syvrud, Mandan, ND)

- Syvrud 1936 Biplane
