= List of aircraft (Sr) =

This is a list of aircraft in alphabetical order beginning with 'Sr'.

== Sr ==
=== S.R.A.P. ===
(Société pour la Réalisation d'Avions Prototypes)

- S.R.A.P. 2

=== SRAP ===
(Société pour la Réalisation d'Appareils)

- SRAP 2
- SRAP T-7
- SRAP Spifire IX-c
- SRAP Spitfire IX-e

=== SRCM ===
(Société de Recherches et de Constructions Mécaniques)

- SRCM Joigny (SRCM 153 Joigny)
