= Svenska Aero Falken =

Swedish trainer aircraft

Falken
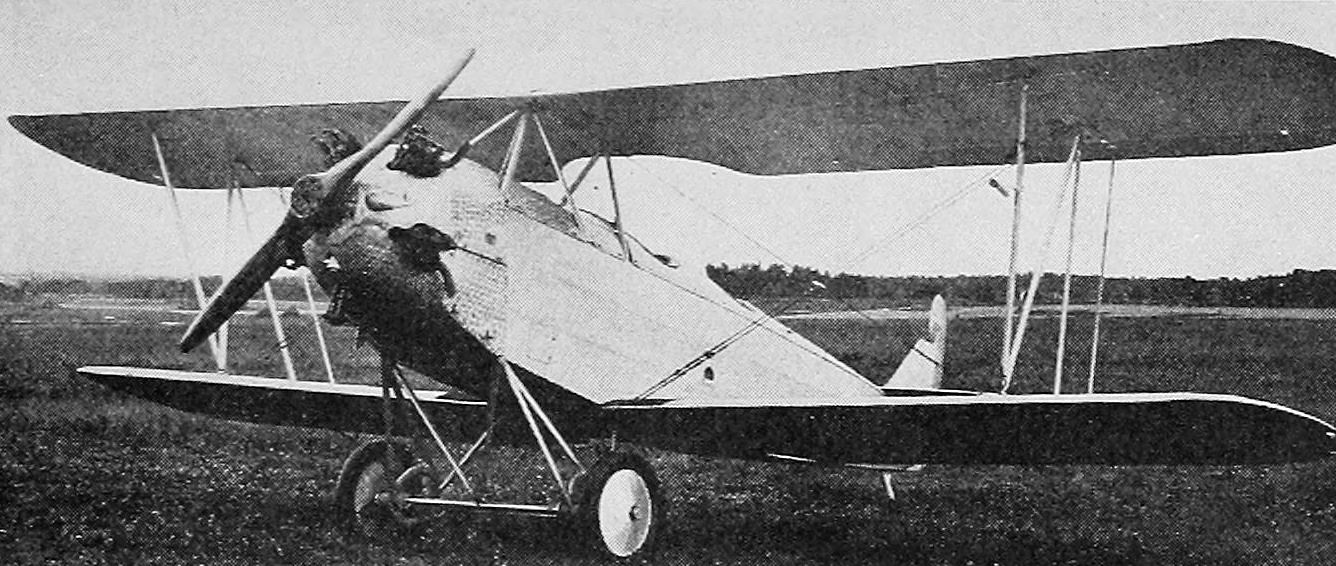
- SA-12 Skolfalken

General information
- Type: Trainer aircraft
- National origin: Sweden
- Manufacturer: Svenska Aero
- Number built: 2

History
- First flight: September 1929

The Svenska Aero Falken was a Swedish trainer aircraft. Two were built, with different engines and were used by the Swedish Air Force.

== Design and development ==
The Falken trainer, closely related to the Jaktfalken fighter, was derived from the earlier Piraten. It was a single bay biplane with unswept, constant chord, thin section wings. Both wings were built around rectangular section steel spars and were fabric covered. They were mounted with light dihedral but with stagger so strong that the forward lower spar was directly below the upper aft one. Because of the stagger and a slightly shorter lower wing the N-form interplane struts leant both forwards and outwards. The upper wing was supported over the fuselage by a cabane formed by a pair of lateral, inverted V-struts to the forward spar and a single, transverse inverted V to the aft spar. There were long, broad ailerons on both upper and lower wings, externally linked by streamlined tubes.

The Falken could be powered by one of two radial engines, either a five-cylinder, 101 kW (135 hp) Armstrong-Siddeley Mongoose or a seven-cylinder 150 kW (200 hp) Armstrong-Siddeley Lynx. The Mongoose-powered version was known as the SA-12 Skolfalken and the Lynx-powered one as the SA-13 Övningsfalken. Behind the engine the fuselage was built around a tube steel structure. It was flat sided and fabric covered, though it had aluminium covered, rounded decking. The Falken's two open tandem cockpits were fitted with dual control; the forward one was under a cut-out in the trailing edge and the other over a similar cut-out in the lower wing.

Its empennage was conventional, with a semi-elliptical tailplane mounted on top of the fuselage and braced from below on each side by a single strut. Its angle of incidence was ground-adjustable. It carried parallel chord elevators with a cut-out for rudder movement. The fin, small and roughly triangular, mounted a straight-edged, upright balanced rudder. Like most of the Falken, these surfaces were formed from steel tubes and fabric covered.

The Falken had conventional, fixed landing gear. The mainwheels were on a single axle, separated by 1.65 m (65 in). The axle ends were mounted via rubber cord shock absorbers to the crosspiece of a frame consisting of three legs from the lower fuselage on each side and stabilised by a V-strut to the crosspiece centre.

The Skolfalken's first flight was in September 1929, though the exact date is not known. The Övningsfalken was flying by early 1930.

== Operational history ==
The first and only SA-12 Skolfalken went to the Swedish Air Force Flight Academy at Ljungbyhed, where it was known by the Air Force basic trainer designation Sk 8. Tests resulted in a new vertical tail, flat-topped and without the earlier prominent balance horn. It remained there for a while and was later moved to Malmö where it ended its 386 hours of flying in 1939 on a May bonfire.

There was also only one SA-13 Övningsfalken; this, known as the Ö 8 (Ö denoted an advanced trainer), was tested in the first half of 1930 but was lost a few months later.

== Variants ==
SA-12 Skolfalken
Mongoose powered. Air Force type Sk 8. One built.
SA-13 Övningsfalken
Lynx powered. Air Force type Ö 8. One built.

== Specifications (Lynx engine) ==
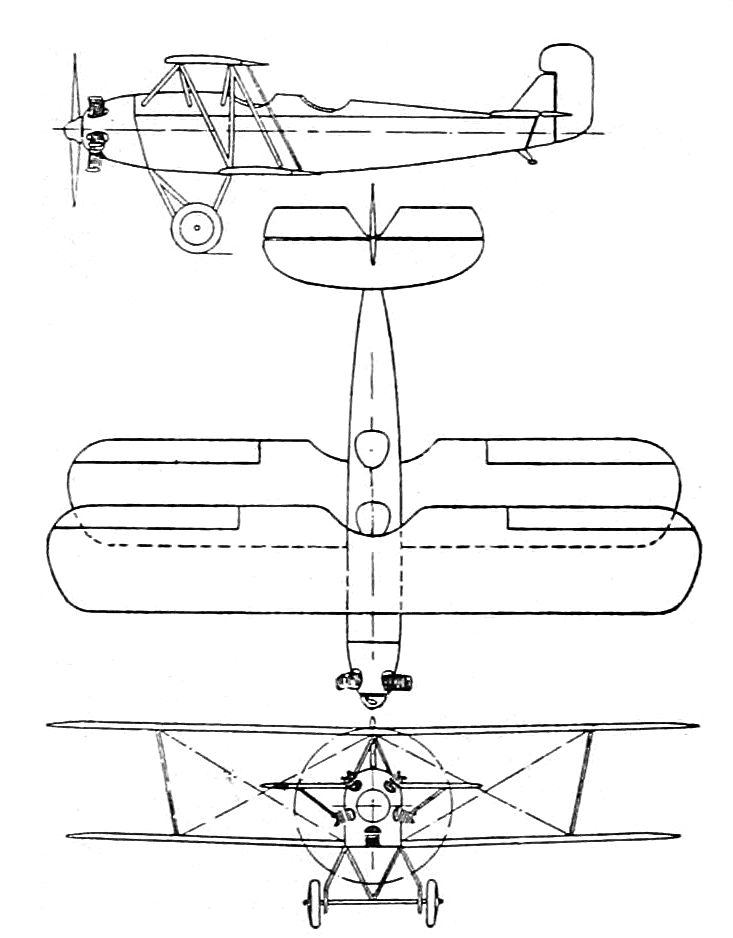
Svenska SA-12 Skolfalken 3-view drawing from Aero Digest April,1930

Data from Les Ailes, December 1929

General characteristics

- Crew: One instructor, one pupil
- Length: 7.60 m (24 ft 11 in)
- Upper wingspan: 9.40 m (30 ft 10 in)
- Height: 3.05 m (10 ft 0 in)
- Wing area: 25.30 m^{2} (272.3 sq ft)
- Empty weight: 700 kg (1,543 lb)
- Gross weight: 1,120 kg (2,469 lb)
- Powerplant: 1 × Armstrong Siddeley Lynx 7-cylinder radial engine radial, 150 kW (200 hp)
- Propellers: 2-bladed

Performance

- Maximum speed: 205 km/h (127 mph, 111 kn) at ground level
- Endurance: 3 h 50 min
- Time to altitude: 4 min to 1,000 m (3,300 ft)
- Landing speed: 78 km/h (48 mph; 42 kn)
