= S-M-J Maverick I =

Maverick I

General information
- Type: Homebuilt aircraft
- National origin: United States
- Manufacturer: S-M-J
- Designer: Shanklin, Moore, Johnson

The S-M-J Maverick I is an American aircraft designed for homebuilt construction.

== Design and development ==
The S-M-J Maverick I is a single-seat, open cockpit, single-engine aircraft with a strut-braced low wing and conventional landing gear. The fuselage is of wood construction and the wing is aluminium.

== Specifications (Maverick I) ==
Data from Air Progress

General characteristics

- Crew: one
- Wingspan: 25 ft (7.6 m)
- Empty weight: 1,075 lb (488 kg)
- Powerplant: 1 × Lycoming O-320 horizontally opposed piston aircraft engine, 150 hp (110 kW)
- Propellers: 2-bladed

Performance

- Maximum speed: 140 kn (160 mph, 260 km/h)
- Cruise speed: 120 kn (140 mph, 230 km/h)

== See also ==
Aircraft of comparable role, configuration, and era

- Stits Playboy
