= TL Ultralight TL-32 Typhoon =

TL-32 Typhoon
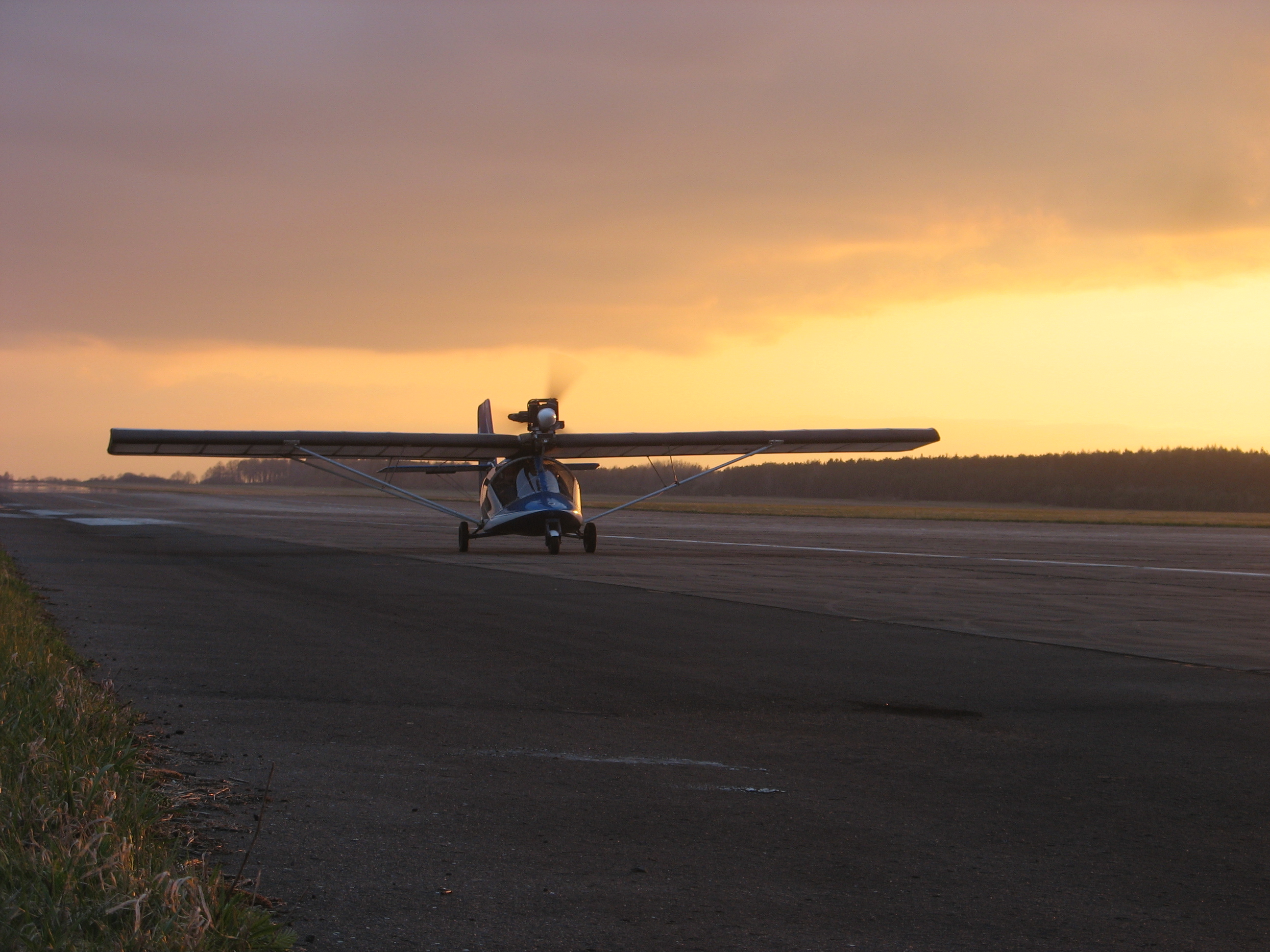
- TL-32 OK-OUR-15

General information
- Type: Two seat ultralight
- National origin: Czech Republic
- Manufacturer: TL Ultralight, Králové
- Number built: More than 200

History
- Introduction date: 1991

The TL Ultralight TL-32 Typhoon is a wing and boom, high wing ultralight with its engine mounted above and ahead of the wing, seating two in side-by-side configuration. It was designed and built in the Czech Republic in the 1990s.

== Design and development ==
The Typhoon has a fabric covered wing which is rectangular in plan and fitted with full span ailerons. The wing is braced to the lowest part of the fuselage with V-form lift struts, aided by jury struts, on each side. From the wings a pair of horizontal tubes, initially parallel and about 1 m (40 in) apart, curve together towards the tail. They are joined there by a second pair which define the lower fuselage and arch upwards to the rear. These tubes are often but not always enclosed. The low aspect ratio tailplane and elevators are mounted at the end of the tubes, as are the fin and rudder surfaces, both of which extend below the horizontal tail; the lower fin is protected by a surrounding tube and the rudder, which has a trim tab, moves in an elevator cut-out.

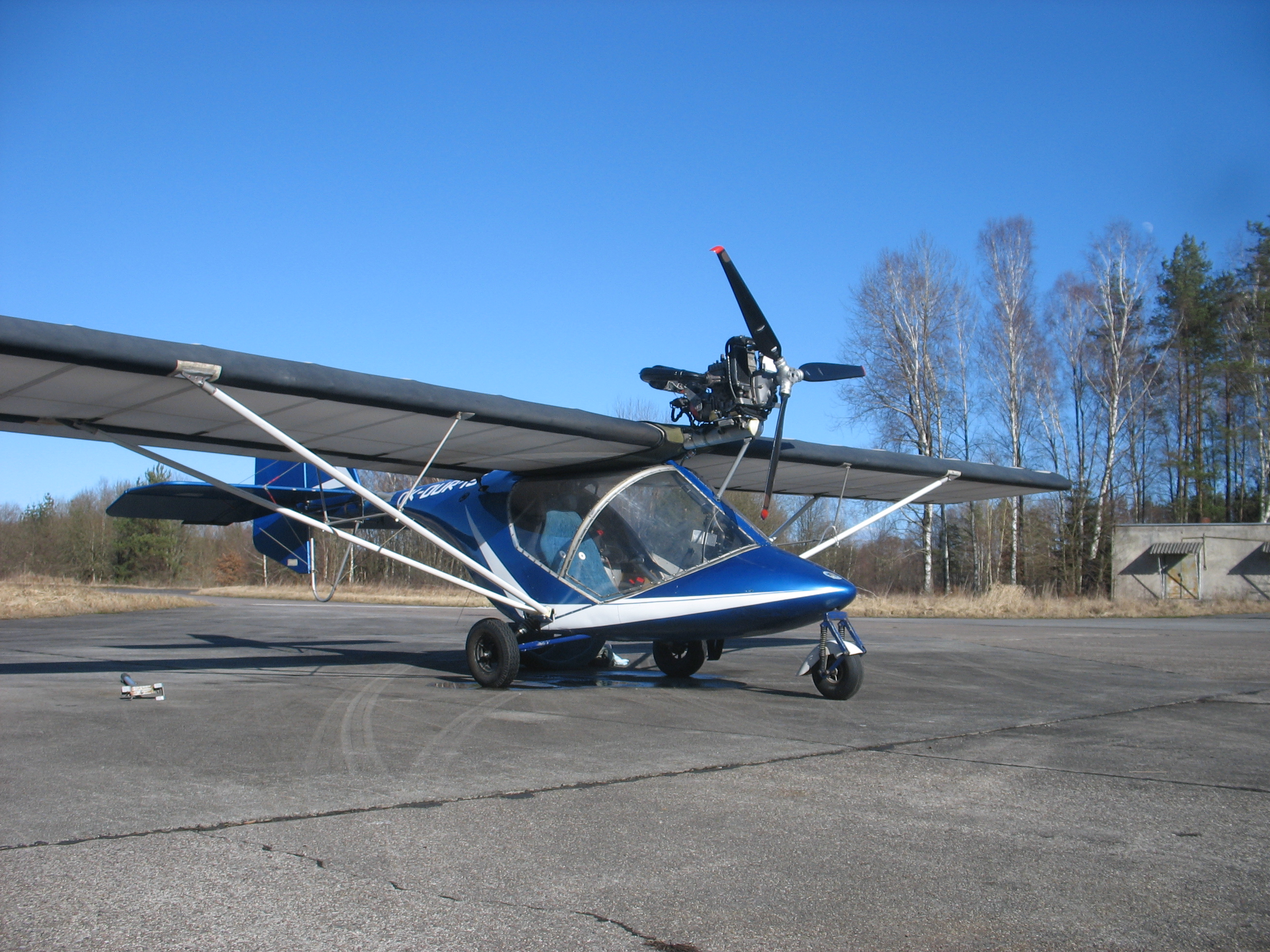
TL-32 Typhoon

The cockpit is beneath the wing, with side-by-side seats, enclosed and with deep glazing. Below it the Typhoon has a short legged, fixed tricycle undercarriage, with small mainwheels enclosed in fairings. The engine, typically a Rotax two-stroke in the 37 kW (50 hp) to 48 kW (64 hp) range like the Rotax 462, 503 or 582, is mounted, uncowled, on the upper side of a horizontal beam from within the wing.

== Operational history ==
The Typhoon went into production in 1991, gaining its Czech certification in 1999. It was still in production in 2000, though in 2011 the company no longer advertises it. Total production was over 200. 55 Typhoons appear on the mid-2010 civil registers of European countries, Russia excluded.

== Specifications ==
Data from Jane's All the World's Aircraft 2000/01

General characteristics

- Capacity: 2
- Length: 5.90 m (19 ft 4 in)
- Wingspan: 10.70 m (35 ft 1 in)
- Height: 2.45 m (8 ft 0 in)
- Wing area: 15.20 m^{2} (163.6 sq ft) gross
- Empty weight: 200 kg (441 lb)
- Max takeoff weight: 400 kg (882 lb)
- Powerplant: 1 × Rotax two cylinder two stroke

Performance

- Maximum speed: 110 km/h (68 mph, 59 kn)
- Cruise speed: 90 km/h (56 mph, 49 kn)
- Stall speed: 45 km/h (28 mph, 24 kn)
- Range: 300 km (190 mi, 160 nmi)
