= List of aircraft (Tm) =

This is a list of aircraft in alphabetical order beginning with 'Tm'.

== Tm ==
=== TM ===
(TM Aircraft (W Terry Miller), Furlong, PA)

- TM-5
- TM-5A
- TM-5B

=== TMM Avia ===
- TMM Avia T-10 Avia-Tor
