= Slick Aircraft Slick 360 =

Slick 360
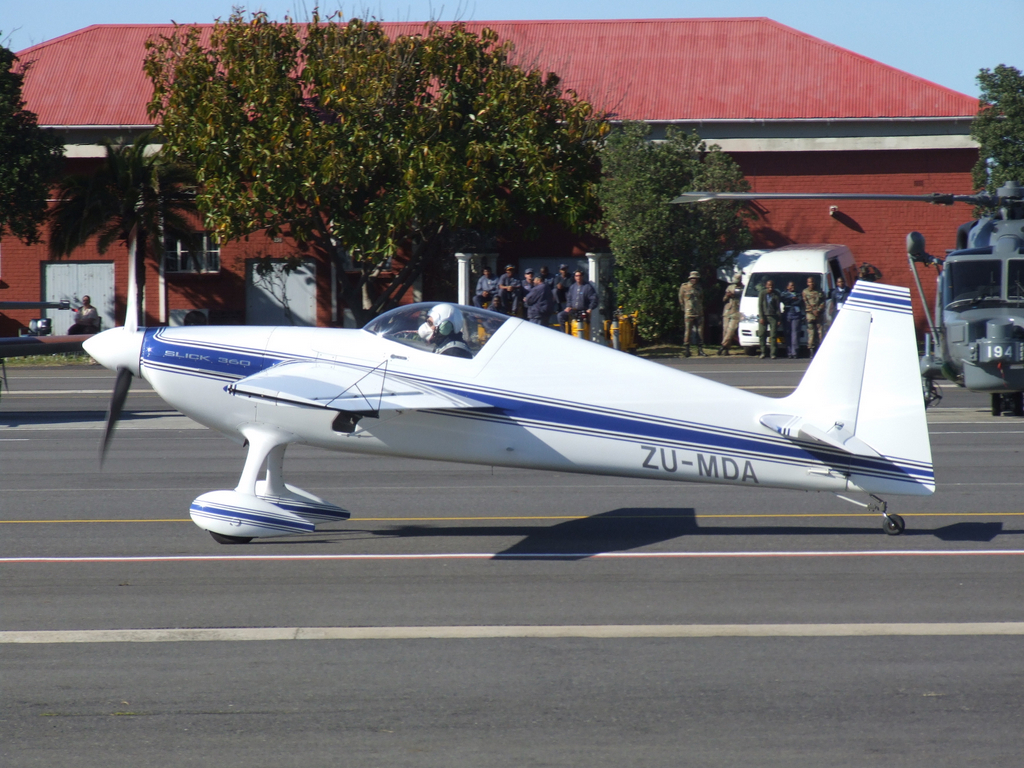

General information
- Type: Aerobatic competition aircraft
- National origin: South Africa
- Manufacturer: Slick Aircraft Company
- Number built: 9

History
- First flight: 7 February 2004

The Slick Aircraft Slick 360 is a South African aerobatics aircraft produced by the Slick Aircraft Company of Pretoria, South Africa. It is designed exclusively as an aerobatic competition aircraft, to compete in events such as the Advanced World Aerobatics Championships (AWAC).

== Development ==
The Slick 360 was designed to fill a gap in the light aerobatic aircraft segment, as the aircraft which dominate this segment, the Yak-55, Zlin Z-50 and Extra 230 have all ceased production, making them increasingly hard to obtain. While other Extras are still in production (260, 300, 300S, 300L and 330), they are fitted with six-cylinder (260/300 hp) engines and therefore not allowed to compete in the AWAC. New aircraft have been created in an attempt to replace these three, such as the One Design and the Cap 222, but they have failed to dominate, purportedly due to their excessively-high aileron roll rates, which, being faster than their flick roll rates, results in the flick roll scores being downgraded. In addition, their small size has made them difficult to judge. The result being that neither of the two new designs has yet managed to achieve better results than the older established designs, with the past five AWAC events being won by the Extra 230, Zlin Z-50 and Yak-55. This was borne out by the winner of 2003 AWAC, who was a French pilot who chose to fly an Extra 230 despite the fact that he had access to the French team's Cap 222.

Due to this, the Slick 360 was envisaged as a newer version of the Extra 230, using the same basic concept and design, but with as many upgrades and improvements as possible. To this end, the size, basic wing shape and control system of the Extra 230 were used as the basis for the new aircraft, but the flick roll characteristics were designed to be closer to that of the Laser, from which the Extra 230 was originally derived.

The aircraft's wings were made from a carbon-fibre composite material, and designed by François Jordaan, an aeronautical and structural engineer who had previously designed the wings of the Celstar aerobatic glider and the Ravin 500. In addition to the improvements made to the wing itself, the latest aileron designs were fitted, giving the aircraft a roll rate of around 400 degrees per second.

The aircraft is fitted with a Lycoming AEIO-360-A1B6 engine from AeroSport Power of Canada, which is a fully aerobatic-qualified engine with only one restriction due to the oil system: The pilot is restricted to 10 seconds of vertical flight or steep dives; inverted flight, steep dive; zero "g" manoeuvres and wing-down or knife-edge flights.

== Operational history ==
The Slick 360 is in production and to date 9 have been sold.

However, the pre-production Slick 360 took part in the South African National Aerobatics Championships in June 2004, achieving the unusual distinction of winning the event in its first outing.

== Specifications ==
General characteristics

- Crew: 1
- Length: 6.83 m (22 ft 5 in)
- Wingspan: 7.30 m (23 ft 11 in)
- Height: 2.16 m (7 ft 1 in)
- Wing area: 8.686 m^{2} (93.50 sq ft)
- Empty weight: 465 kg (1,025 lb)
- Max takeoff weight: 645 kg (1,422 lb)
- Powerplant: 1 × Lycoming AEIO-360-A1B6 air-cooled four-cylinder horizontally-opposed piston engine, 171.5 kW (230.0 hp)

Performance

- Maximum speed: 420 km/h (260 mph, 230 kn)
- Range: 796.6 km (495.0 mi, 430.1 nmi)
- g limits: +10/-10 g (+100/-100 m/s²)
- Power/mass: 0.33 kW/kg (0.20 hp/lb)

== See also ==
Related development

- Extra EA-230

Aircraft of comparable role, configuration, and era

- Yak-55
- Zlín Z-50
