= TL Ultralight Condor =

TL Condor
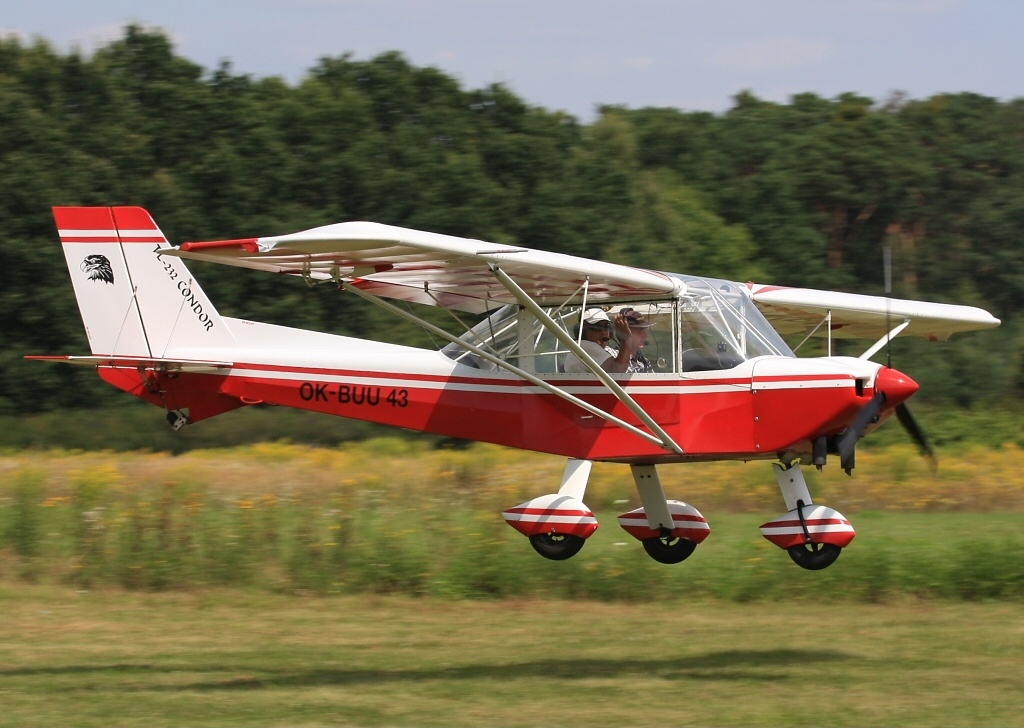
- TL Ultralight TL-232 Condor

General information
- Type: Ultralight
- National origin: Czech Republic
- Manufacturer: TL Ultralight, Hradec Králové
- Status: production ended
- Number built: 115 in September 2010

History
- First flight: 1993
- Developed from: Rans S-6 Coyote II

The TL Ultralight TL-132 Condor and TL-232 Condor Plus are single engine, highwing ultralight aircraft designed and built in the Czech Republic in the mid-1990s. They remain in production in 2010.

== Design and development ==
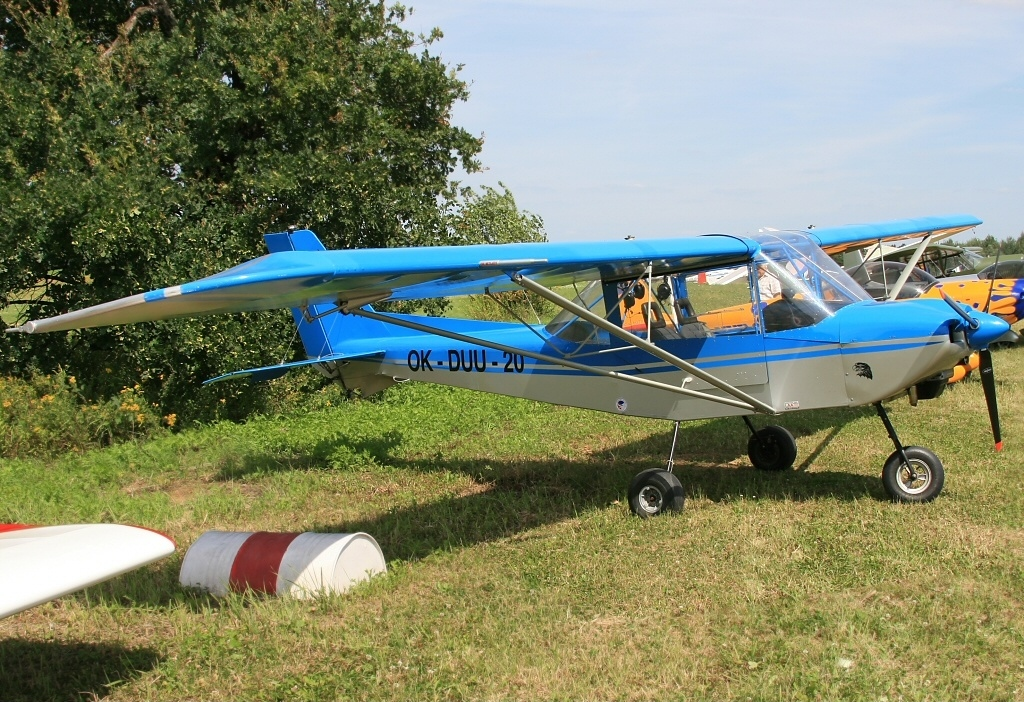
TL Ultralight TL-232 Condor

The Condor and Condor Plus are closely related and similar highwing ultralight aircraft, seating two side-by side with dual control. They are both of conventional layout, the principal differences being the more powerful engine, cut down rear fuselage and extended rear cabin glazing of the Condor Plus. Both have fabric covered metal structures, though the Plus has composite rear fuselage decking.

The wing has constant chord with slightly blunted tips, with flaps filling the trailing edge inboard of the ailerons. The main wing struts are V-shaped and attached to the lower fuselage, assisted by some secondary bracing. Fin and rudder are swept, with a long dorsal fillet. The tailplane is mounted on top of the fuselage and has a swept leading edge. A trim tab on the starboard elevator is flight adjustable only on the Condor Plus. Both types normally have fixed tricycle undercarriages, with mainwheels on cantilever legs. Wheel and leg fairings are an option. A fixed conventional undercarriage with a tailwheel is also available.

The Condor is powered by a 39.5 kW (53 hp) Rotax 503.2 V UL CB. The standard engine of the Condor Plus is the 48.5 kW (65 hp) Rotax 582 UL-DCDI, driving a two blade propeller, but the 59.7 kW (80 hp) Rotax 912 UL-DCDI or the 74.6 kW (100 hp) Rotax 912 ULS, both with three blade airscrews, are options. With the 912 ULS engine, the TL-232 is known as the Power Condor.

The Condor first flew in 1993, the Condor Plus in 1994.

== Operational history ==
By September 2010, 115 examples of the two types had been built. European registers, Russia excluded, show 36 TL-132s and 69 TL-232s earlier in that year.

== Variants ==
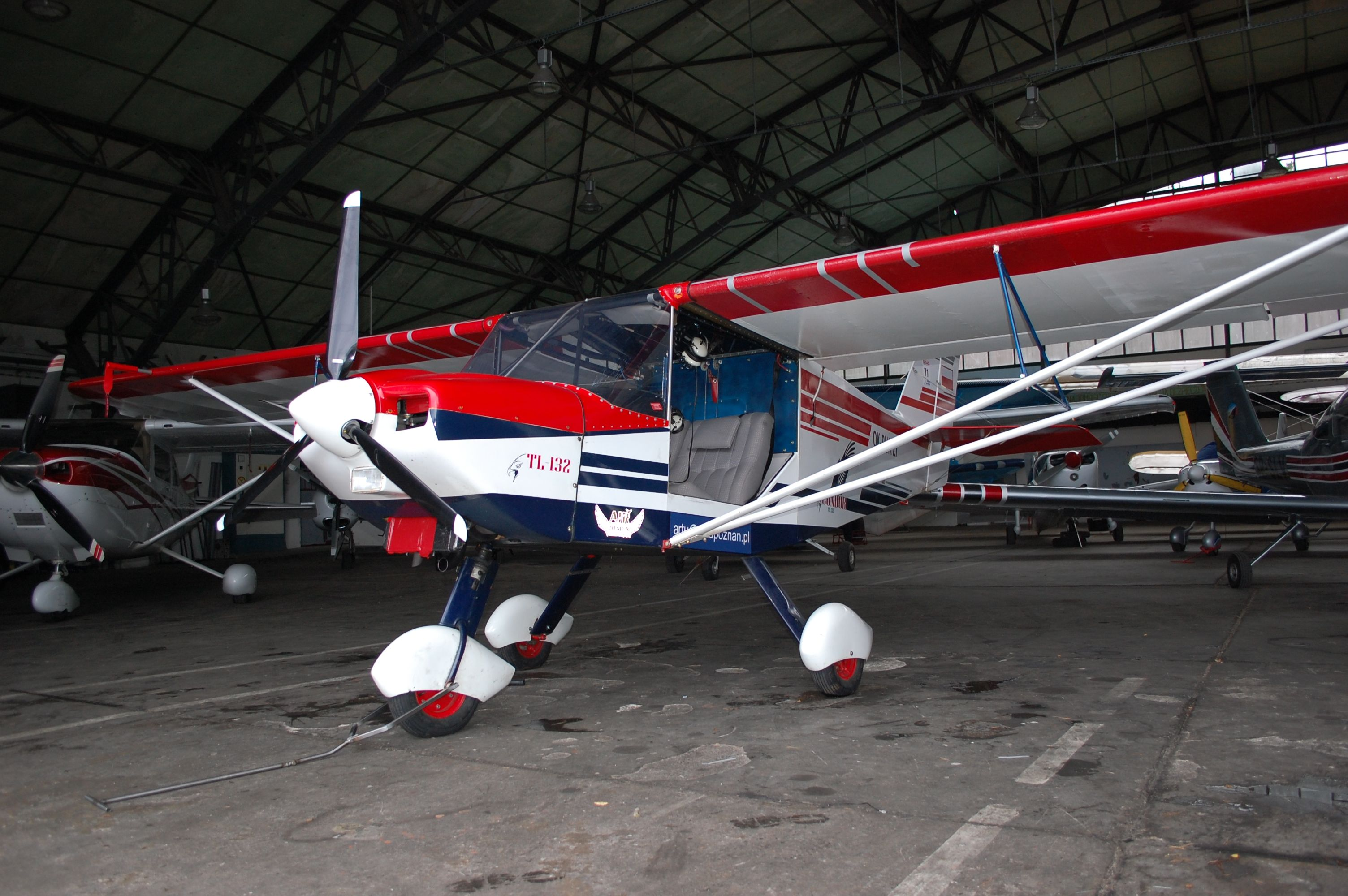
TL-132 Condor OK-RUA-27 without doors

TL-132 Condor
53 hp engine and high rear fuselage line reaching cabin at wing height.
TL-232 Condor Plus
65 or 80 hp engine and lowered rear fuselage line allowing rear cabin transparency and extended side windows aft of wing.
TL-232 Power Condor
As Condor Plus, but with 100 hp engine.

== Specifications (TL-232, tricycle undercarriage) ==
Data from Jane's all the World's Aircraft 2000/01

General characteristics

- Capacity: 2
- Length: 6.08 m (19 ft 11 in)
- Wingspan: 10.60 m (34 ft 9 in)
- Height: 2.30 m (7 ft 7 in)
- Wing area: 14.84 m^{2} (159.7 sq ft)
- Empty weight: 265 kg (584 lb) minimum
- Max takeoff weight: 450 kg (992 lb) Ultralight category limit
- Fuel capacity: 50L (11.0 Imp gal, 13.2 US gal)
- Powerplant: 1 × Rotax 582 UL-DCDI two cylinder upright in-line two stroke, 48.5 kW (65.0 hp)
- Propellers: 2-bladed

Performance

- Maximum speed: 160 km/h (99 mph, 86 kn)
- Cruise speed: 140 km/h (87 mph, 76 kn)
- Stall speed: 57 km/h (35 mph, 31 kn)
- Never exceed speed: 175 km/h (109 mph, 94 kn)
- Minimum control speed: 60 km/h (37 mph, 32 kn)
- Range: 450 km (280 mi, 240 nmi)
- Rate of climb: 4.6 m/s (910 ft/min) maximum, at sea level
