= List of aircraft (Ss) =

This is a list of aircraft in alphabetical order beginning with 'Ss'.

== SS ==
=== SSH ===
(SSH - Serwis Samolotow Historycznych-Janusz Karasiewicz – Janusz historic Aircraft Services)

- SSH T-131 Jungmann
- SSH Bü 133 Jungmeister

=== S S Pierce ===
(S S (Samuel) Pierce Aeroplane Co, Southampton, NY)

- S S Pierce Sporting Tractor
