= List of aircraft (Tw) =

This is a list of aircraft in alphabetical order beginning with 'Tw'.

== Tw ==
=== Twining ===
(H la V Twining, Los Angeles, CA)

- Twining 1910 Ornithopter
