= TC's Trikes Coyote =

American ultralight trike aircraft

Coyote

General information
- Type: Ultralight trike
- National origin: United States
- Manufacturer: TC's Trikes
- Designer: TC Blyth
- Status: Production completed

The TC's Trikes Coyote is an American ultralight trike that was designed by TC Blyth and produced by TC's Trikes of Soddy-Daisy, Tennessee. Originally known as the TC Trike, with the introduction of strut-braced Mustang wing the model became known as the Coyote.

== Design and development ==
The aircraft was designed to comply with the US FAR 103 Ultralight Vehicles rules, including the category's maximum empty weight of 254 lb (115 kg). The aircraft has a standard empty weight of 250 lb (113 kg). Early models feature a cable-braced hang glider-style high-wing, weight-shift controls, a single-seat or two-seats-in-tandem open cockpit, tricycle landing gear and a single engine in pusher configuration. Later Coyote models use the strut-braced North Wing Mustang wing made by North Wing Design.

The aircraft is made from bolted-together 6061-T6 aluminum and welded 4130 steel tubing, with its original TC Trikes Super D-16 single surface wing covered in Dacron sailcloth. The 172 sq ft (16.0 m^{2}) area wing is supported by a single tube-type kingpost and uses an "A" frame control bar.

The standard engine supplied was the 40 hp (30 kW) twin cylinder, two-stroke, air-cooled Rotax 447, with the 50 hp (37 kW) Rotax 503 optional. The standard single seat can be replaced with a tandem seat for two occupants.

== Variants ==
TC's Trike
Initial model with cable-braced TC's Trikes Super D-16 wing.
Coyote
Later model with strut-braced North Wing Mustang wing.

== Specifications (TC's Trike) ==
Data from Cliche

General characteristics

- Crew: one
- Wing area: 172 sq ft (16.0 m^{2})
- Empty weight: 250 lb (113 kg)
- Gross weight: 800 lb (363 kg)
- Fuel capacity: 5 U.S. gallons (19 L; 4.2 imp gal)
- Powerplant: 1 × Rotax 447 twin cylinder, two-stroke, air-cooled, single-ignition aircraft engine, 40 hp (30 kW)

Performance

- Cruise speed: 45 mph (72 km/h, 39 kn)
- Stall speed: 20 mph (32 km/h, 17 kn)
- Rate of climb: 800 ft/min (4.1 m/s)
