= List of aircraft (Sb) =

This is a list of aircraft in alphabetical order beginning with 'Sb'.

== Sb ==
=== SBM Development ===
- SBM Development RT216
