= Synergy Paramotors Synergy =

American paramotor

Synergy

General information
- Type: Paramotor
- National origin: United States
- Manufacturer: Synergy Paramotors
- Status: In production (2012)

History
- Introduction date: 2012

The Synergy Paramotors Synergy is an American paramotor, designed and produced by Synergy Paramotors of California for powered paragliding.

The aircraft was shown at AirVenture for the first time in 2012.

== Design and development ==
The Synergy was designed to comply with the US FAR 103 Ultralight Vehicles rules. It features a paraglider-style high-wing, single-place or two-place-in-tandem accommodation and a single Snap Ego 110 or C-Max 175 two-stroke engine in pusher configuration driving a 49 in (124 cm) propeller. The larger than usual diameter German Helix-Carbon propeller is employed to reduce noise and increase delivered thrust. The design uses a unique thumb-activated throttle switch that is available in left and right-handed configurations.

The paramotor frame incorporates two small wheels that prevent wear when moving the power unit and also add safety during takeoff. As is the case with all paramotors, take-off and landing is normally accomplished by foot.

The power unit can be broken down to a size of 32 X 24 X 18 inches (81.3 X 61.0 X 45.7 cm) for ground transportation in an automobile trunk. Reassembly requires only fastening nine Velcro straps.

== Specifications (Synergy) ==
Data from Kitplanes

General characteristics

- Crew: one
- Capacity: one passenger
- Powerplant: 1 × Snap Ego 110 single cylinder, two-stroke, air-cooled aircraft engine
- Propellers: 2-bladed Helix-Carbon fixed pitch propeller, 4 ft 1 in (1.24 m) diameter
