= SRCM Joigny =

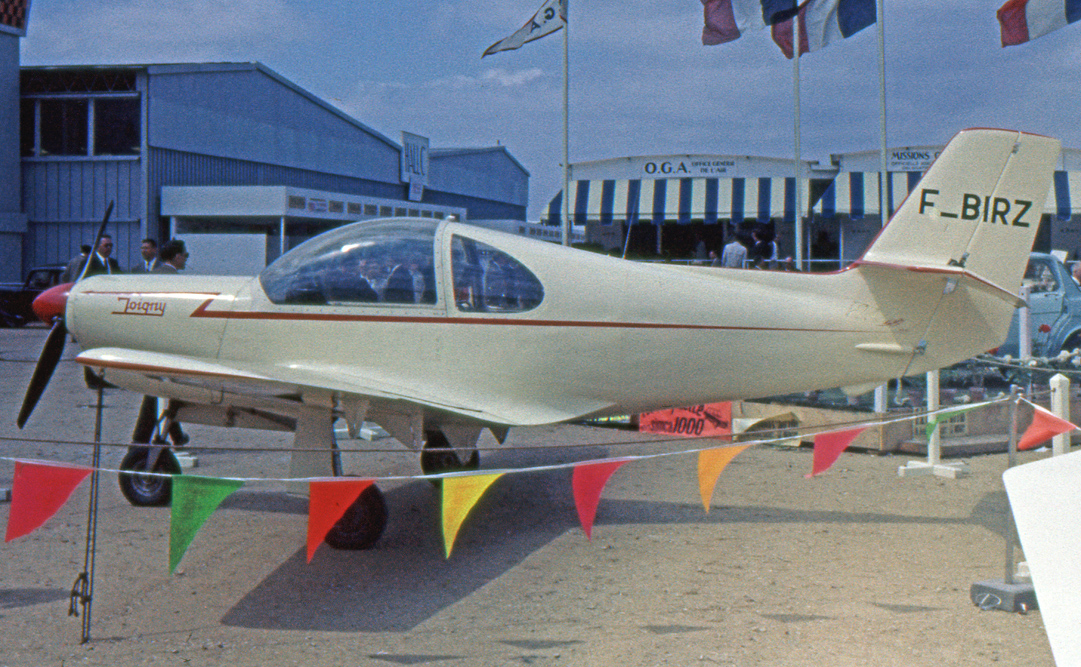
- The sole SRCM Joigny exhibited at the June 1963 Paris Air Show

General information
- Type: Light cabin monoplane
- National origin: France
- Manufacturer: Societe de Recherches et de Constructions Mecaniques
- Status: no longer extant
- Primary user: manufacturer
- Number built: 1

History
- Introduction date: 1960
- First flight: March 1960

The SRCM 153 Joigny was a French-built four-seat light cabin monoplane of the 1960s.

== Development and design ==
The side-by-side, two-seat Joigny light cabin monoplane was designed by the Societe de Recherches et de Constructions Mecaniques (SRCM) at their Joigny Yonne factory in April 1958. The firm had previously built under licence a number of Minicabs, Supercabs and Jodels, and originally intended to manufacture the Aviamilano F.8L Falco always under license. This project did not materialize and production series of Joigny was due to start in 1960. The Joigny was of all-wood construction and employed a fully retractable nosewheel undercarriage. The wing had a single main spar and an auxiliary main spar with leading edge torsion box and plywood covering. The aircraft's cabin section was built integral with the wing, the rear fuselage being a plywood monocoque.

Dual controls were provided, and the hydraulically operated double-slotted wing flaps were supplemented by an hydraulically operated air brake.

The development of a three/four seat version had been proposed.

== Operational history ==
The Joigny first flew in June 1959 from the Joigny airfield. Initially registered F-WIRZ, by the time of its public exhibition at the 1963 Paris Air Show at Le Bourget Airport, it was registered F-BIRZ. In 1964, it was still owned by the manufacturer, but no longer appears on the French civil aircraft register and is not preserved in any museum.

== Specifications ==
Data from Green, 1965

General characteristics

- Crew: 1
- Capacity: 1 passenger
- Length: 21 ft 0 in (6.40 m)
- Wingspan: 27 ft 4 in (8.33 m)
- Height: 7 ft 9 in (2.36 m)
- Wing area: 113 sq ft (10.5 m^{2})
- Empty weight: 1,323 lb (600 kg)
- Gross weight: 2,204 lb (1,000 kg)
- Powerplant: 1 × 150 h.p. Lycoming 0-320-A1A four-cylinder air-cooled piston, 150 hp (110 kW)

Performance

- Maximum speed: 199 mph (320 km/h, 173 kn)
- Cruise speed: 177 mph (285 km/h, 154 kn)
- Range: 930 mi (1,500 km, 810 nmi)
- Service ceiling: 23,600 ft (7,200 m)
- Rate of climb: 790 ft/min (4.0 m/s)
