= SlipStream Genesis =

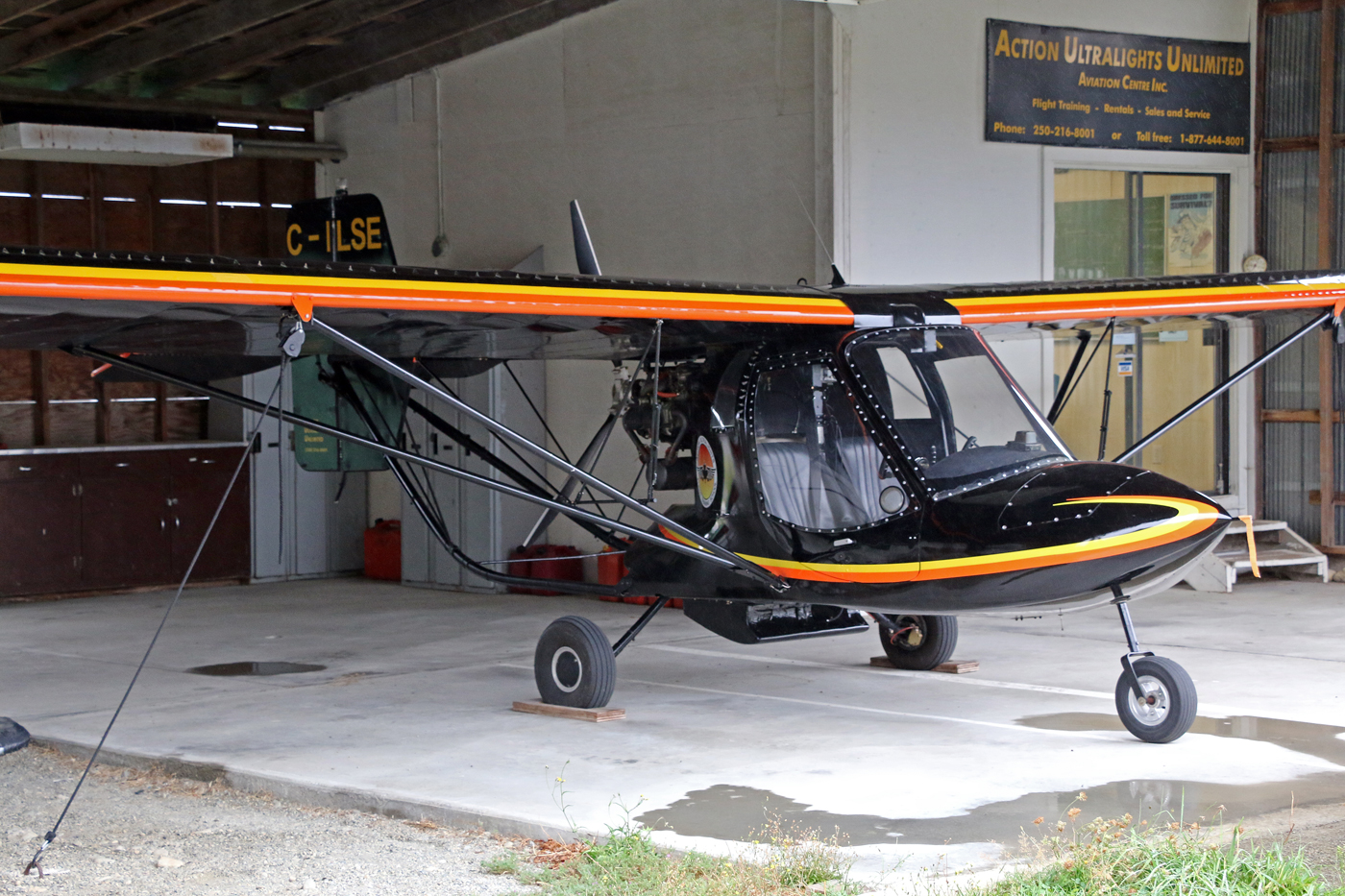
- Slipstream Revelation

General information
- Type: Kit aircraft
- National origin: United States
- Manufacturer: SlipStream International
- Designer: Chuck Hamilton
- Status: In production (2015)

History
- Introduction date: 1992
- First flight: 1992

The SlipStream Genesis is a family of American, strut-braced, high wing, pusher configuration, tricycle gear aircraft, produced in kit form, for amateur construction. Designed by Chuck Hamilton, the series were originally produced by Innovation Engineering of Davenport, Iowa and more recently by SlipStream International of Wautoma, Wisconsin.

== Design and development ==
Developed in 1991 for the homebuilt aircraft market, the Genesis is built from aluminium tubing, riveted together using stainless steel gussets for support. The tail surfaces are suspended from a distinctive series of four tubes that curve to allow clearance for the pusher propeller. The wings and tail surfaces are covered with doped aircraft fabric or optionally with pre-sewn Dacron sailcloth envelopes.

The series is unusual in having control yokes in place of the more common control sticks used on this class of aircraft.

The Genesis can be fitted with floats or skis. Options include larger fuel capacity, electrically-operated flaperons and trim, wheel pants and ballistic parachute.

== Variants ==
Genesis
Initial two-seat model for the homebuilt market. Acceptable power range is 50 to 100 hp (37 to 75 kW) and engines used include 50 hp (37 kW) Rotax 503, 64 hp (48 kW) Rotax 582, 80 hp (60 kW) Rotax 912UL, 100 hp (75 kW) Rotax 912ULS and 115 hp (86 kW) Rotax 914. First flown in 1992. 200 were reported completed by 2011 and the type remains in production.
Genesis XL
Two-seat model for the homebuilt market with wider chord wing. Acceptable power range is 50 to 100 hp (37 to 75 kW) and engines used include 50 hp (37 kW) Rotax 503, 64 hp (48 kW) Rotax 582, 80 hp (60 kW) Rotax 912UL, 100 hp (75 kW) Rotax 912ULS and 115 hp (86 kW) Rotax 914.
Revelation
Two-seat ultralight trainer. Structurally identical to the Genesis, but with a simplified semi-enclosed cockpit, no doors and a longer 30.7 ft (9.4 m) wingspan. Standard engine is the 50 hp (37 kW) Rotax 503, with other engines up to 115 hp (86 kW) optional, including the 64 hp (48 kW) Rotax 582, 80 hp (60 kW) Rotax 912UL, 100 hp (75 kW) Rotax 912ULS, 115 hp (86 kW) Rotax 914 and the 81 hp (60 kW) Verner 133M. Some examples have also used the 73 hp (54 kW) Subaru EA-81 engine. 150 were reported completed by 2011 and the type remains in production.
Skyblaster
Two-seat, twin engined model for the homebuilt market, powered by two 50 hp (37 kW) Rotax 503 engines, mounted in push-pull configuration. Four reported built by 2001, the model is no longer in production.
SkyQuest
Two-seat, twin engined model for the homebuilt market, powered by two 50 hp (37 kW) Rotax 503 engines, mounted in pusher configuration, with the second engine mounted above the cabin. First flown in 1996, seven were reported as completed in 2003, it is no longer in production.
Scepter
Single-seat, single- engined model for the homebuilt market, powered by a standard 40 hp (30 kW) Rotax 447 engine, mounted in pusher configuration. Other engines used include the 50 hp (37 kW) Rotax 503 and 45 hp (34 kW) Zanzottera MZ 201. Twenty were reported completed by 2004, the type is no longer in production.
Ultra Sport
Two-seat development of the Revelation for the US light-sport aircraft market, powered by a standard 60 hp (45 kW) HKS 700E engine. Four had been completed and flown by 2011.

== Specifications (Revelation) ==
Data from Cliche and SlipStream

General characteristics

- Crew: one
- Capacity: one passenger
- Length: 19 ft 4 in (5.89 m)
- Wingspan: 30 ft 8 in (9.35 m)
- Height: 6 ft 3.5 in (1.918 m)
- Wing area: 154 sq ft (14.3 m^{2})
- Empty weight: 465 lb (211 kg)
- Gross weight: 1,100 lb (499 kg)
- Fuel capacity: 10 US gallons (38 litres)
- Powerplant: 1 × Rotax 503 twin cylinder, two-stroke aircraft engine, 50 hp (37 kW)

Performance

- Cruise speed: 66 mph (106 km/h, 57 kn)
- Stall speed: 43 mph (69 km/h, 37 kn)
- Never exceed speed: 120 mph (190 km/h, 100 kn)
- Range: 135 mi (217 km, 117 nmi)
- Service ceiling: 6,000 ft (1,800 m)
- g limits: +7/-5.6
- Maximum glide ratio: 8:1
- Rate of climb: 750–1,000 ft/min (3.8–5.1 m/s) dependent on weight and engine
- Wing loading: 7.30 lb/sq ft (35.6 kg/m^{2})

== See also ==
Aircraft of comparable role, configuration, and era

- Quicksilver GT500
- Titan Tornado
