= List of aircraft (Sd) =

This is a list of aircraft in alphabetical order beginning with 'Sd'.

== Sd ==
=== SDB ===
(SDB, an enterprise of the Moscow State Technical University of Civil Aviation, Moscow, Russia)

- SDB Karat
- SDB Poisk

=== SD Planes ===
- SD-1 Mini-Sport
