= TL-Ultralight =

Czech aircraft manufacturer

- Company type: Privately held company
- Industry: Aerospace
- Founded: 1989
- Headquarters: Hradec Králové, Czech Republic
- Products: Kit aircraft Ultralight aircraft
- Owner: Jiří Tlustý
- Website: www.tl-ultralight.cz

TL-Ultralight is an aircraft manufacturer based in Hradec Králové, Czech Republic. The company started out as a builder of ultralight trikes and now specializes in the design and manufacture of composite ultralight aircraft.

The company is owned by Jiří Tlustý and was founded in 1989.

One of the company's earliest aircraft designs was the TL-22 Duo, a conventional ultralight trike model, that is now out of production.

In 2014 the company's product line included the TL-3000 Sirius and three variants of the TL-2000 Sting: the S3, S4 and RG models.

== Aircraft ==
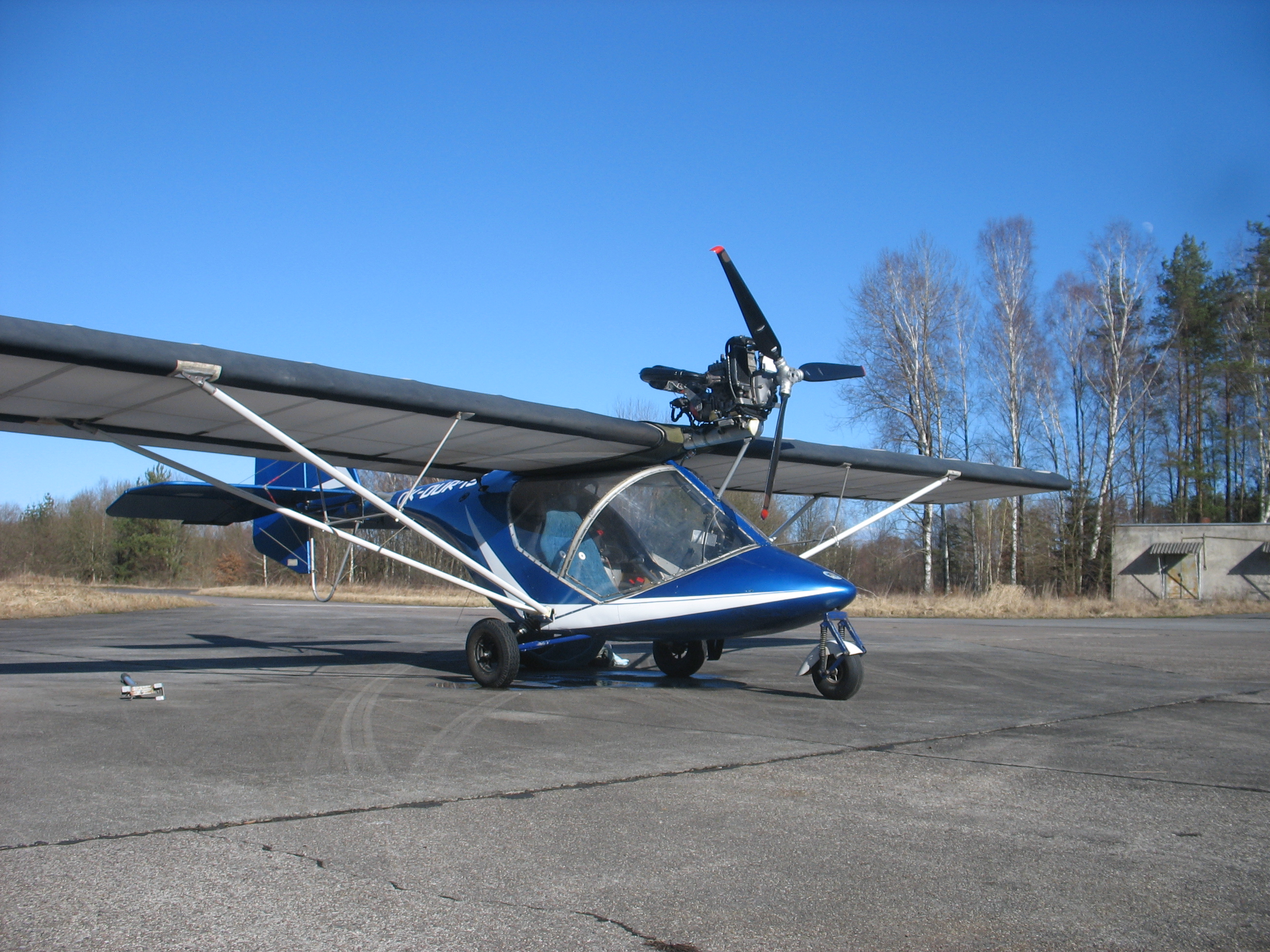
TL Ultralight TL-32 Typhoon

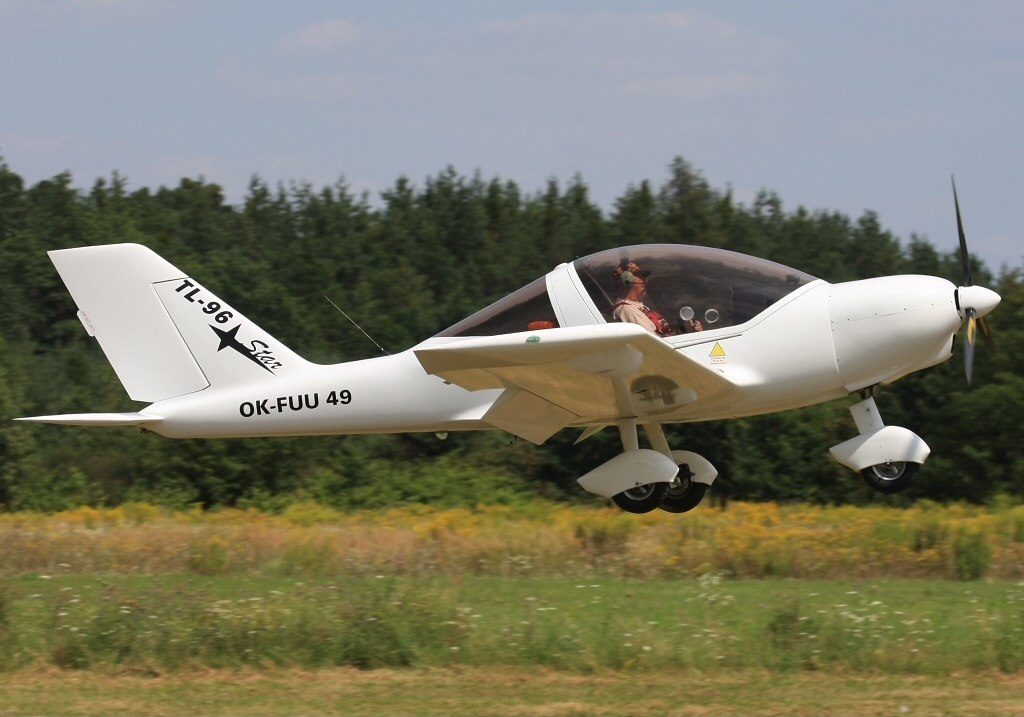
TL Ultralight TL-96 Star

Summary of aircraft built by TL Ultralight
Model name	First flight	Number built	Type
TL-22 Duo	1990s	50 (1998)	Ultralight trike
TL-32 Typhoon	1991	>200	Fabric covered high-wing ultralight aircraft
TL-96 Star	1997		Composite low-wing ultralight aircraft
TL-132 Condor	1993	115 (2010)	Fabric covered high-wing ultralight aircraft
TL-232 Condor Plus			Fabric covered high-wing ultralight aircraft
TL-2000 Sting	2002		Composite low-wing ultralight aircraft
TL-3000 Sirius	2008	22 (2010)	Composite high-wing ultralight aircraft
Stream	2015		Tandem-seat composite low-wing ultralight aircraft
