= TL-Ultralight Stream =

Czech ultralight aircraft

Stream
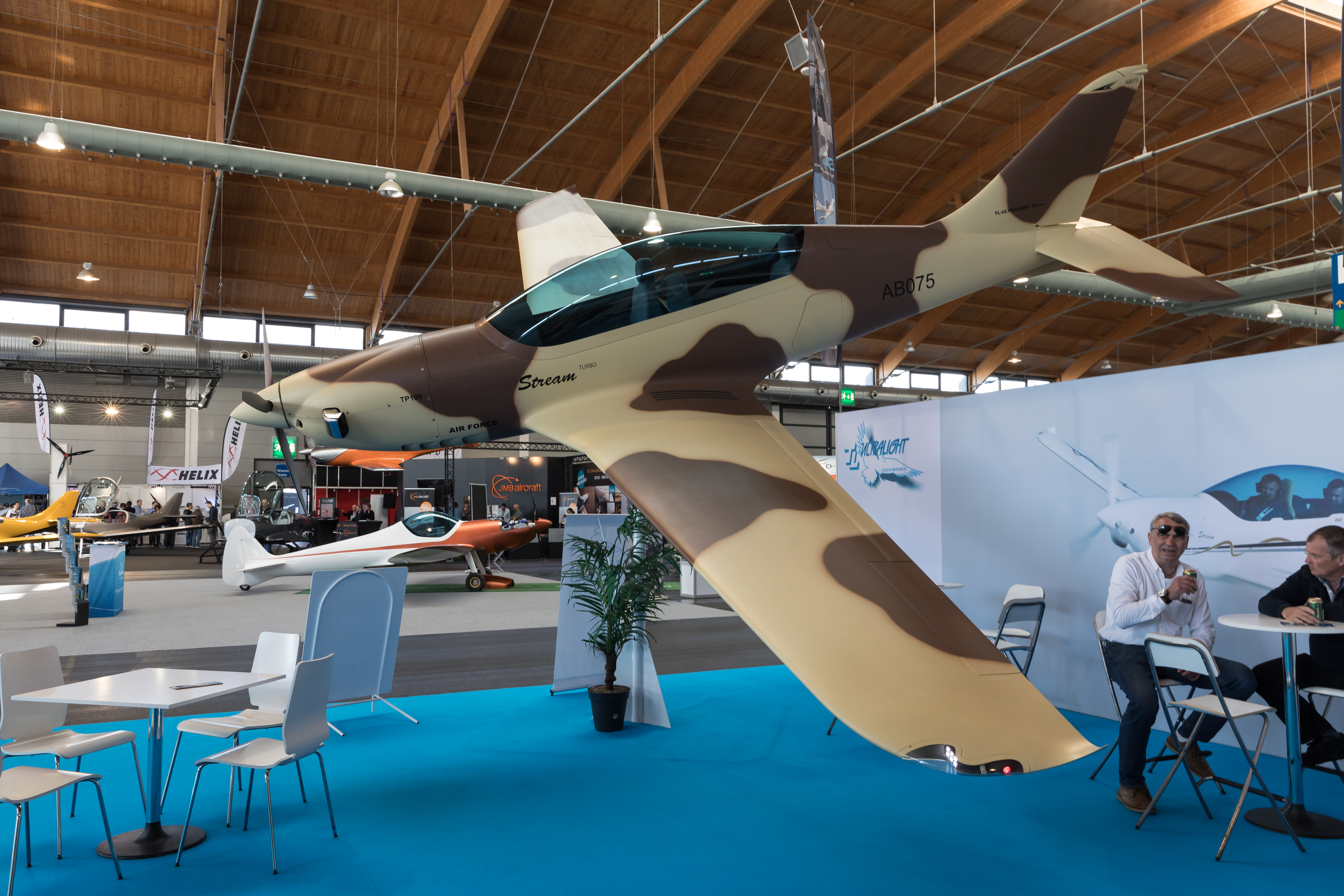
- TL-Ultralight Stream at AERO Friedrichshafen 2018

General information
- Type: Ultralight aircraft
- National origin: Czech Republic
- Manufacturer: TL-Ultralight
- Status: In production (2017)

History
- Introduction date: 2013

The TL-Ultralight Stream is a Czech ultralight aircraft, designed and produced by TL-Ultralight of Hradec Králové, introduced at the AERO Friedrichshafen show in 2013.

== Design and development ==
The Stream is the company's fastest design to date. It was designed to comply with the Fédération Aéronautique Internationale microlight rules. It features a cantilever low-wing, an enclosed cockpit with two-seats-in-tandem under a bubble canopy, retractable tricycle landing gear and a single engine in tractor configuration.

The aircraft is made from composite materials. Its 9.0 m (29.5 ft) span wing mounts flaps. Standard engines available are the 100 hp (75 kW) Rotax 912ULS and 912iS, and the turbocharged 115 hp (86 kW) Rotax 914 four-stroke powerplants, driving a three-bladed PowerMax propeller.

== Operational history ==
Reviewer Marino Boric described the design in a 2015 review as "very sleek" and added that it "should give the pilot the feeling of piloting a jet-fighter."

== Specifications (Stream) ==
Data from Tacke and manufacturer

General characteristics

- Crew: one
- Capacity: one passenger
- Length: 6.785 m (22 ft 3 in)
- Wingspan: 9.00 m (29 ft 6 in)
- Height: 2.475 m (8 ft 1 in)
- Wing area: 9.962 m^{2} (107.23 sq ft)
- Empty weight: 297 kg (655 lb)
- Gross weight: 600 kg (1,323 lb) LSA
- Fuel capacity: 90
- Powerplant: 1 × Rotax 912ULS four cylinder, liquid and air-cooled, four stroke aircraft engine, 75 kW (101 hp)
- Propellers: 3-bladed PowerMax

Performance

- Maximum speed: 325 km/h (202 mph, 175 kn)
- Stall speed: 65 km/h (40 mph, 35 kn)
- Never exceed speed: 335 km/h (208 mph, 181 kn)
- Range: 1,400 km (870 mi, 760 nmi)
- Rate of climb: 6 m/s (1,200 ft/min)
