= List of aircraft (Ty) =

This is a list of aircraft in alphabetical order beginning with 'Ty'.

== Ty ==
=== Tyler ===
(William B Tyler, Detroit, MI)

- Tyler A

=== Tyndall ===
(Joseph E Tyndall, Richmond, VA)

- Tyndall Mr Splinters
