= TL Ultralight TL-22 Duo =

Czech ultralight trike

TL-22 Duo

General information
- Type: Ultralight trike
- National origin: Czech Republic
- Manufacturer: TL Ultralight
- Status: Production completed
- Number built: 50 (1998)

The TL Ultralight TL-22 Duo is a Czech ultralight trike that was designed and produced by TL Ultralight of Hradec Králové. Production has been completed, but when it was available the aircraft was supplied as a complete ready-to-fly-aircraft or as a kit for amateur construction.

== Design and development ==
The aircraft was designed to comply with the Fédération Aéronautique Internationale microlight category, including the category's maximum gross weight of 450 kg (992 lb). The aircraft has a maximum gross weight of 361 kg (796 lb). It features a cable-braced hang glider-style high-wing, weight-shift controls, a two-seats-in-tandem open cockpit with a cockpit fairing, tricycle landing gear with wheel pants and a single engine in pusher configuration.

The aircraft is made from bolted-together aluminum tubing, with a fibreglass cockpit fairing and its double surface wing covered in Dacron sailcloth. Its 10.6 m (34.8 ft) span wing is supported by a single tube-type kingpost, uses an "A" frame weight-shift control bar and has a wing area of 13.8 m^{2} (149 sq ft). The standard powerplant used is a twin cylinder, liquid-cooled, two-stroke, dual-ignition 64 hp (48 kW) Rotax 582 engine. The aircraft has an empty weight of 160 kg (353 lb) and a gross weight of 361 kg (796 lb), giving a useful load of 201 kg (443 lb). With full fuel of 42 litres (9.2 imp gal; 11 US gal) the payload is 171 kg (377 lb).

== Operational history ==
By 1998 the company reported that 50 aircraft were flying.

== Specifications (TL-22 Duo) ==
Data from AeroCrafter

General characteristics

- Crew: one
- Capacity: one passenger
- Wingspan: 10.60 m (34.78 ft)
- Wing area: 13.81 m^{2} (148.6 sq ft)
- Empty weight: 160 kg (353 lb)
- Gross weight: 361 kg (795 lb)
- Fuel capacity: 42 litres (9.2 imp gal; 11 US gal)
- Powerplant: 1 × Rotax 582 twin cylinder, liquid-cooled, two stroke aircraft engine, 48 kW (64 hp)
- Propellers: 3-bladed ground adjustable composite

Performance

- Maximum speed: 121 km/h (75 mph, 65 kn)
- Cruise speed: 71 km/h (44 mph, 38 kn)
- Stall speed: 42 km/h (26 mph, 23 kn)
- Range: 320 km (200 mi, 170 nmi)
- Wing loading: 26 kg/m^{2} (5.3 lb/sq ft)
