= List of aircraft (Tg) =

This is a list of aircraft in alphabetical order beginning with 'Tg'.

== Tg ==
=== TGA ===
(Talleres Generales de Aviación)

- Sea Teul Zacateca - Antonio Sea
