= Svenska Aero Jaktfalken =

Fighter aircraft

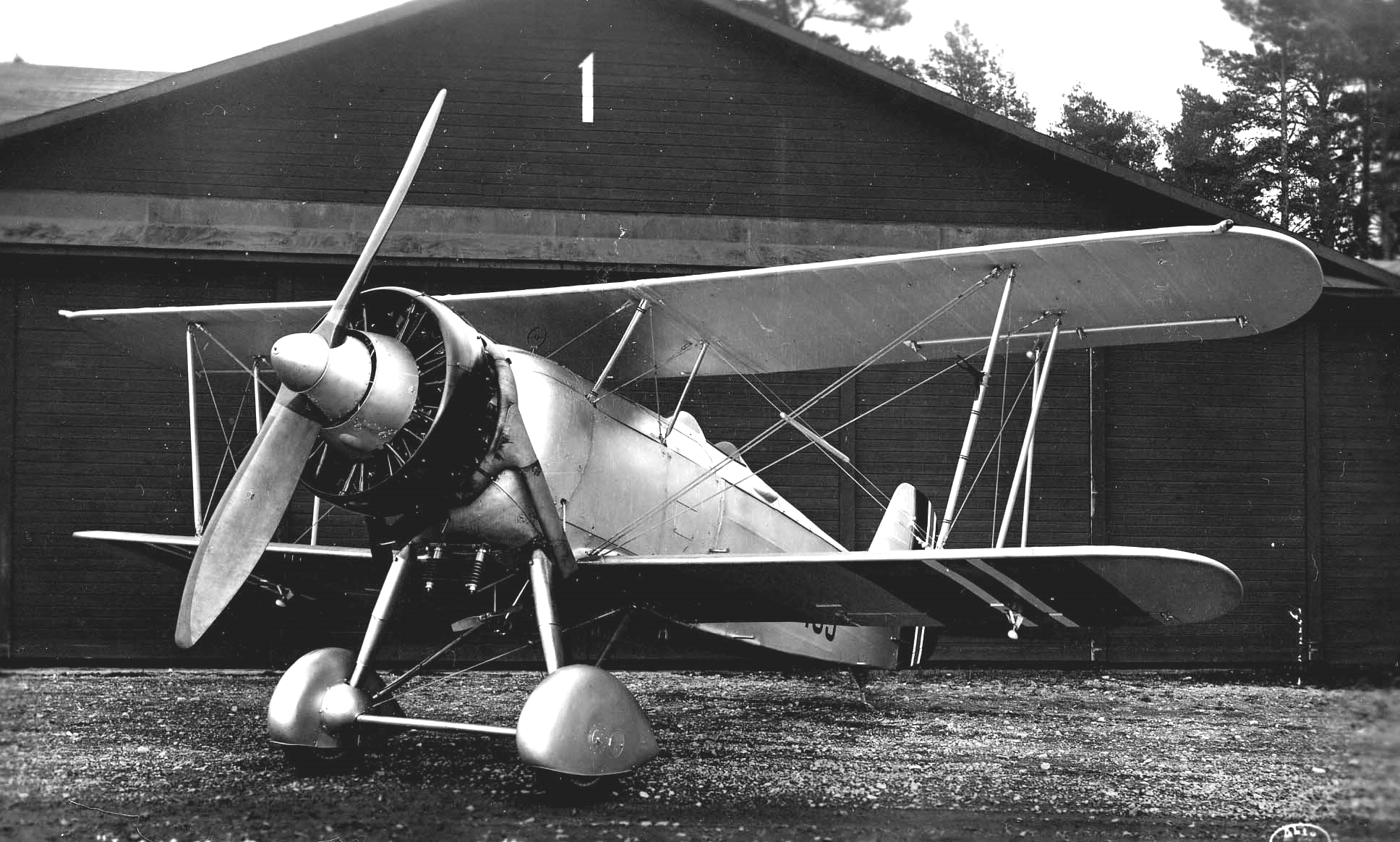
- SA-14E Jaktfalken II (Armstrong Siddeley Panther IIIA engine) for the Norwegian Army Air Service, ca 1931.

General information
- Type: Fighter
- Manufacturer: Svenska Aero, ASJA
- Designer: Carl Clemens Bücker
- Primary users: Swedish Air Force Finnish Air Force; Royal Norwegian Air Force
- Number built: 19

History
- First flight: 1929

Svenska Aero Jaktfalken ("The Gyrfalcon") was a Swedish biplane fighter aircraft, constructed in the late 1920s. The aircraft was first manufactured by Svenska Aero from 1929 to 1932 and later by AB Svenska Järnvägsverkstädernas Aeroplanavdelning (ASJA) from 1934 to 1935.

== History ==
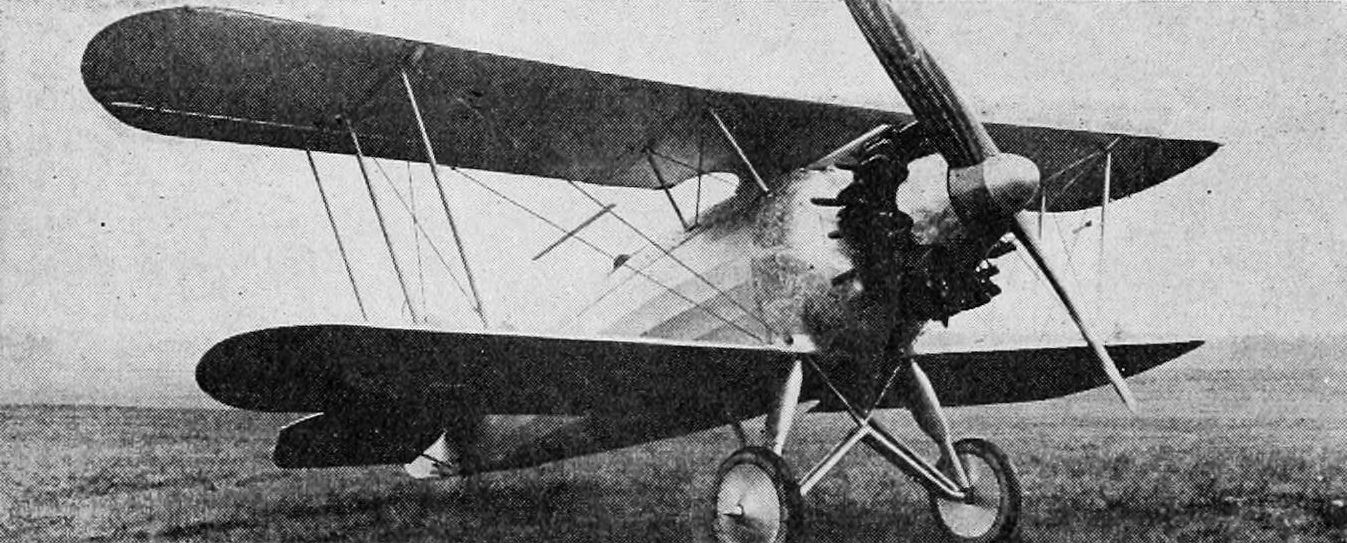
SA-11 Jaktfalken, 1 February 1930

Jaktfalken was constructed and manufactured by Svenska Aero as a private venture, internally designated the SA-11 for the initial variant. The company contacted the Swedish Aerial board, requesting guidelines and wishes for a fighter aircraft. When no reply was received, Svenska Aero began to look at foreign designs to get some guidance. Jaktfalken was a conventional biplane equipped with an Armstrong Siddeley Jaguar 500 hp 14-cylinder radial engine. The landing gear was fixed and there was a skid under the tail. The fuselage framework was made of welded beams covered with fabric. The fore and aft part of the fuselage was covered in aluminium sheet. There was a fuel tank between the engine and the cockpit, which contained enough fuel for 2.5 hours of flying.

The Swedish Air Force test pilot Nils Söderberg was given the mission to try out the new prototype at the Barkarby air force base. After one of his landings, he said, "this is the best aircraft that I have flown so far."

On November 11, 1929, Jaktfalken was presented for representatives from authorities and the press. The Swedish Air administration decided that three Jaktfalken and three British Bristol Bulldog II fighters were to be ordered for comparative tests.

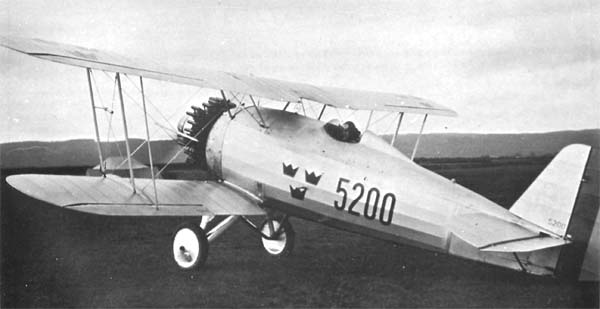
SA-11 Jaktfalken in the Swedish Air Force as J 5.

The prototype was bought by the Swedish Air Force on January 9, 1930 for 81,654 Swedish krona, and given the designation J 5. By February 1930, the Air administration decided to use a Bristol Jupiter engine as the air force standard engine. The designer, Carl Clemens Bücker was forced to modify the two ordered aircraft, by making new engine attachments and make modifications to the fuselage. These aircraft were given the name SA-14 Jaktfalken I (or J 6 in the Swedish Air Force). The order was followed by a new one for 5 aircraft with Jupiter VII engines in 1930, designated SA-14 Jaktfalken II (or J 6A in the Swedish Air Force). During test flights, powerful vibrations were encountered. Both Svenska Aero and CFV tried to solve the problem, without success. The aircraft was still approved by the Swedish Air Force. Bücker and CFV tried to modify the landing gear and the fuselage after the delivery. The aircraft had now a more angular fuselage and the Jupiter VIIF was chosen as the engine. The Swedish Air Force received three Jaktfalken IIs in 1932.

Argentine and Japanese military representatives tested the aircraft but placed no orders. The sole export order would be from Norway, who ordered one aircraft in 1931, equipped with an Armstrong Siddeley Panther IIIA engine to compare against a Hawker Fury. When the Swedish Air Force wanted an additional seven aircraft in 1933, Svenska Aero had been bought by ASJA and the deliveries come from the new manufacturer, who made some minor modifications to the stabilizer and the windshield.

== Versions ==
- SA 11 Jaktfalken - Prototype aircraft, equipped with an AS Jaguar 500 hp engine. One was delivered to the Swedish Air Force as a J 5.
- SA 14 Jaktfalken I - A modified fuselage with a Bristol Jupiter VI 450 hp engine. Seven were delivered under the designation J 6 to the Swedish Air Force.
- SA 14 Jaktfalken II - A modified fuselage and landing gear with a Jupiter VIIF 500 hp engine. Three were delivered to the Swedish Air Force under the designation J 6A.
  - SA 14 Jaktfalken II (ASJA L-5) - Produced by ASJA, with a modified stabilizer and windscreen. Seven were delivered to the Swedish Air Force under the designation J 6B.
- SA 14E Jaktfalken II – Similar to the SA 14 Jaktfalken II, but equipped with an Armstrong Siddeley Panther IIIA engine for Norway. One built and delivered.

== Operational history ==
=== Use in Sweden ===
The series produced aircraft was to be called J 6 in Swedish service. After the Swedish Air Force bought a Svenska Aero Jaktfalken J 5 in 1930 Flygstyrelsen (The Swedish Air Board) decided to use a Bristol Jupiter as the standard engine.

Two J 5s were already ordered but were not ready for delivery. The designer, Carl Clemens Bücker, was forced to reconstruct the aircraft from the firewall forward to make room for the new engine. The modified aircraft was given the designation J 6.

Svenska Aero wanted more orders of the type in order to bring down the cost and rationalize production. Flygstyrelsen then suggested that another four J 6s should be bought for the Swedish Air Force.

The first J 6 was flown in 1930, at the test flight, the aircraft suffered from heavy vibrations in the tail section. The aircraft was then transferred to the CFV where they tried to modify the construction to reduce the vibrations. Although the problems weren't solved by the modifications, the aircraft was approved by the air force.

The third aircraft was ready in the autumn of 1930. This aircraft had similar problems with vibrations as the first prototype. The aircraft crashed during the first flight and the test pilot died. This test pilot was Einar Lundborg, a national hero, who had rescued the Arctic explorer Umberto Nobile. The accident caused a major storm against the leadership of the Swedish Air Force. The accident was investigated by a commission. Two J 5s and five J 6s were transferred to the Swedish Air Force.

Bücker later modified the aircraft's fuselage and gave it a new landing gear and Jupiter VIIF engine. The Swedish Air Force ordered 3 aircraft of this modified type and gave them the designation J 6A. These aircraft were delivered during the summer of 1932 and they were stationed at the F 3 Malmslätt air force base. All J 6's were transferred between 1932 and 1934 to F 1, in order to be used for fighter training.

Another seven aircraft were ordered by May 1933 but the company had been merged in 1932 with ASJ. The aircraft was thereafter produced and delivered by ASJA. As soon as the order had been received, manufacture began. The first aircraft was ready by November 1934. All aircraft were ready and were delivered by June 1935. The Swedish Air Force designated these aircraft J 6B.

When all fighters were transferred from the Västmanland Wing (F 1) (where F 8 had been a detachment) to Svea Wing (F 8) in October 1938, there were seven J 6's left in the air force, they were used as fighter trainers. Three aircraft were given to Finland during the Winter War 1939–1940, all the remaining aircraft were scrapped in 1941.

=== Use in Finland ===
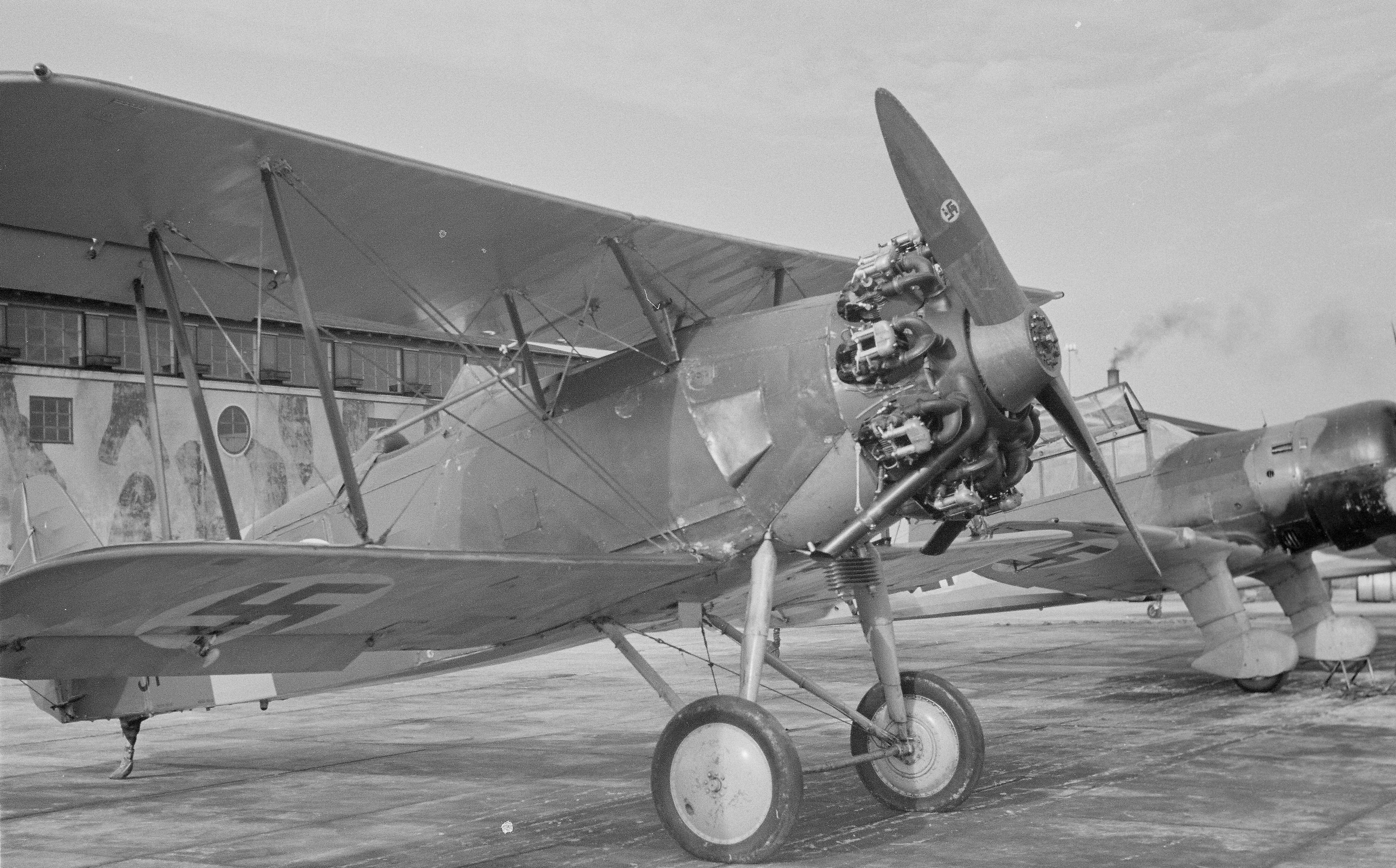
JF-224 (J 6B) in Finnish service, 22 July 1943.

Sweden gave three Jaktfalkens (two J 6Bs and one J 6A) to the Finnish Air Force on 8 December 1939. These were the oldest ones of the type that Sweden had; it was common to give away the oldest equipment as military aid. The aircraft were designated the two-letter code JF (for Jakt-Falken, numbers JF-219, JF-224 and JF-228, the latter two being J 6Bs) and were used for training at the airfield at Kauhava until 1945, when all were scrapped.

== Operators ==
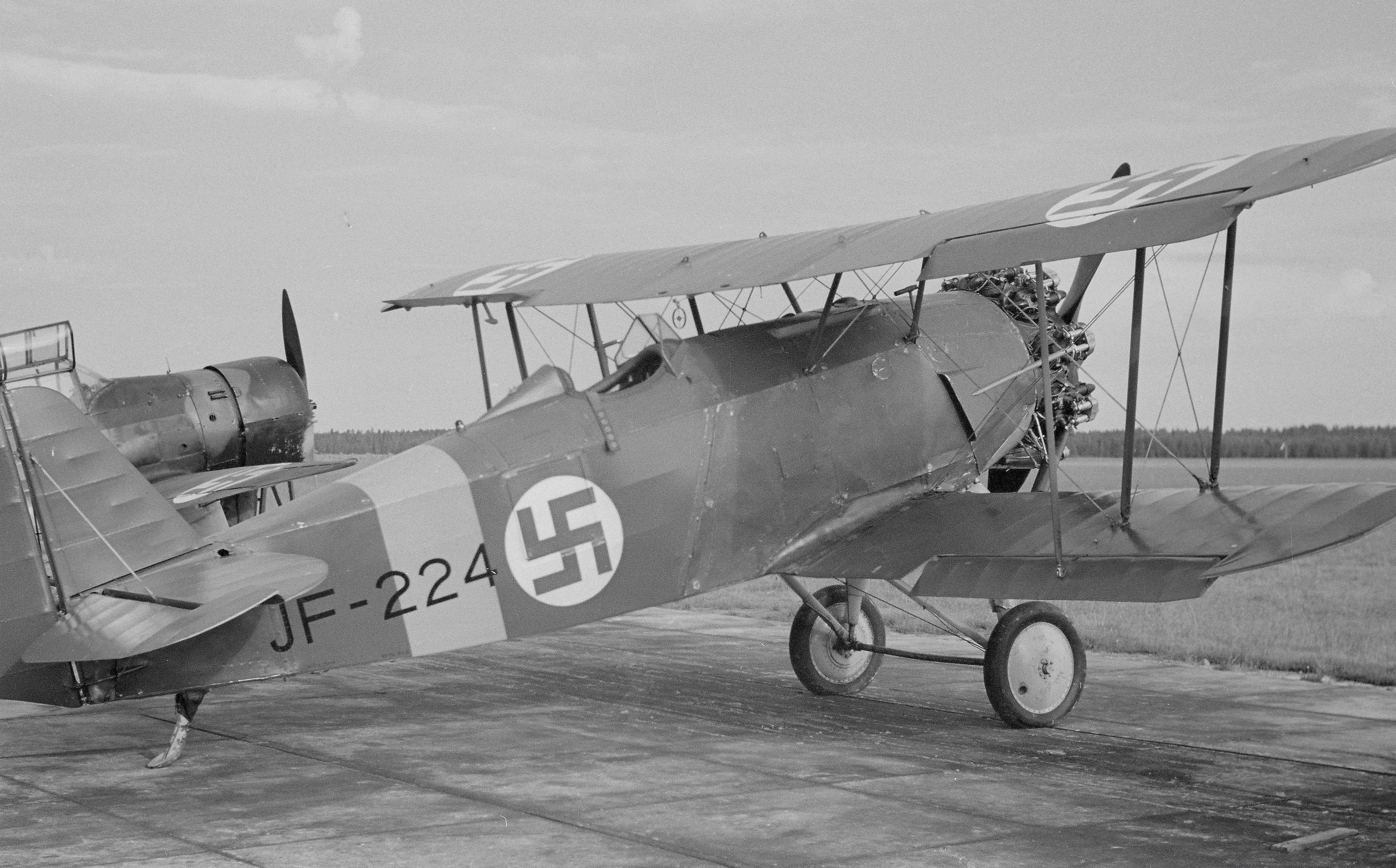
JF-224 (J 6B) in Finnish service, 22 July 1943.

Finland
Finnish Air Force
- 1 × JF-219 – SA 14 Jaktfalken II (SA-produced, Jupiter VIIF engine), J 6A donated from Sweden
- 2 × JF-224, JF-228) – SA 14 Jaktfalken II (ASJA-produced, Jupiter VIIF engine), J 6B donated from Sweden
Latvia
Latvian Navy
Norway
Norwegian Army Air Service
- 1 × SA-14E – SA 14E Jaktfalken II (SA-produced, AS Panther IIIA engine), trials against Hawker Fury
Sweden
Royal Swedish Air Force
- 1 × J 5 – SA-11 Jaktfalkten (SA-produced, AS Jaguar engine)
- 7 × J 6 – SA 14 Jaktfalken I (SA-produced, Jupiter VI engine)
- 3 × J 6A – SA 14 Jaktfalken II (SA-produced, Jupiter VIIF engine)
- 7 × J 6B – SA 14 Jaktfalken II (ASJA-produced, Jupiter VIIF engine)

== Specifications (Jaktfalken II) ==
Data from Complete Book of Fighters

General characteristics

- Crew: 1
- Length: 7.5 m (24 ft 7 in)
- Wingspan: 8.8 m (28 ft 10 in)
- Height: 3.46 m (11 ft 4 in)
- Wing area: 21.8 m^{2} (235 sq ft)
- Empty weight: 946 kg (2,086 lb)
- Max takeoff weight: 1,470 kg (3,241 lb)
- Powerplant: 1 × Bristol Jupiter VIIF (-cylinder air-cooled radial piston engine, 390 kW (520 hp)
- Propellers: 2-bladed fixed-pitch wooden propeller

Performance

- Maximum speed: 310 km/h (190 mph, 170 kn)
- Cruise speed: 260 km/h (160 mph, 140 kn)
- Range: 550 km (340 mi, 300 nmi)
- Service ceiling: 7,800 m (25,600 ft)

Armament

- Guns: 2× 8 mm (8×63mm) ksp m/22 machine guns (license built Browning .30 AN/M2's) with 500 rounds each
