= TL Ultralight TL-96 Star =

Czech ultralight aircraft

TL-96 Star
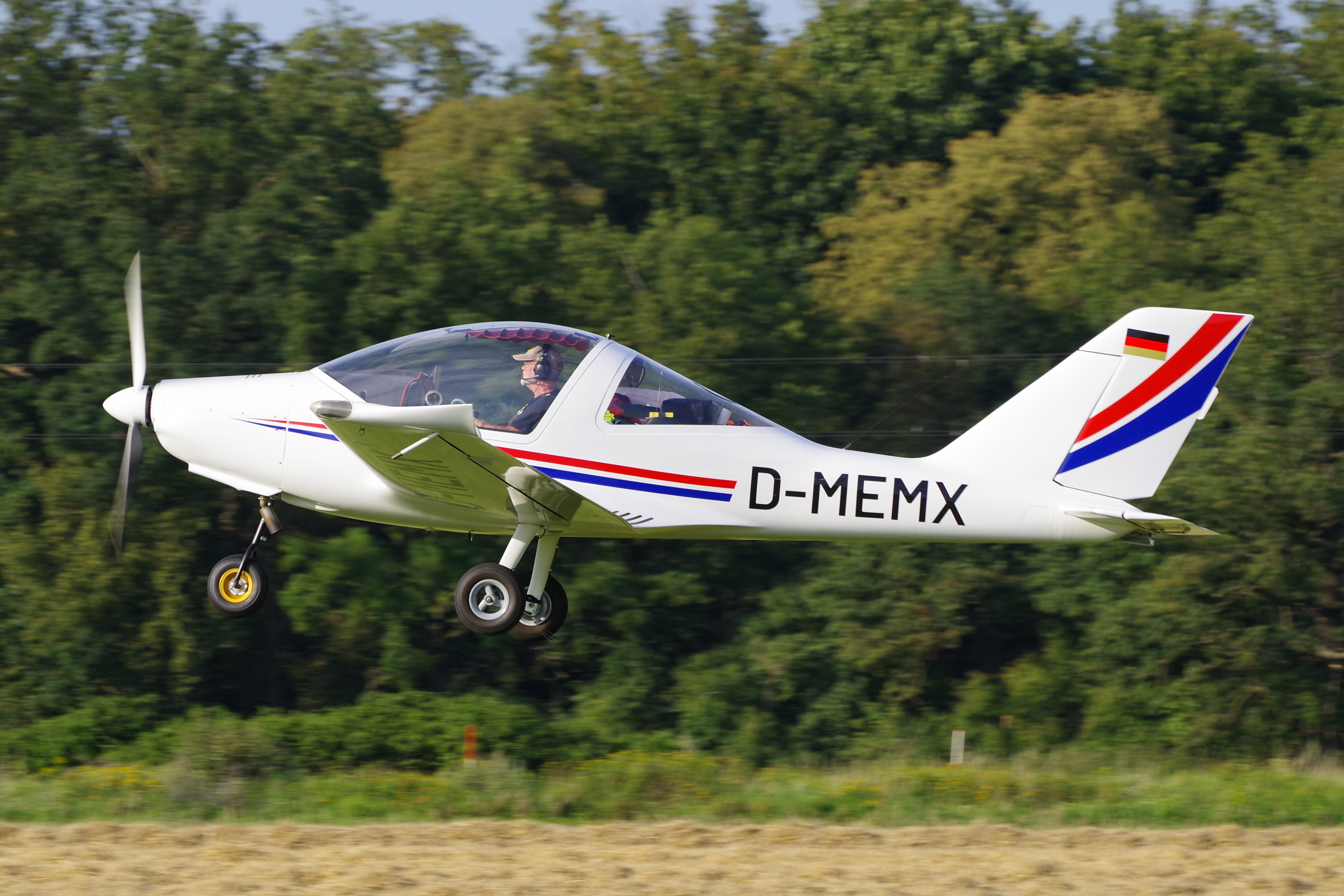
- TL-96 Sting

General information
- Type: Two side by side seat ultralight
- National origin: Czech Republic
- Manufacturer: TL-Ultralight

History
- First flight: November 1997

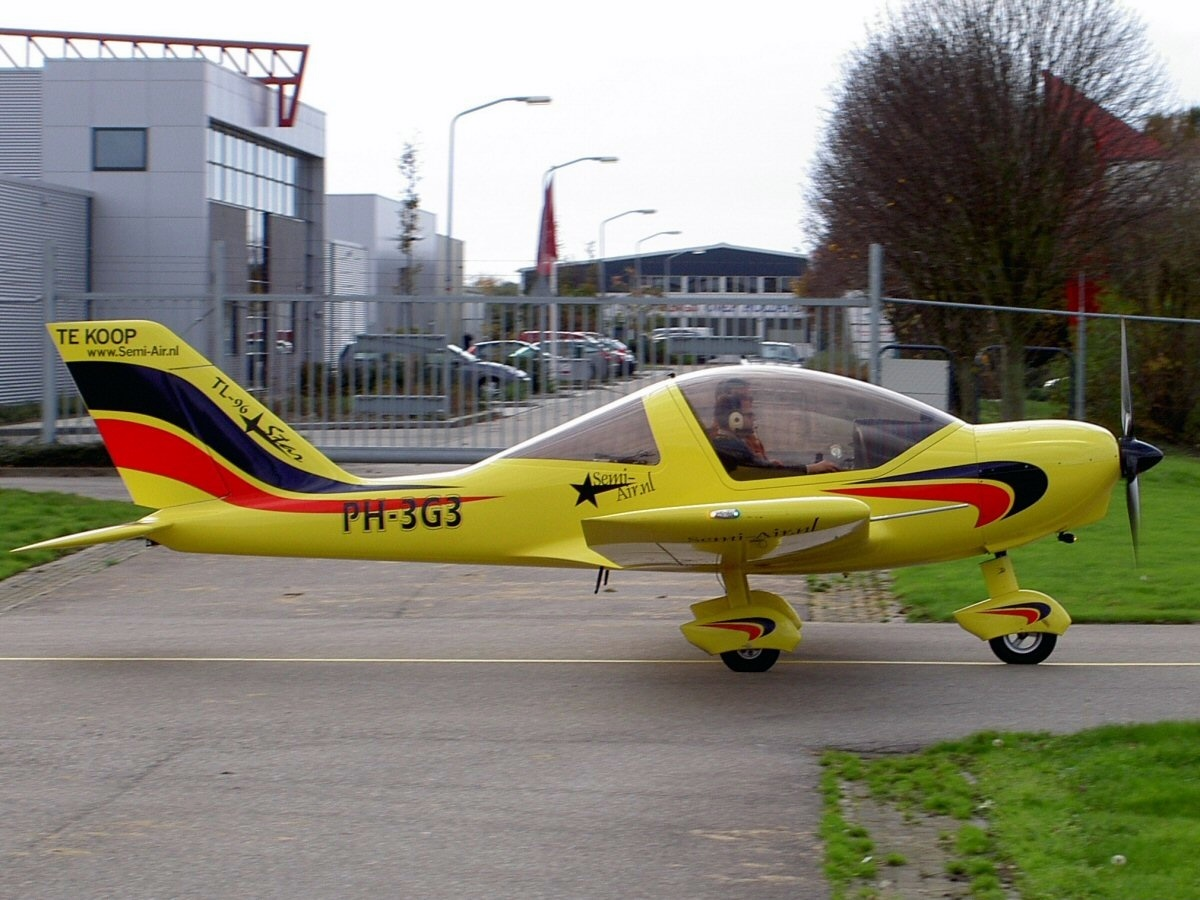
TL Ultralight TL-96 Star

The TL Ultralight TL-96 Star is a single-engine, side-by-side configuration two seat ultralight, designed in the Czech Republic in the 1990s. More than 150 have been registered.

== Design and development ==
The TL-96 Star is a single-engine, low wing monoplane seating two side by side under a prominent single-piece, forward-hinging canopy. A second, fixed transparency forms the rear of the cabin. The structure is all composite, a mixture of glass and carbon fibre reinforced plastics (CFRP). Its wings are unswept and have constant chord apart from a slight rounding of the leading edge at the tips; they carry plain inboard flaps. The one-piece, all-moving tailplane has a similar plan and is fitted with a central anti-balance tab. The fin and rudder are swept, the latter horn balanced. It has a tricycle undercarriage with faired wheels and cable brakes.

The Star can be powered by one of several flat four engines, including the 60 kW (80 hp) Rotax 912, the 86 kW (115 hp) Rotax 914 or the 67 kW (90 hp) Aero Prag AP-45. The Rotax engines drive three-blade propeller, the Aero Prag a two-blade wooden one.

The Star flew for the first time in November 1997 and had achieved German certification before 2000.

== Variants ==
TL-2000 StingCarbon (2002-2004)
An all CFRP version, introduced in 2002, that gained Czech certification. Its span was reduced by 760 mm (30 in) and length by 570 mm (22.4 in), though the empty weight increased by 10 kg (22 lbs).
TL 2000 RG (2003)
A retractable gear model with a cruise speed of 285 km/h (177 mph) that was announced before the first flight at Aero '03 in Friedrichshafen.
TL StingSport (2004-2006)
US SLSA model introduced in 2005
TL-2000 Sting S3 (2007 - 2009)
Announced at Sun'n'Fun 2007, Lakeland, Florida, succeeding the StingSport. This is a more advanced version of the StingSport with a new, tapered wing of greater span (9.11 m or 29 ft 11 in), area and aspect ratio and with larger flaps. 540 lbs useful load. Main Tank 21 gal, plus 2 wing tanks 6 gal ea. for a total of 32 gallons fuel. It has a higher level of instrumentation and a Rotax 912ULS engine. Speeds with 912ULS engine: Cruise 75% 115kn, Va: 118kn, Vr: 45kn, Vx: 50kn, Vy: 55kn, Vne: 164kn, Vso: 39kn@max gross. Climb Rates with Rotax 912ULS 1200+ fpm, w/single pilot, @max gross, 800+ fpm

TL-2000 Sting S4 (2010 - Present)
Model introduced in 2010 that is an improved version of the S3. It incorporates an improved canopy, redesigned instrument panel and cockpit, main landing gear, engine cowling, and tail surfaces. Standard engines available are the 80 hp (60 kW) Rotax 912UL, 100 hp (75 kW) Rotax 912ULS and 912iS, and the turbocharged 115 hp (86 kW) Rotax 914 four-stroke powerplants.
TL-2000 Sting S4 RG
Retractable gear version of the S4 with a maximum level speed of 285 km/h (154 kn). Standard engines available are the 100 hp (75 kW) Rotax 912ULS and 912iS, and the turbocharged 115 hp (86 kW) Rotax 914 four-stroke powerplants.

== Operational history ==
As of mid-2010, there were 202 TL-96 Stars and 153 TL-2000 Stings on European civil registers, excluding Russia.

== Accidents ==
On 25 July 2020, shortly after takeoff a TL-96 suffered a structural failure and crashed into a residential building near the city of Wesel in Western Germany, killing both aircraft occupants and one woman in the apartment that it impacted.

== Specifications (TL-96 Star, Rotax 912) ==
Data from Jane's All the World's Aircraft 2010-11

General characteristics

- Capacity: 2
- Length: 6.50 m (21 ft 4 in)
- Wingspan: 9.20 m (30 ft 2 in)
- Height: 2.15 m (7 ft 1 in)
- Wing area: 12.20 m^{2} (131.3 sq ft)
- Empty weight: 265 kg (584 lb)
- Gross weight: 450 kg (992 lb) limited by European ultralight category
- Fuel capacity: 50 L (11.0 Imp gal, 13.2 US gal)
- Powerplant: 1 × Rotax 912 UL-DCDI air/water-cooled flat four
- Propellers: 3-bladed Albastar, composite

Performance

- Maximum speed: 255 km/h (158 mph, 138 kn)
- Cruise speed: 220 km/h (140 mph, 120 kn) at 75% power
- Stall speed: 63 km/h (39 mph, 34 kn)
- Never exceed speed: 275 km/h (171 mph, 148 kn)
- Range: 1,000 km (620 mi, 540 nmi)
- Maximum glide ratio: 16:1 power off
- Rate of climb: 6.0 m/s (1,180 ft/min) max, at sea level
