= Aircraft Armament Equipment =

Equipment and parts for aircraft

Aircraft Armament Equipment (AAE), also known as Aircraft Armament Systems or Aircraft Ancillary Equipment, encompasses all equipment that is or can be attached either permanently or temporarily to an aircraft, the use of which allows for the carriage and release of airborne stores. AAE includes bomb racks for all practice and tactical, single and multiple weapon design configurations and their aircraft peculiar fairings; pylons and adapter hardware; missile launchers, including their related entities such as power supplies, nitrogen receivers, and aircraft peculiar pylons; adapters, rails, and interface components.

Most military aircraft, such as fixed-wing aircraft, helicopters and similar vehicles, are usually equipped with an external aircraft stores suspension and release system. External aircraft stores may include bombs, mines, missiles, rockets, torpedoes, detachable fuel tanks, flare and chaff dispensers, refueling or gun pods, ECM and ESM pods, thrust augmentation pods, towable target/decoy pods, and suspension equipment, such as drop launchers, eject launchers, racks, and pylons. These external stores are installed and detachable on the aircraft via specific suspension points, also called hardpoints or weapon stations, which are placed on the external body of the aircraft in order to provide the best possible location of the armament equipment, and for the most aerodynamic flight conditions.

Because it offers economies of scale, and because of advantages from an operational perspective, most military aircraft perform as multi-role platforms. This means that modern military aircraft are meant to be versatile, and are capable of executing a variety of military missions, including offensive counter air (OCA) and defensive counter air (DCA), an interceptor anti-aircraft (AA) role, close air support (CAS) as well as combat air patrol (CAP), deep strike, electronic warfare (EW), suppression of enemy air defenses (SEAD), anti-shipping (AS) and anti-submarine warfare (ASW), aerial refueling, aerial reconnaissance, aerial surveillance, Unmanned Aerial Vehicle (UAV) launch, or any combination of these roles. Each mission requires the assignment of the right weapon pairing for the given role. Weapon pairing simply means the delivery of the right store or a mix of different store loads and types for the mission. The wide variety of different mission types required from modern military aircraft enforces the need of carrying a wide selection of loads and stores.

== Types of stores ==
Bomb racks are aircraft equipment which suspends, carries, and releases ordnance from the military aircraft. A majority of bomb racks are installed semi-permanently on a vehicle, and are designated parent racks. Most bomb racks are categorized as either ejection racks or free-fall racks. A free-fall bomb rack releases the ordnance with the help of gravity from the rack when requirements for launch have been met, while an ejector-type bomb rack releases its payload by firing a cartridge-actuated device to eject the ordnance.

High speed attack and fighter aircraft are capable of creating a vacuum condition under the aircraft body. This condition can mean that a free-fall ordnance does not fall toward the target, but may stay in contact with the aircraft, causing damage or the total loss of the vehicle. Ejector racks eject the store from the bomb racks with enough force to overcome the vacuum condition and to launch the weapon safely.

Guided missile launchers, such as the LAU-127 missile rail launcher, carry and release guided missiles from a military aerial vehicle. These launchers are classified as either ejection- or rail-type launchers. Ejection type launchers use cartridge-generated gas pressure fired in the launcher breech to separate the weapon from the vehicle. The missile motor is then set off at a safe distance underneath the aircraft. Rail-type launchers are usually attached to the wing hard points. Rail-type launchers make it possible o activate the missile motor while the weapon is still connected to the store. After the motor fires, the thrust generated overpowers the weapon restraining device, and the missile is launched from the aircraft. A tube-type launcher is a variation of the rail-type launcher. Tube-type missile launchers hold missile in launch tubes until the missile motor is set off. The weapon then releases from the tube similar to the firing of aircraft-mounted rockets.

== Configurations ==
Today's multi-role aerial vehicles possess hard points to enable them to carry the changeable selection of stores necessary carry out a selection of different mission types. Even though different aircraft types may have different numbers of available hard points, the usual count is eight to twelve stations. Since weapon station attachments need to be maximized for best operation, hard points are usually found on the lower surface of the aircraft. Adding attachments to the otherwise smooth aircraft body does necessarily increase aerodynamic drag, which results in negative effects on flight performance in terms of lower airspeed, maneuverability, and range, as well as increased fuel usage, amongst other effects. Common hard point locations are on the wings, be it wing tip, inner, middle, or outer wing hard points, or on the side or center of the fuselage. The type of aircraft then further drives the possible options in terms of stores loading. The combination of loads and stores for each mission is usually called the external stores configuration.

To illustrate, a possible stores configuration could feature external fuel tanks underneath the aircraft fuselage, short-range missiles on the side of the body, Electronic Counter Measures pods on the inside wing weapon stations, bombs on the middle of the wings, rocket launch pods on the outside, and medium-range missiles on the wing tip weapon stations. The possible stores configurations is necessarily limited by the possible hard points loading options for each weapon stations.

== U.S Navy AAE Categories ==
The two categories of AAE specific to the United States Navy are as follows:

- Aircraft Inventory Material: Aircraft inventory items are semi-permanently attached to an aircraft and are transferred with the aircraft from one command to the next. Examples of aircraft inventory material include bomb racks, guided missile launchers, and pylons/fairings, the removal of which could affect the structural or aerodynamic integrity of the aircraft. The items are generally called parent racks and pylons.
- Mission-Oriented Material. Mission-oriented material includes those AAE items and the accessory suspension equipment that are assigned to and maintained by Intermediate level Maintenance Activities (IMA). Mission-oriented material is maintained by IMAs to satisfy the specific organizational mission requirements. Upon completion of the mission, mission-oriented material is returned to the IMA, which performs any necessary maintenance actions or reconfiguration to satisfy the next mission requirement. During periods of extended operations, material may remain in custody of organizational levels until an inspection is due or the item fails to function properly. Mission-oriented material is generally issued to organizational level users with store or stores attached (preloaded).
  - Intermediate level Maintenance Activity (IMA) is maintenance which is normally performed by navy personnel on repair ships, aircraft carriers, fleet support bases and Shore Intermediate Maintenance Activities (SIMAs).

== U.S. Armed Forces Research, Development, and Acquisition (RDA) activities ==
=== United States Navy and Marine Corps ===
For United States Navy and United States Marine Corps aviation, the Naval Air Systems Command is responsible for Research, Development, and Acquisition (RDA) activities. Specifically, the Program Executive Office, Unmanned Aviation and Strike Weapons (PEO(U&W)), which reports to the Assistant Secretary of the Navy (Research, Development and Acquisition), oversees Program PMA-201 for Precision Strike Weapons, which includes RDA activities for aircraft armament equipment.

=== United States Air Force ===
For the United States Air Force, the Air Force Materiel Command is responsible for all Air Force RDA activities. Aircraft Armament Systems (instead of Equipment) is managed by the Armaments Directorate, which is part of the Air Force Life Cycle Management Center (AFLCMC), which reports to the Assistant Secretary of the Air Force (Acquisition, Technology and Logistics). The responsible Program Executive Office Weapons also reports into the AFLCMC.

=== United States Army ===
For the United States Army, the United States Army Materiel Command is responsible for all Army RDA activities. Army Aviation-related equipment and systems are managed by the U.S. Army Acquisition Support Center (USAASC), which reports to the United States Assistant Secretary of the Army for Acquisition, Logistics, and Technology. The responsible Program Executive Office Aviation also reports into the USAASC.

== See also ==
- Index of aviation articles
- Bomb bay
- Hardpoint
- LAU-127
- Aircraft stores configuration for the Boeing F/A-18E/F Super Hornet
