= Saab 105 =

Military training aircraft

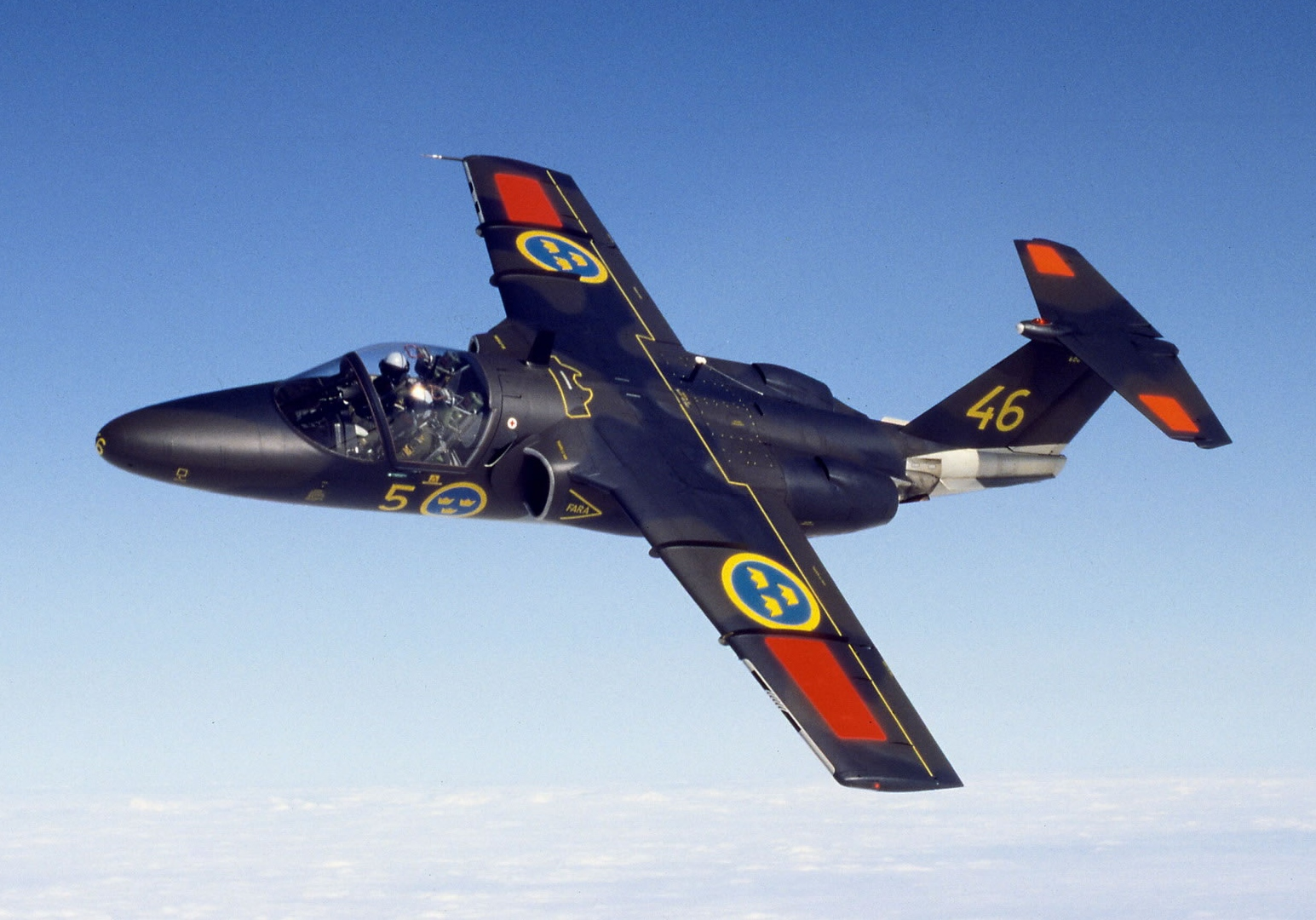
- A Swedish Air Force Saab 105 in flight

General information
- Type: Jet trainer and light attack aircraft
- National origin: Sweden
- Manufacturer: Saab AB
- Status: retired in military service, Active in Swedish Air Force Historic Flight
- Primary users: Swedish Air Force (historical) Austrian Air Force (historical)
- Number built: 192

History
- Manufactured: 1963–1972
- Introduction date: 17 July 1967
- First flight: 29 June 1963
- Retired: Austrian Air Force (31 December 2020) Swedish Air Force (18 June 2024)

The Saab 105 is a Swedish high-wing, twinjet trainer aircraft developed in the early 1960s as a private venture by Saab AB. The Swedish Air Force, which had opted to procure the type for various roles, designated the aircraft SK 60. The SK 60 entered service in 1967, replacing the ageing De Havilland Vampire fleet.

The Swedish Air Force bought 150 aircraft and another 40 were exported to Austria, designated Saab 105Ö. The Saab 105 was the aircraft used by Swedish Air Force display team Team 60 and was formerly used by two display teams of the Austrian Air Force, "Karo As" and "Silver Birds".

== Development ==
In 1959, development of the Saab 105 was initiated by Saab. The company decided to develop the aircraft as a private venture and intended for it to serve in a wide variety of military and civil capacities. In a military capacity, the 105 can be operated as a jet trainer, conduct aerial reconnaissance and ground attack, and in a limited interceptor capability. Among the diverse roles planned for the aircraft, Saab proposed a four-to-five seat business jet cabin configuration which was intended for corporate customers.

At the time, the 105 was one of the only small European aircraft to be equipped with a turbofan engine, which was reported as of interest to prospective business customers. The 105 was intended to launch Saab into the business jet market. Ultimately no such customers emerged for the type and thus Saab elected to focus its interest upon military customers instead.

Early on, the Swedish Air Force had formed a commitment with Saab that, contingent upon satisfactory performance of the prototype during flight testing, an order for at least 100 aircraft would be placed. In December 1961, the Swedish Government authorized the Swedish Air Force to sponsor the development and manufacture of a single prototype Saab 105 in a training configuration. On 29 June 1963, this first prototype conducted its maiden flight. The flight test program soon revealed the type's good handling qualities and capability of performing aerobatic maneuvers. In March 1965, a single prototype was dispatched to Turbomeca's facilities in Pau, Pyrénées-Atlantiques, Aquitaine, France, for further flight testing of its Turbomeca Aubisque powerplant.

On 6 March 1965, the Swedish Air Force received authorisation from the Swedish Government to place an order for an initial quantity of 130 Saab 105 aircraft. The Swedish aircraft were divided into three principal variants, these being the SK 60A for training and liaison duties using a four-seat configuration, the SK 60B for light attack missions in a twin side-by-side seating configuration, and the SK 60C dual-role attack and reconnaissance aircraft, for the latter role equipped with various cameras in the aircraft's nose.

An improved version, designated as the Saab 105Ö, was procured by Austria as a lightweight multi-role aircraft, with the intention to deploy them in trainer, reconnaissance, interception and ground attack roles. To meet the requirements specified by the Austrian Air Force, the 105Ö features several key differences, which includes some avionics changes, the adoption of a strengthened wing for carrying greater quantities of munitions and equipment upon the underwing hardpoints, and a more powerful version of the Turbomeca Aubisque powerplant, providing superior performance when operated from air bases at high altitude.

== Design ==
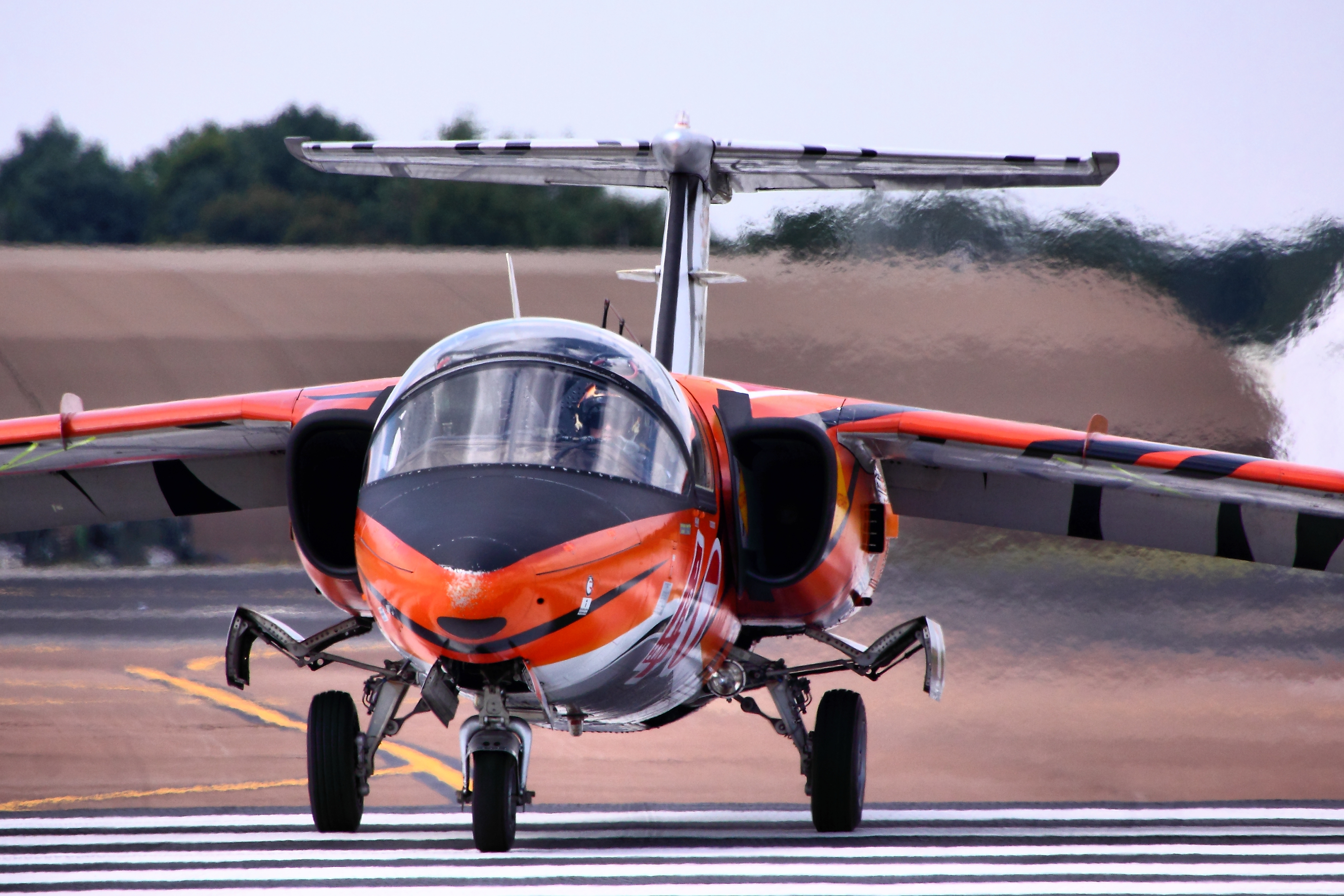
A Saab 105 taxiing at the 2011 Royal International Air Tattoo (RIAT)

The Saab 105 was developed to function as a small and inexpensive multirole aircraft, which has been most typically used in a training capacity. It is an all-metal twin-jet aircraft with a pressurized cabin. It features a T-tail configuration, modestly swept wings, and a pair of engines mounted on either side of the fuselage just underneath the wing.

The 105 can be outfitted with various armaments and equipment to perform a wide range of duties, mostly installed upon the aircraft's six underwing hardpoints. In a ground-attack/close air support capacity, the 105 can employ a combination of 135 mm, 127 mm, and 75 mm unguided rockets, air-to-ground missiles and assorted bombs, including napalm bombs. A pair of 30 mm cannon or 7.62 mm guns may be installed via gun pods.

In the air defense role, AIM-9 Sidewinder air-to-air missiles can be employed in addition to the cannons. For the purpose of carrying a maximum of two passengers, smaller ejector seats can be installed for the pilot and co-pilot, while a small bench directly behind them can be used by passengers. Generic and more specialized surveillance/reconnaissance missions can be performed by the Saab 105, having the option of being fitted with radiation detection equipment for atmospheric sampling. With suitable equipment, the 105 could be readily converted between trainer and light attack roles.

As built, the Saab 105 was typically powered by a pair of Turbomeca Aubisque low-bypass turbofan engines, licence-manufactured by Volvo Flygmotor as the RM9. The Aubisque engine reportedly provided favourable engine-out characteristics, allowing the aircraft to successfully takeoff in the event of a single engine failing at the critical point. This has not been the sole powerplant for the type, as a number of 105 aircraft have been powered by the General Electric J85 engine instead. Swedish Air Force aircraft were remanufactured during the 1990s to use the newer Williams International FJ44, which was designated as the RM15.

== Operational history ==
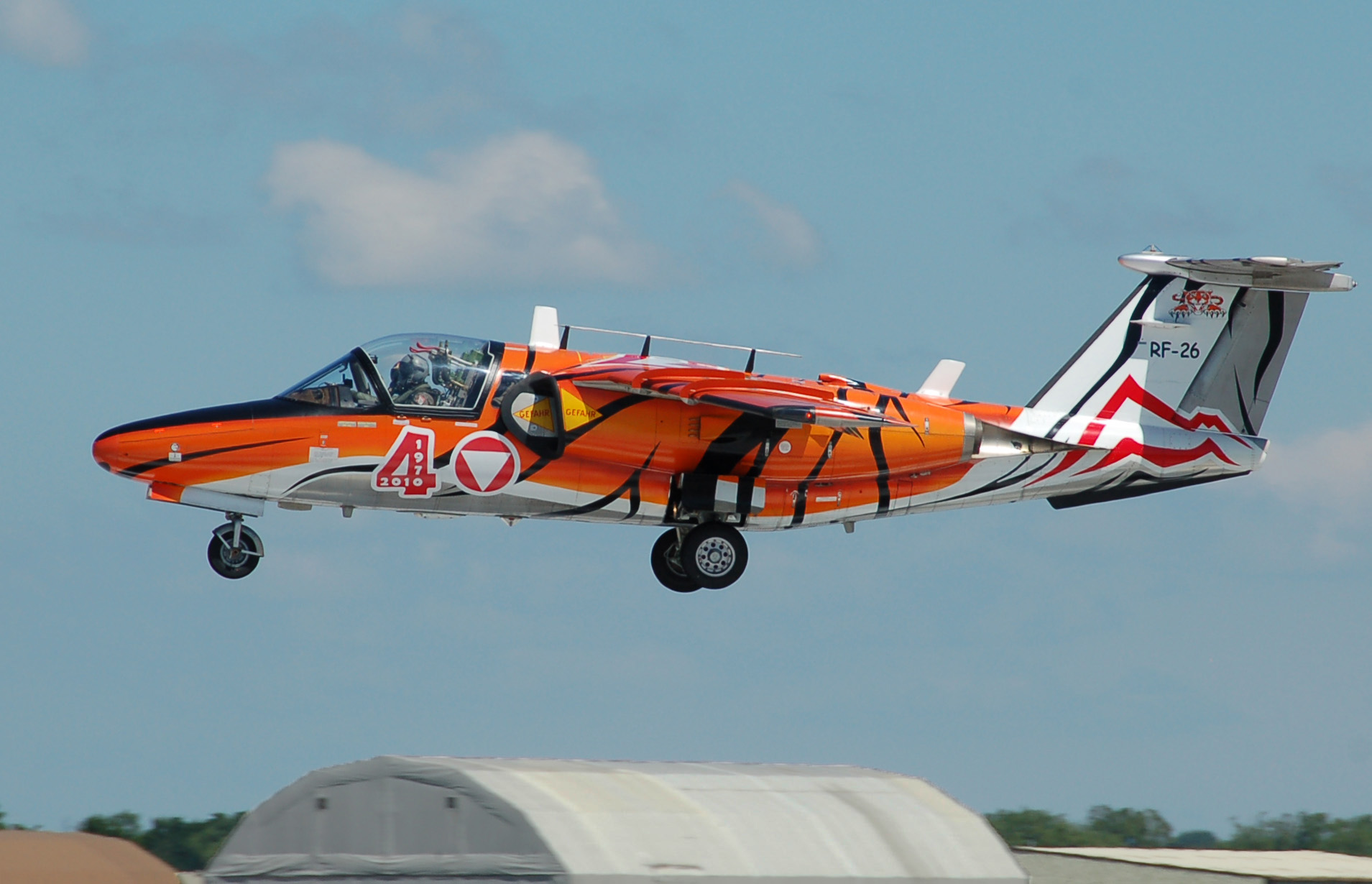
An Austrian Air Force Saab 105Ö arrives for the 2014 Royal International Air Tattoo, England. The colour scheme commemorates 40 years of use by the Austrian Air Force

In July 1967, the first Swedish Air Force student pilots started training on the Saab 105. In July 1970, Austrian Air Force pilot training activities on the type began. In August 2010, 22 of Austria's Saab 105 aircraft remained operational, attaining a combined total flight time of roughly 1,500 flying hours per year.

During the 1990s, by which point the existing engines of the Swedish Air Force's SK 60 fleet were considered to be towards the end of their technical and economic lifespan, it was decided to replace the Turbomeca Aubisque engines with newly built Williams International FJ44 engines, which are lighter and less costly to operate. In November 1993, a contract was signed for the re-engining of 115 aircraft. The number of aircraft to be upgraded was subsequently reduced as a result of cuts to the defence budget. The replacement was performed as a low-cost measure to fulfill the Swedish Air Force's continuing requirement for a primary trainer aircraft. In September 1996, the first of these upgraded aircraft, which was redesignated as the SK 60W, was re-delivered to the Swedish Air Force.

In June 2007, Saab signed a long term service agreement with the Austrian Air Force to provide logistics and technical support for their Saab 105Ö fleet for a further 10–15 years. Austria retired the Saab 105 in December 2020. In December 2008, Saab received a SKr 900 million ($115 million) contract to support extended operations of Sweden's 105 trainer fleet up to mid-2017. In September 2009, a SKr 130 million ($18.8 million) contract to deliver a package of cockpit and system upgrades for the SK 60 aircraft was signed. One goal of this modernisation was increased compatibility with the Saab JAS 39 Gripen, the primary combat aircraft of the Swedish Air Force.

In October 2009, Saab proposed replacing the Swedish Air Force's SK 60 trainers with the Embraer Super Tucano. In March 2014, the Swedish Air Force publicly acknowledged that it was to begin studying replacement options for the Saab 105. Major General Micael Bydén observed that multinational training opportunities were being examined and that prospective replacement aircraft included the Alenia Aermacchi M-346, BAE Systems Hawk and Pilatus PC-21. In March 2014, Saab and Pilatus Aircraft signed a memorandum of understanding to offer the PC-21 to the Swedish Air Force.

In April 2015, a request for information (RFI) was issued by the Defence Materiel Administration (FMV) for a new Military Flying Training System, to provide long term basic and advanced training fleet functions. The advanced trainer requirements specify the presence of an embedded training capability, including simulated radar and weapons use, as well as tactical displays in both cockpit positions resembling fourth and fifth-generation jet fighter aircraft.

In 2020, Saab signed a new service agreement with the Swedish Armed Forces to provide support for the Saab 105 to 2025, with one year option to 2026. However, the type was officially retired 18 June 2024.

In May 2021, the Grob G 120TP was chosen as the new basic trainer for the Swedish Air force, with first airplanes to be operational in 2023. The Saab Gripen will take on the advanced pilot training.

== Variants ==
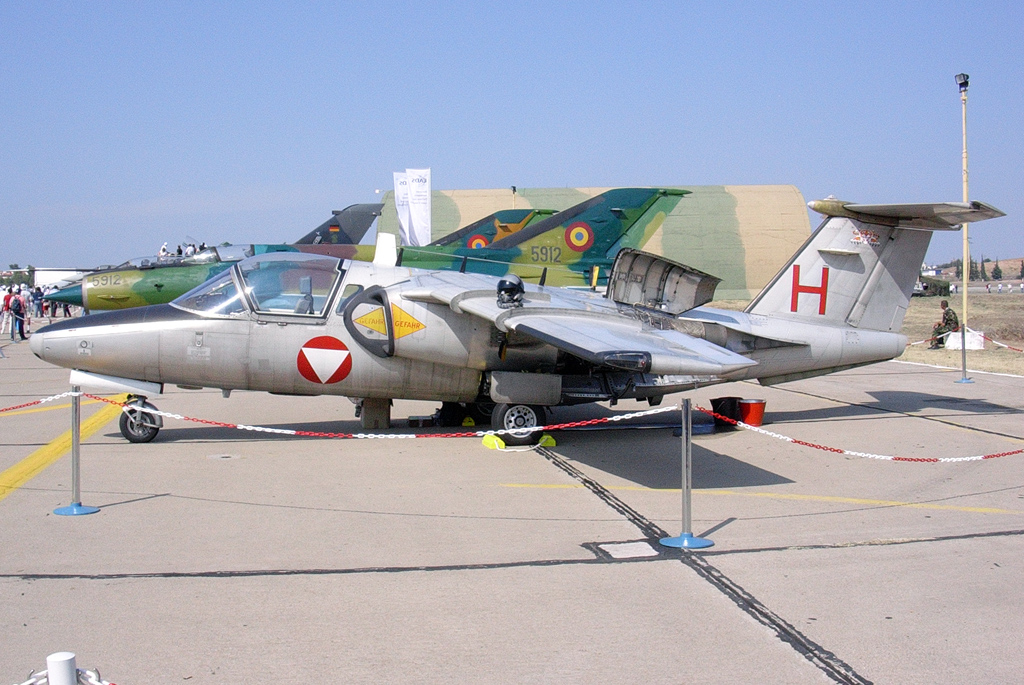
A Saab 105Ö "H" of the Austrian Air Force, at the Archangelos International Air show, Tanagra AFB-LGTG, Greece

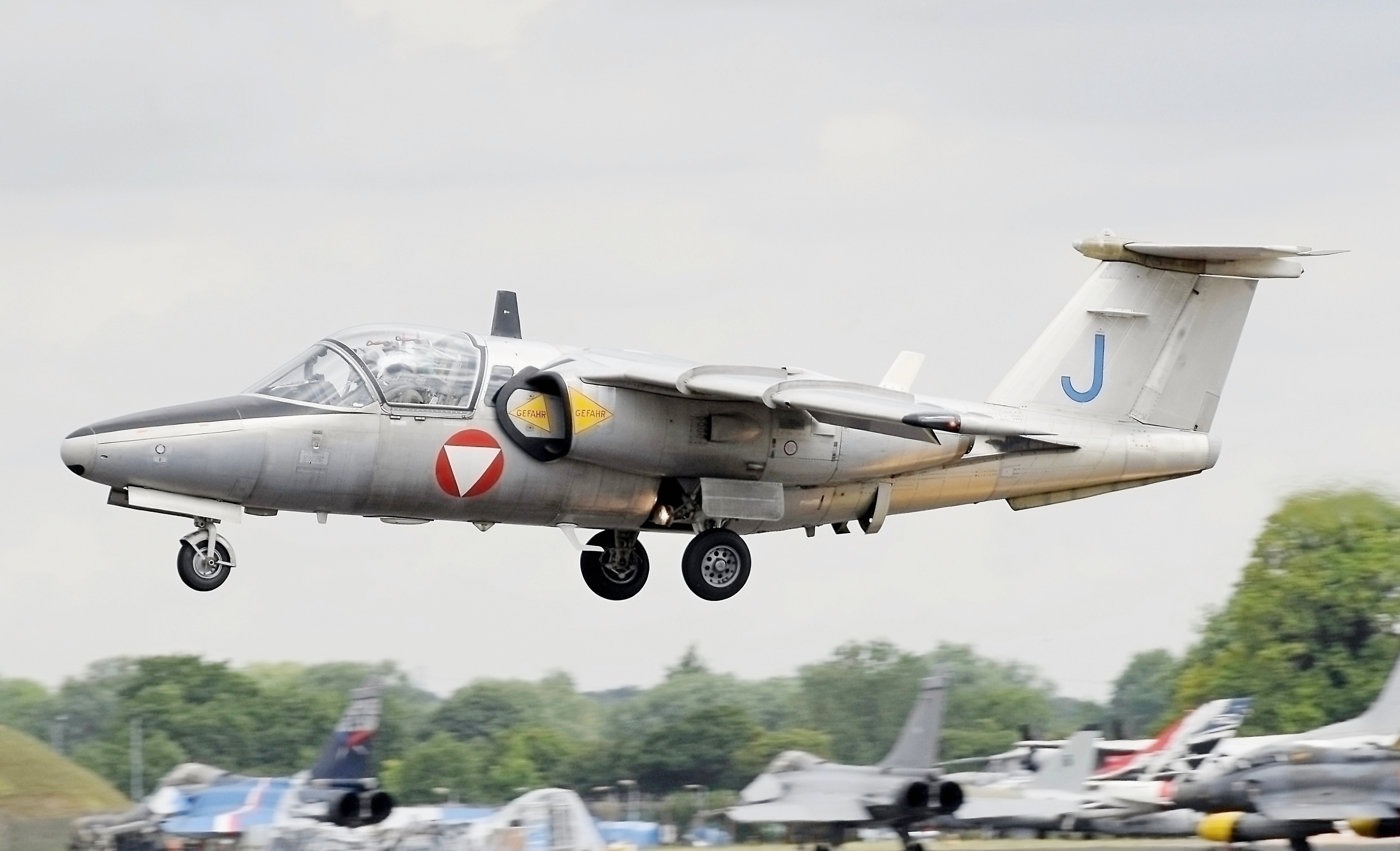
A Saab 105Ö "J" of the Austrian Air Force at the 2017 RIAT at RAF Fairford

Saab 105
Prototype. Two built.
SK 60A
Two-seat jet trainer, liaison aircraft for the Swedish Air Force. 149 built as SK 60A.
SK 60B
Two-seat attack version for the Swedish Air Force, modified from SK 60A with new weapons sight.
SK 60C
Two-seat ground attack/reconnaissance version for the Swedish Air Force with extended camera nose. One new-build prototype and 29 conversions from SK 60A.
SK 60D
Saab had also designed the Saab 105 for use as a four-seat liaison transport: the two ejection seats could be removed and quickly replaced with four airline-type seats, with no provision for wearing a parachute, or four more austere seats that allowed the wearing of parachutes. In the mid-1970s, ten SK 60A aircraft were permanently configured as transports and given the designation of "SK 60D". Some were painted in the light green/dark green/tan "splinter" camouflage associated with the Saab Viggen fighter.
SK 60E
This variant was a similar four-seat SK 60A conversion, but featured commercial-type instruments, including an instrument landing system. It was used to help train Flygvapnet reserve pilots in flying commercial aircraft. The SK 60E machines were eventually used as SK 60D liaison transports.
SK 60W
In 1993, another upgrade program was initiated to modernize the SK 60, the most important improvement being fit of twin Williams Rolls FJ44 turbofans with 8.45 kN (861 kgp/1,900 lbf) each and digital engine controls. The new engines provide more thrust, and are quieter, cleaner, and easier to maintain. The first Williams-powered SK 60—known informally as the "SK 60(W)"—performed its initial flight in August 1995. About 115 conversions of SK 60A, 60B, and 60C aircraft were performed in the late 1990s. No conversions were performed of the SK 60D/E, with all such aircraft grounded and used as spares hulks.
Saab 105XT
Export demonstrator. An improved version of the SK 60B, re-engined with 12.68 kN (2,850 lbf) General Electric J85 turbojets. Prototype converted from second Saab 105 prototype.
Saab 105D
A refined business jet variant was considered, but the idea was out of date and there were no takers.
Saab 105G
Revised version of 105XT with new avionics, including precision nav/attack system, more powerful J85 engines and modified wing. One converted from 105 XT prototype.
Saab 105H
Proposed version for the Swiss Air Force. Never built.
Saab 105Ö
Variant of the 105XT for the Austrian Air Force, first delivered to Austria in July 1970. 40 built, delivered 1970–72, replacing the de Havilland Vampire and Saab 29 Tunnan.
Saab 105S
In the mid-1970s, Saab proposed yet another demonstrator, the "Saab 105S" for a Finnish trainer requirement, but the Finns decided to buy the BAe Hawk instead.

== Operators ==
Sweden

- Swedish Air Force Historic Flight: 1, SE-DXG.

=== Former operators ===
Sweden

- Swedish Air Force: 150. All retired on 18 June 2024 after 57 years of service

Austria

- Austrian Air Force: 40. All retired in December 2020 after 50 years of service

== Specifications (Saab 105Ö) ==
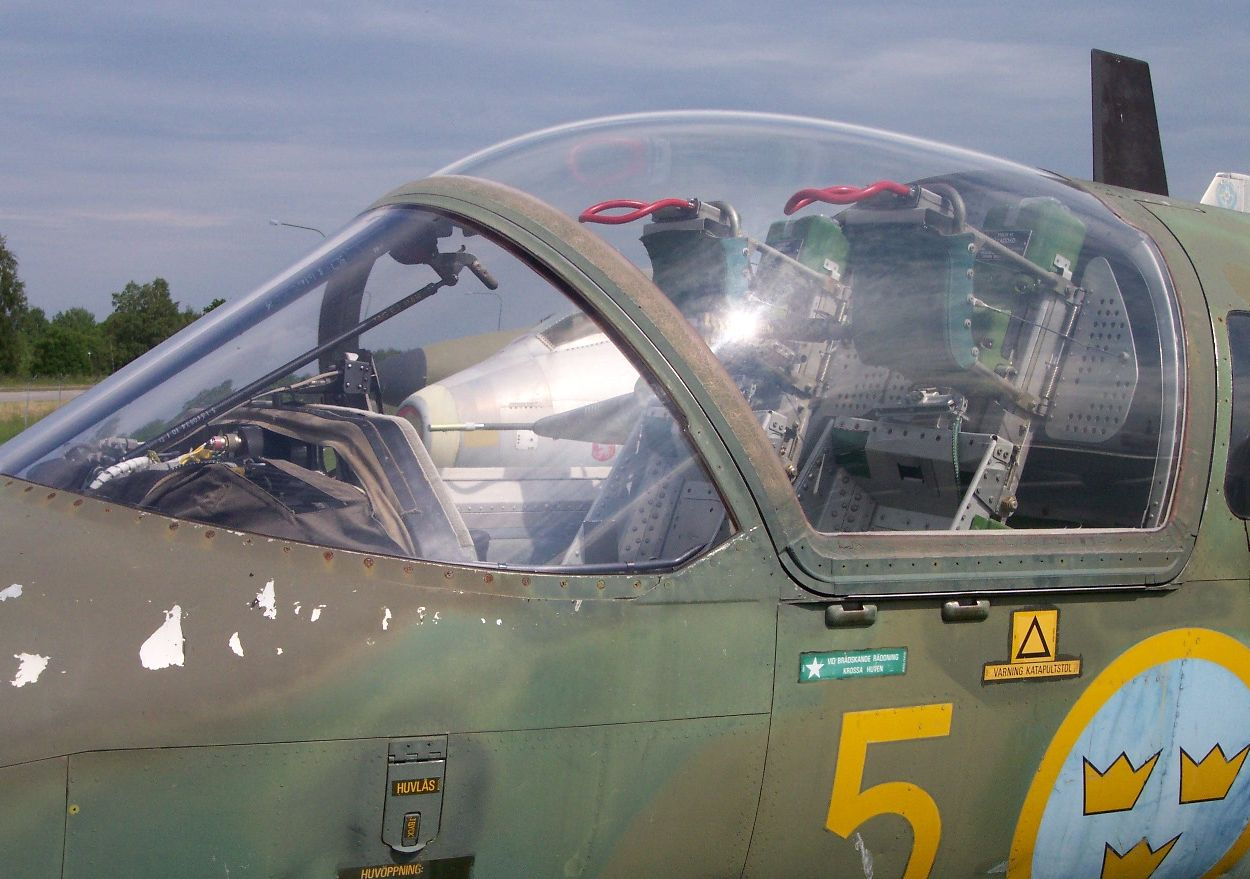
The cockpit of a Saab 105 on static display

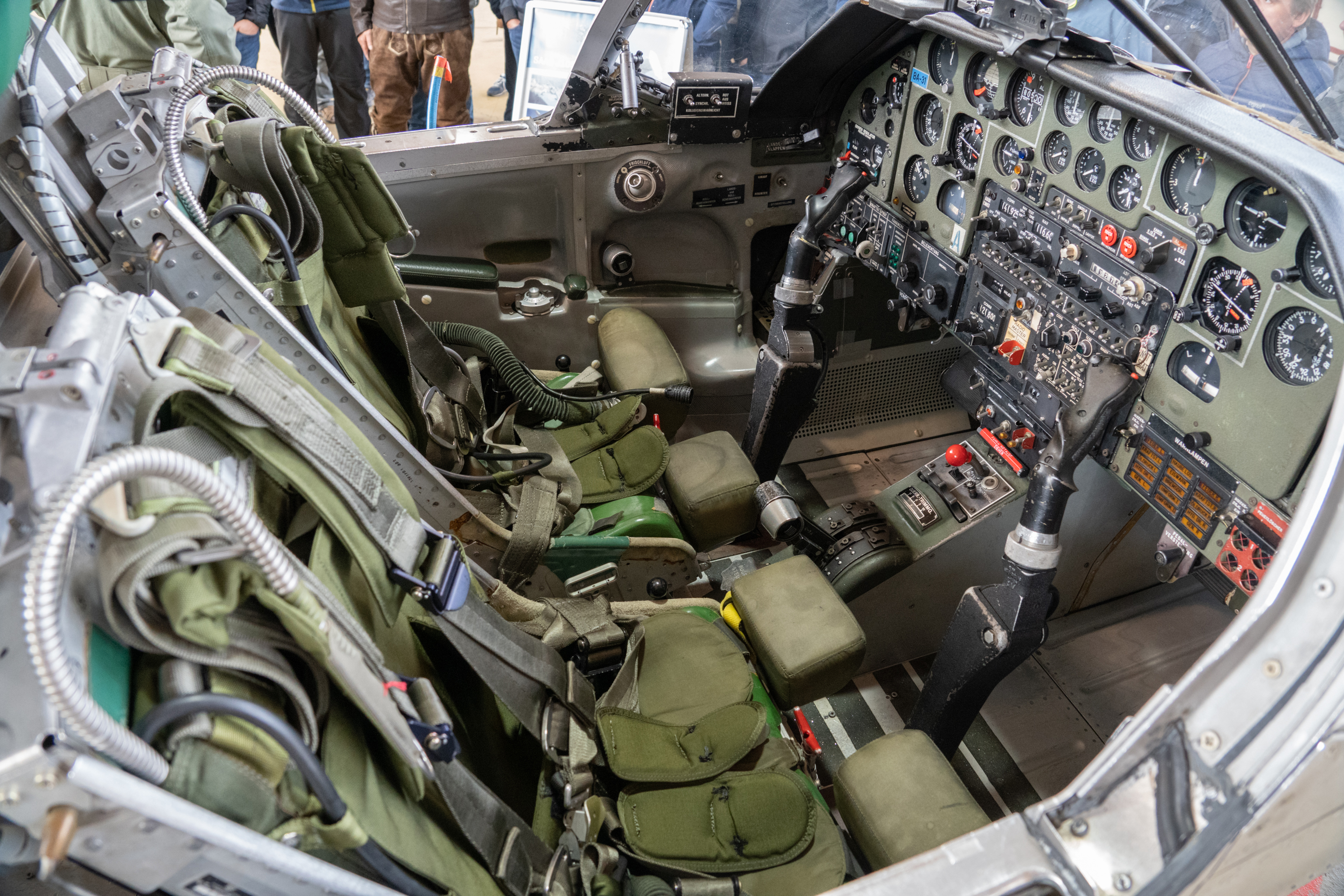
The cockpit of a Saab 105

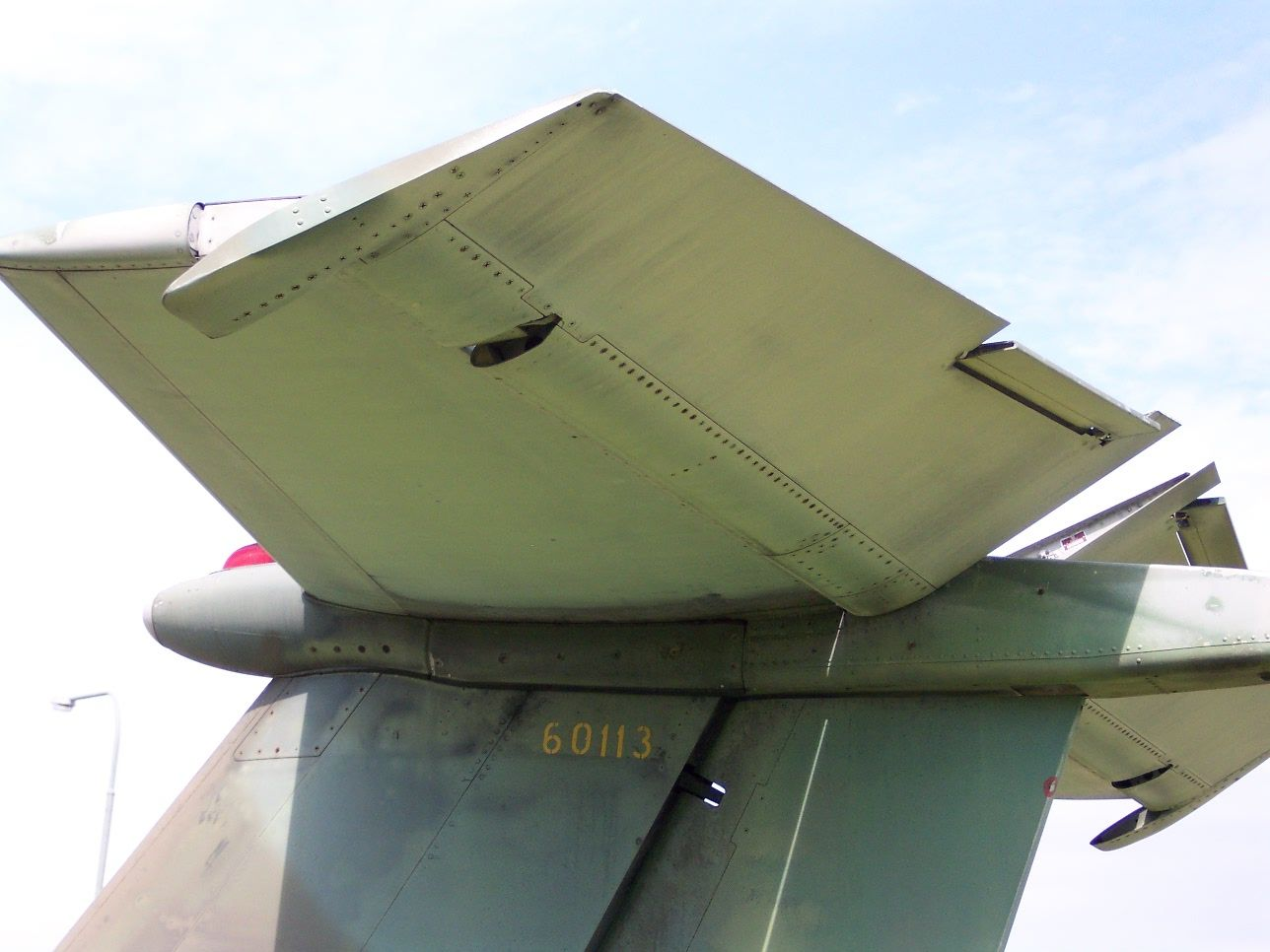
The T-tail of a 105

Data from Jane's Civil and Military Aircraft Upgrades 1994–95

General characteristics

- Crew: 2
- Length: 10.8 m (35 ft 5 in)
- Wingspan: 9.5 m (31 ft 2 in)
- Height: 2.7 m (8 ft 10 in)
- Wing area: 16.3 m^{2} (175 sq ft)
- Airfoil: root 10.3%; tip: 12%
- Empty weight: 2,849 kg (6,281 lb)
- Max takeoff weight: 4,635 kg (10,218 lb)
- Powerplant: 2 × General Electric J85-17B turbojets, 12.68 kN (2,850 lbf) thrust each

Performance

- Maximum speed: 970 km/h (600 mph, 520 kn) at sea level
- Ferry range: 2,300 km (1,400 mi, 1,200 nmi)
- Service ceiling: 13,700 m (44,900 ft)
- Rate of climb: 70 m/s (14,000 ft/min)

Armament

- Hardpoints: 6 hardpoints, AAMs, ASMs, gun pods, bombs, rockets

== See also ==
Aircraft of comparable role, configuration, and era

- BAC Jet Provost
- Canadair CT-114 Tutor
- Cessna A-37 Dragonfly
- Cessna T-37 Tweet
- Fairchild T-46
- Folland Gnat
- Fouga CM.170 Magister
- HAL Kiran
- Temco TT Pinto
