= Team 60 =

Swedish Air Force aerobatic demonstration team

- Team 60 emblem
- Active: 1974 – present
- Country: Sweden
- Branch: Swedish Air Force
- Role: Aerobatic flight display team
- Size: 6 Aircraft
- Base: Ljungbyhed AFB
- Colours: Grey

Aircraft flown
- Trainer: SK 60

Team 60 is the aerobatic demonstration team of the Swedish Air Force.

The team, at the time still unnamed, was formed in 1974 as a group of 4 SK 60 (Swedish Air Force designation for the SAAB 105) from the Air Force Central Flying School at Ljungbyhed Air Base in southern Sweden. The year after another two airplanes were added, and in spring of 1976 the first display under the new name Team 60 was flown in Gothenburg.

The unofficial name of the group while they were based at Ljungbyhed AB was "En sexa Skåne", which translate to "six centilitres of Scania Akvavit" in English. Ljungbyhed AFB is situated in the county of Skåne (Scania in English) and Skåne is also a popular kind of Akvavit at the typical Scanian Smorgasbord. There are six airplanes in the group and 6cl is a typical Swedish snaps. The group also terminated some of their shows by doing a snaps glass with smoke in the air.

Although occasionally being reduced to four, the team flies with six airplanes based at Malmen Airbase near Linköping.

Unlike some other air force display teams, the team members are not full-time display pilots but in most cases senior flight instructors from the Swedish Air Force.
