= Tandem =

Arrangement, one in front of the other

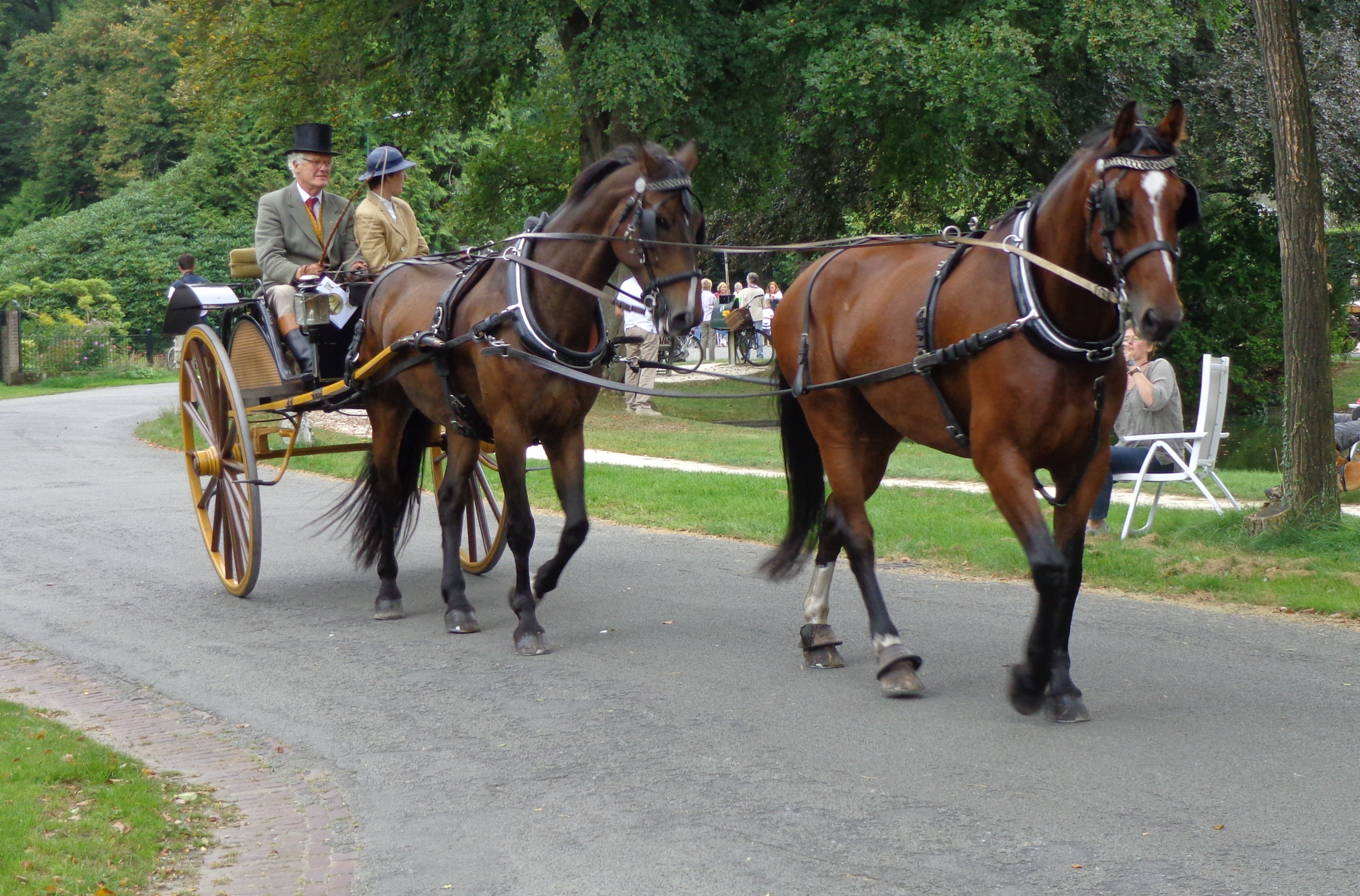
Horses hitched in tandem pulling a carriage

Tandem, or in tandem, is an arrangement in which two or more animals, machines, or people are lined up one behind another, all facing in the same direction. Tandem can also be used more generally to refer to any group of persons or objects working together, not necessarily in line.

The English word tandem derives from the Latin adverb tandem, meaning at length or finally. It is a word play, using the Latin phrase (referring to time, not position) for English "at length, lengthwise".

== Horse driving ==
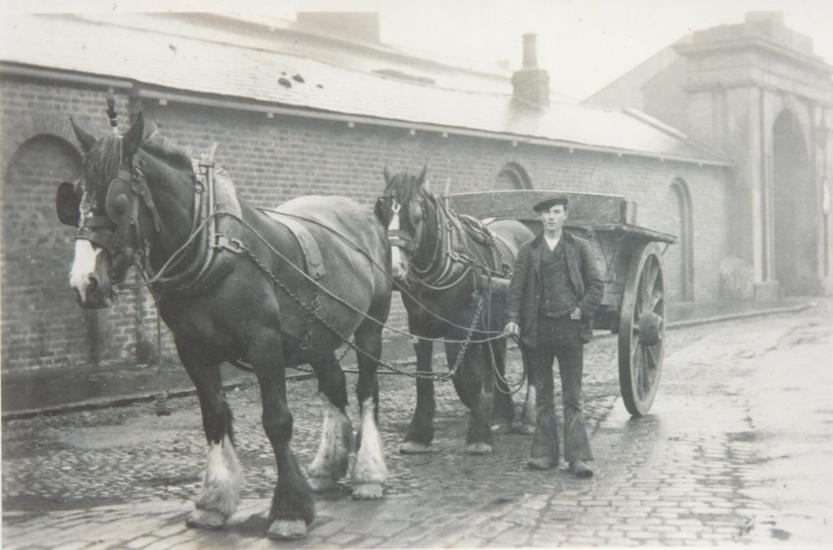
Draft horses chain-hitched in tandem; carter standing in usual position beside rear horse

When driving horses, tandem refers to one horse harnessed in front of another to pull a load or vehicle. A tandem arrangement provides more pulling power than a single horse, such as for pulling a heavy load up a steep hill, out of heavy mud or snow, or pulling heavy loads on narrow tracks or through narrow gates and doorways (too wide for a pair of horses side-by-side). For example, a Brewer's van fully loaded with 25 barrels might weigh 8 tons, requiring 2 or 3 horses.

In carting, when pulling heavy loads with tandem harness, the carter walks to the left of the shaft horse holding its left rein with his right hand, and holding the reins of the lead horse in his left hand.

The harness for the leader (front horse) is slightly different from that for the wheeler (rear horse). For instance, the leader doesn't have shafts, so shaft holders are not needed, but often there are straps to support the traces (pulling straps) from sagging too low. Any straps running across the back of the leader should be sewn or use special buckles which don't leave a loose tab that might catch a rein in it. In carriage driving, the driver should carry a whip long enough to reach the shoulder of the leader.

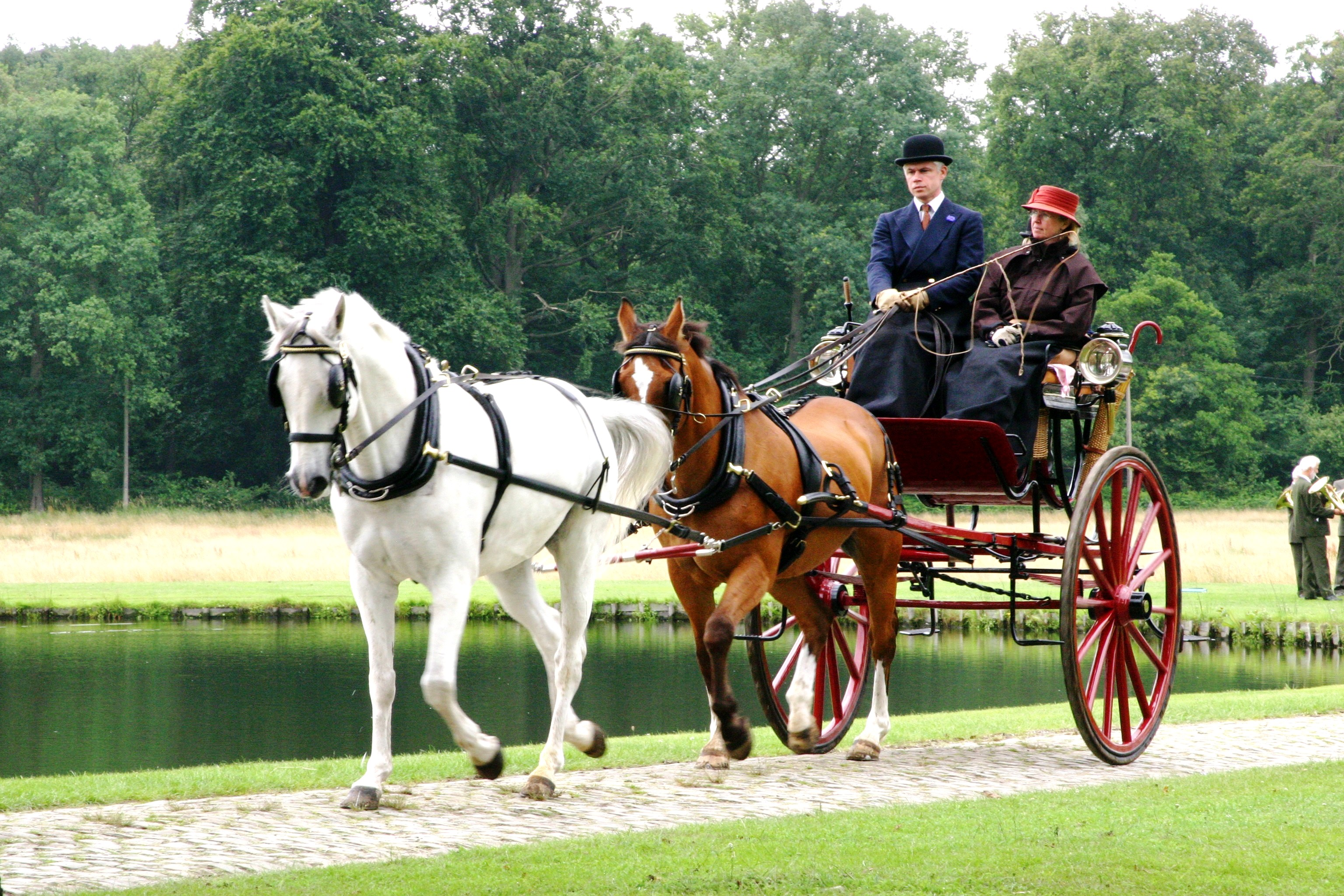
The driver sits high enough to see over the leader and is carrying a whip long enough to reach the lead horse's shoulder

A tandem cart is constructed in the style of a dogcart and used mainly for show, and should be tall enough for the driver to look over the head of the lead horse. A drayel is hardware at the tip of the shafts to attach the traces (pulling straps) from the front horse. Alternative to using a drayel, the leader's traces are hooked or buckled into the forward end of the wheeler's traces.

Driving a tandem is challenging and led to the creation of tandem driving clubs and matches in the 19th century.

The art of tandem driving requires an alert brain and sensitive fingers. It has been compared with playing a harp. It is, in many ways, more difficult than driving a team [of four horses]. Whereas the leaders of a team balance one another and keep each other straight, there is nothing other than the skill of the Whip (driver) to prevent a tandem leader from turning to face his driver.

— Sallie Walrond

Three horses in a row is sometimes called a randem/random or trandem/trandom.

== Bicycles ==
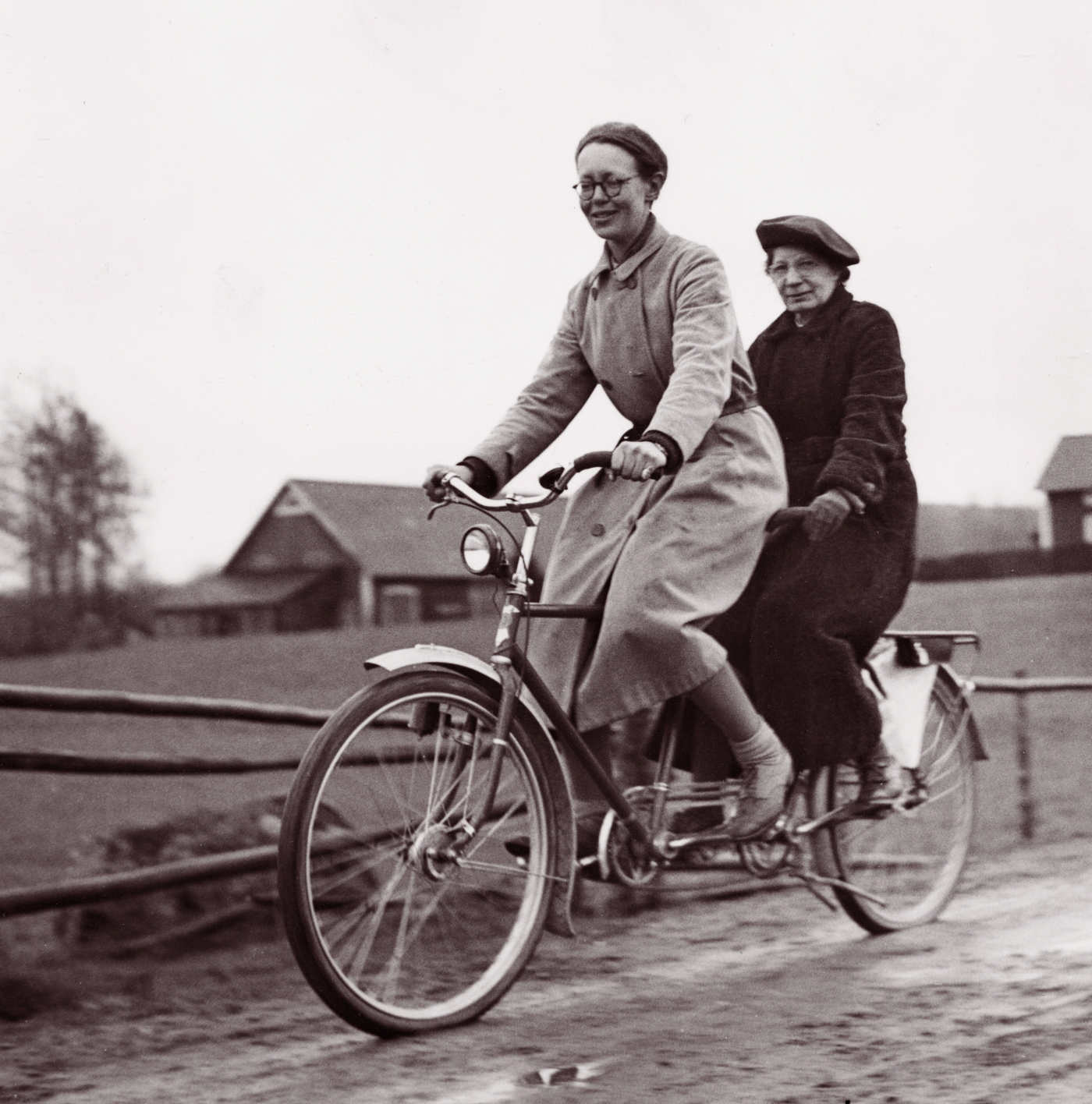
Tandem bicycle

Tandem bicycles are named for their tandem seating, a more common arrangement than side-by-side "sociable" seating. Tandem bikes are also used in road racing, track racing, and para-cycling.

== Motor vehicles ==
The Messerschmitt KR200 was an example of a very small automobile that used tandem seating; one passenger behind the driver.

Tandem parking means parking one car in front of the other.

The word tandem is also used to indicate a semi-trailer truck pulling more than one trailer.

Tandem axles means one axle mounted closely in front of another. For trailers, the purpose is to bear heavier loads than a single axle provides.

In heavy trucks, tandem refers to two closely spaced axles. Legally defined by the distance between the axles (up to 2.5 m (8 ft 2 3/8 in) in the European Union, 40–96 inches (1.02–2.44 m) in the United States), mechanically there are many configurations. Either or both axles may be powered, and often interact with each other. In the United States, both axles are typically powered and equalized; in the European Union, one axle is typically unpowered, and can often be adjusted to load, and even raised off the ground, turning a tandem into a single-axle.

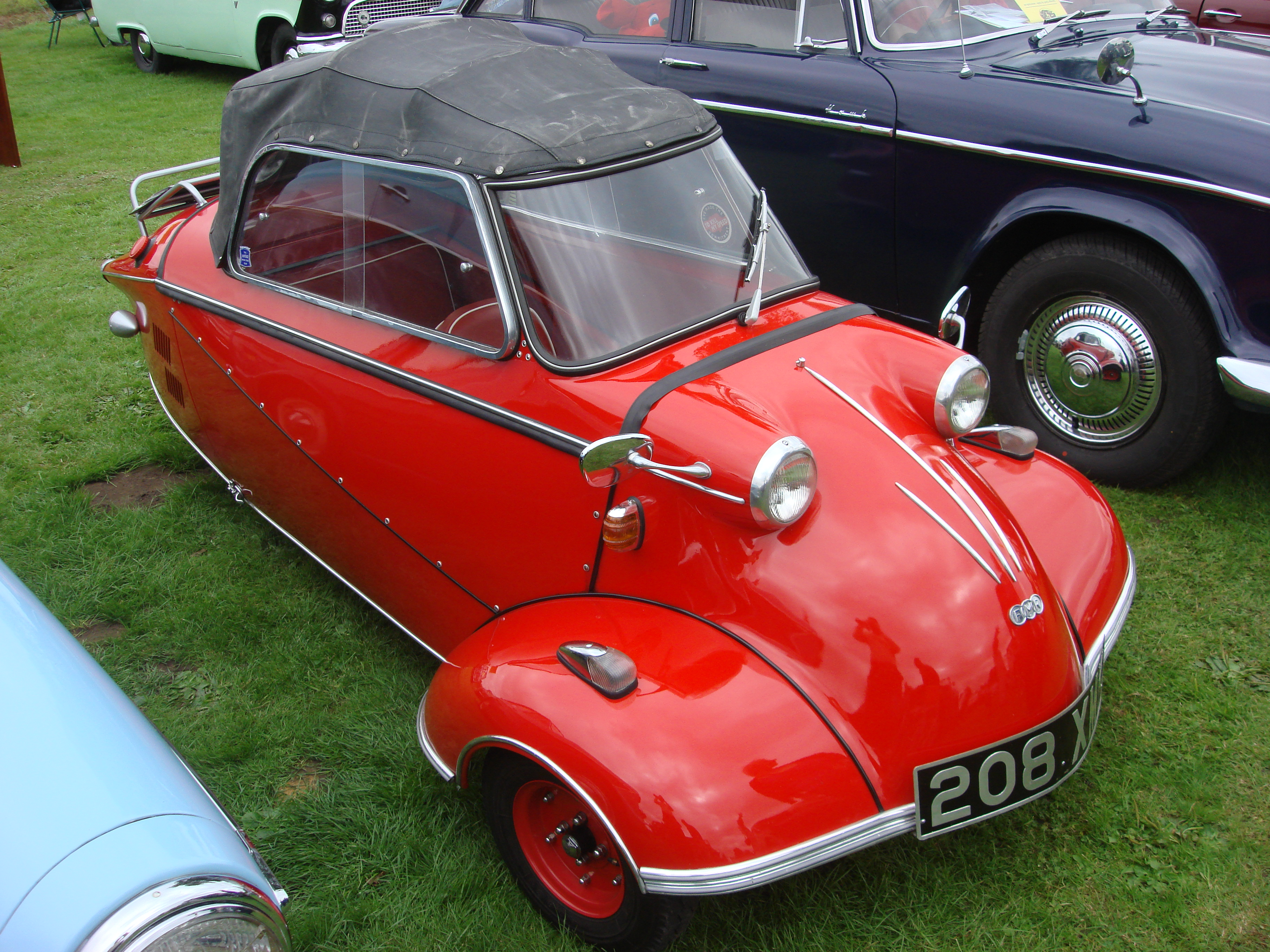
Messerschmitt KR200 Kabrio

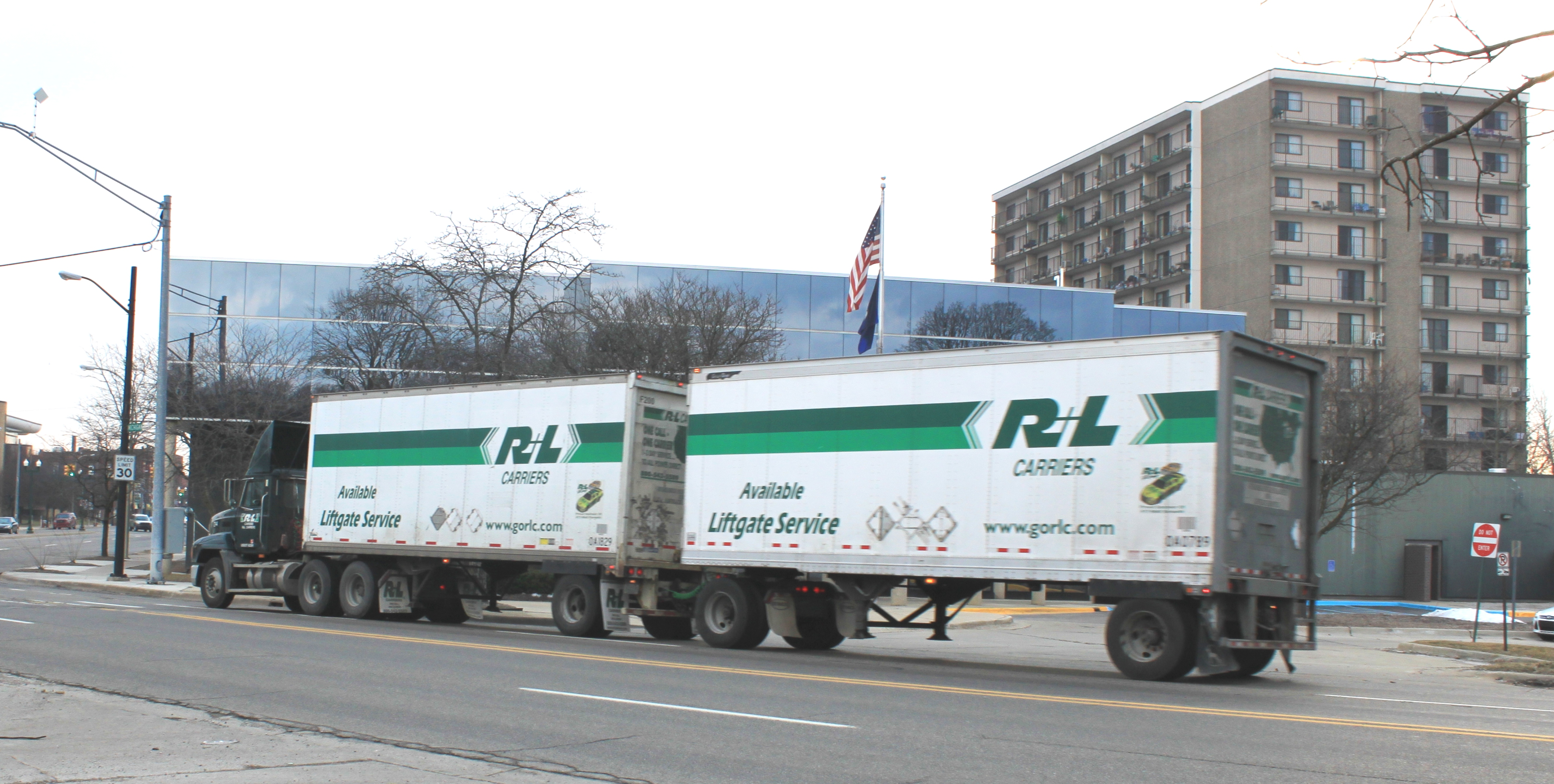
Tandem trailer configuration, pulled by a single tractor

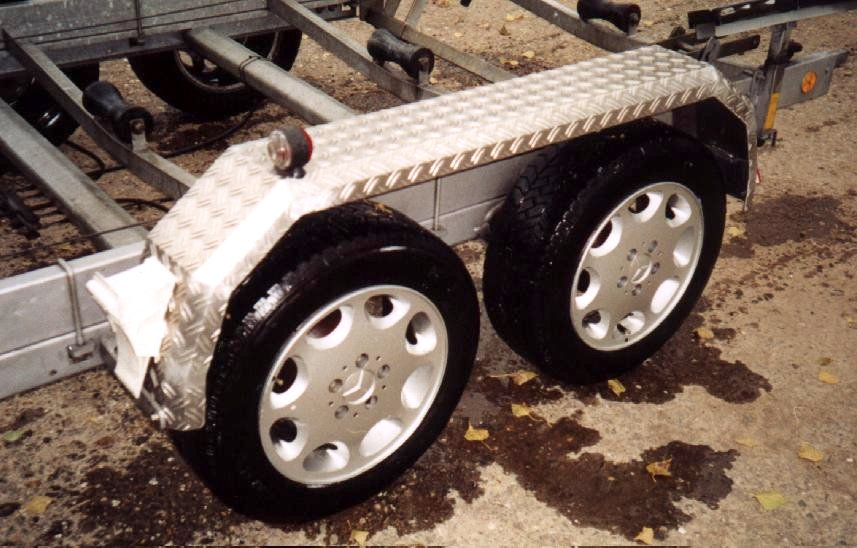
A tandem axle on a small trailer

The front tandem-axles are typically under power by the tractor. The rear tandem-axles, not powered, are supporting the rear of the trailer.

== Aviation ==
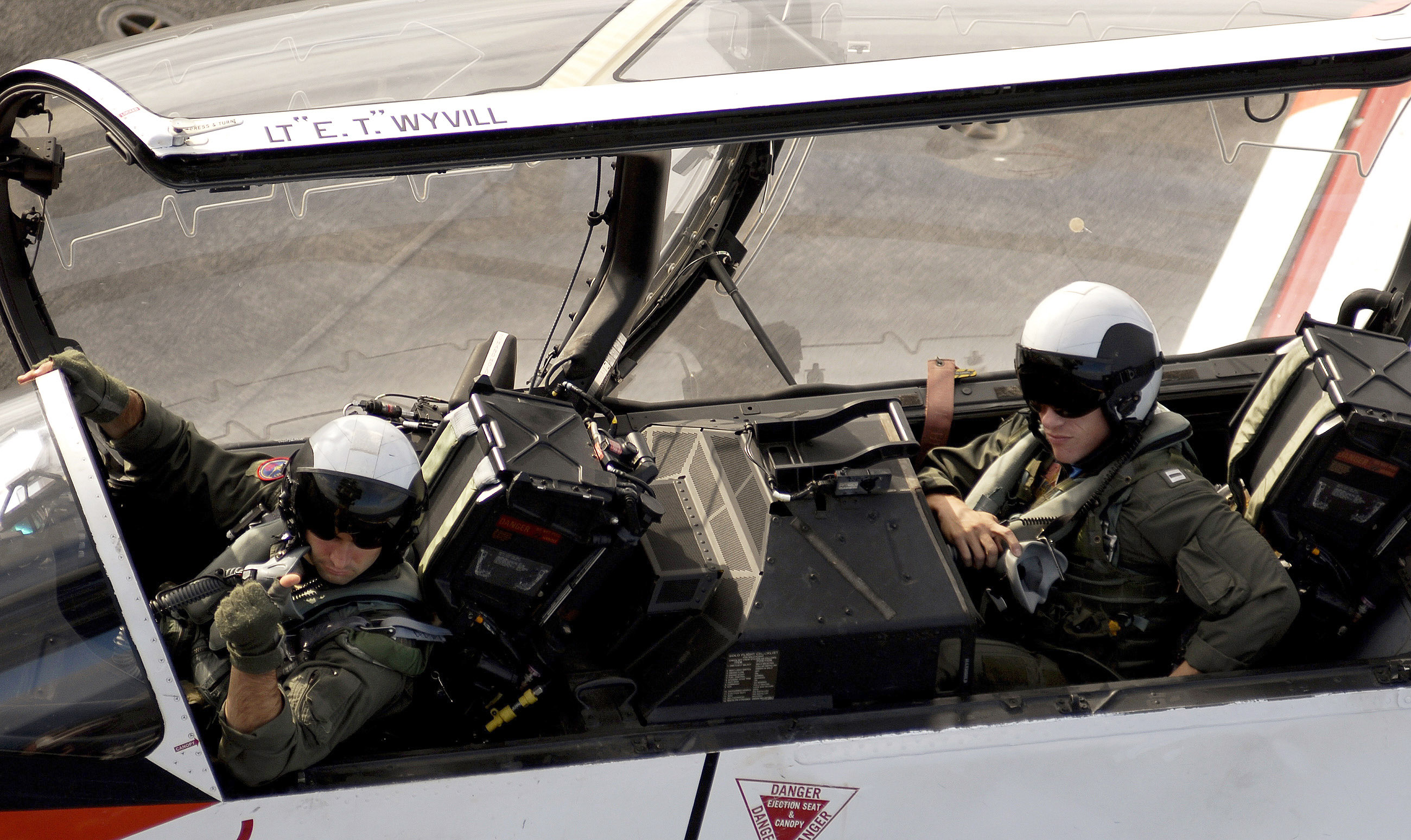
Instructor and student pilots in a McDonnell Douglas T-45 Goshawk aircraft

The two seating configurations for trainer, night and all-weather interceptor or attack aircraft are pilot and instructor side by side or in tandem. Usually, the pilot is in front and the instructor behind. In attack helicopters, sometimes the pilot sits in back with the weapons operator in front for better view to aim weapons, as the Bell AH-1 Cobra was a tandem cockpit redesign which produced a much slimmer profile than the Bell UH-1 Iroquois on which it was based. Attack aircraft and all-weather interceptors often use a second crew member to operate avionics such as radar, or as a second pilot. Bombers such as the Convair B-58 Hustler seated three crew members in tandem. A common engineering adaptation is to lengthen the cockpit or fuselage to create a trainer with tandem seating from a single-seater aircraft.

=== Side-by-side seating ===
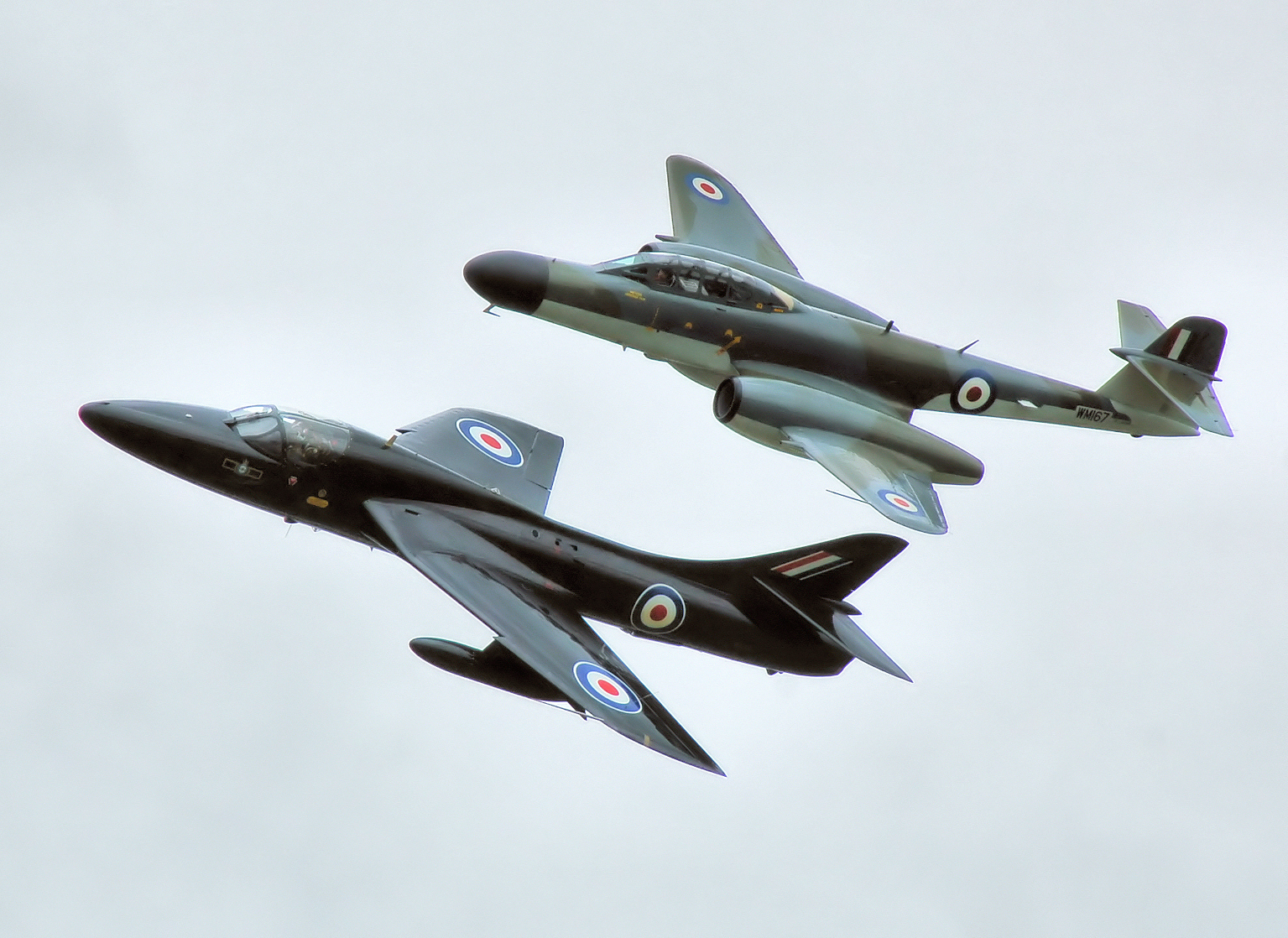
Tandem seat Gloster Meteor (top right) and side-by-side seat Hawker Hunter (trainer)

An alternative configuration is side-by-side seating, which is common in civil aircraft of all sizes, trainers and large military aircraft, but less so in high performance jets and gliders where drag reduction is paramount. The Boeing B-47 Stratojet and Boeing XB-52 bombers used fighter-style tandem seating, but the final B-52 bomber series used a conventional side-by-side cockpit. The Grumman A-6 Intruder, General Dynamics F-111 Aardvark, Saab 105, Sukhoi Su-24 and the Sukhoi Su-34 are examples of combat aircraft that use this configuration. For training aircraft, it has the advantage that pilot and instructor can see each other's actions, allowing the pilot to learn from the instructor and the instructor to correct the student pilot. The tandem configuration has the advantage of being closer to the normal working environment that a fast jet pilot is likely to encounter.

In some cases, such as the Northrop Grumman EA-6B Prowler, a two-place aircraft can be lengthened into a four-place aircraft. Also, a single seat cockpit can be redesigned into a side-by-side arrangement in the case of the Douglas A-1 Skyraider, TF-102 trainer or the Hawker Hunter training versions.

== Insects ==
During mating among odonata (dragonflies and damselflies), a male uses claspers at the end of his abdomen to grab a female between the head and thorax, forming a tandem. The pair may take flight while in tandem.

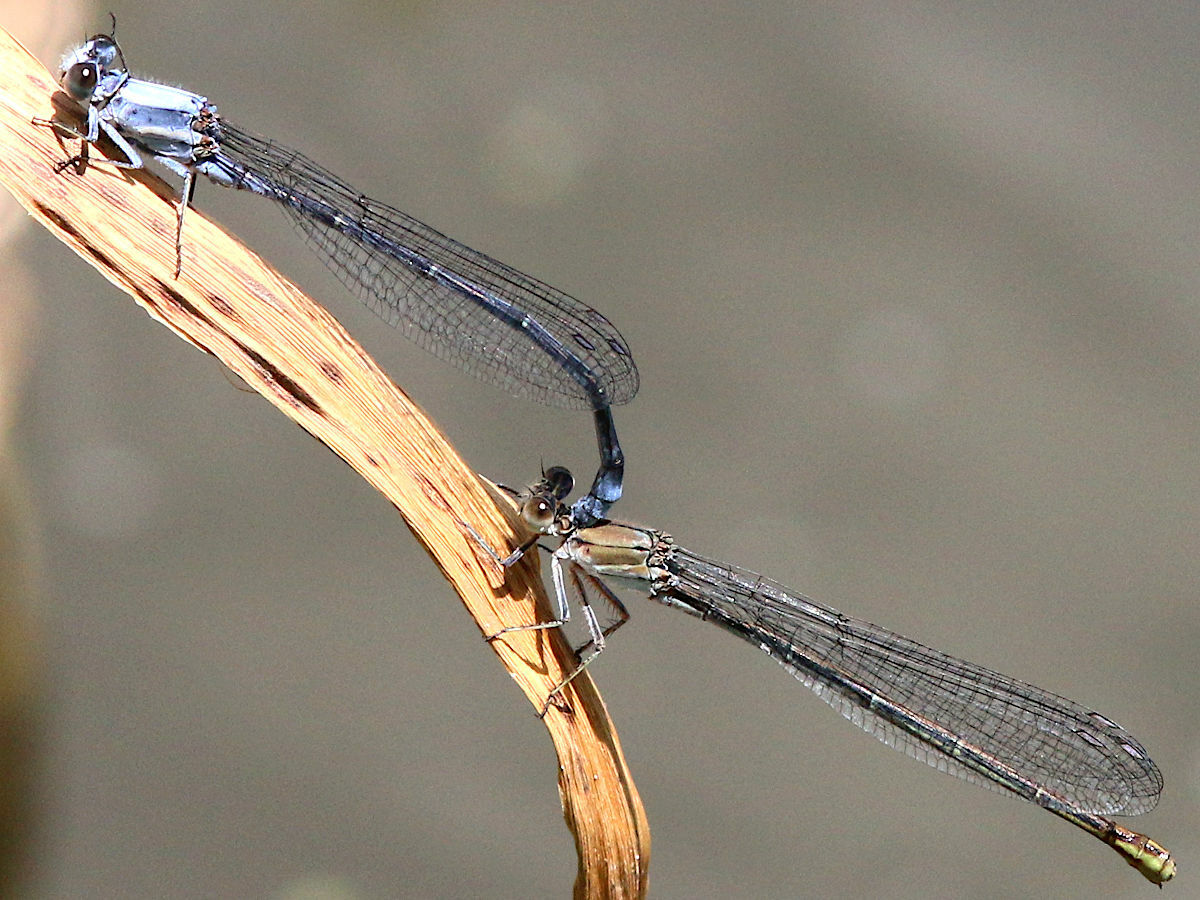
Powdered Dancers in tandem

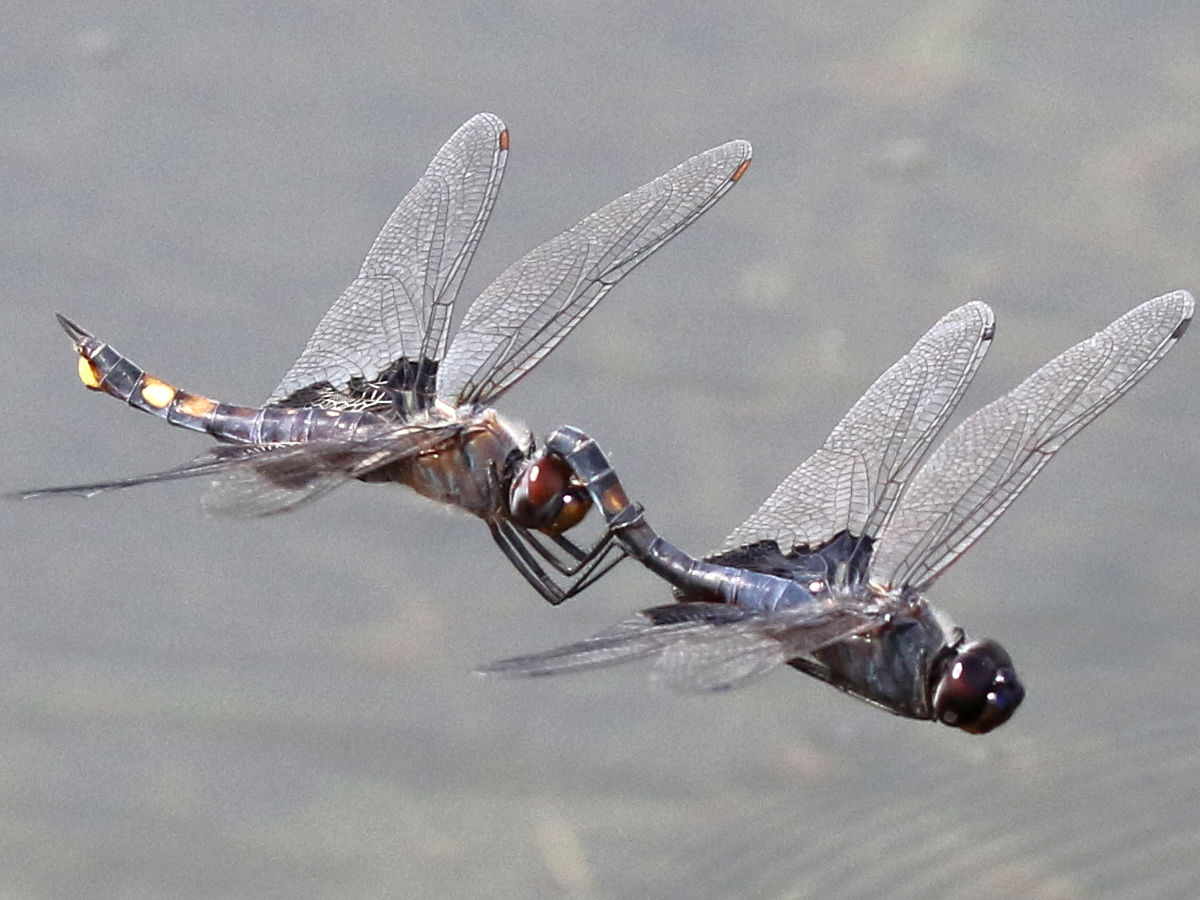
Black saddlebags tandem flight
