= Swedish Air Force Historic Flight =

Association

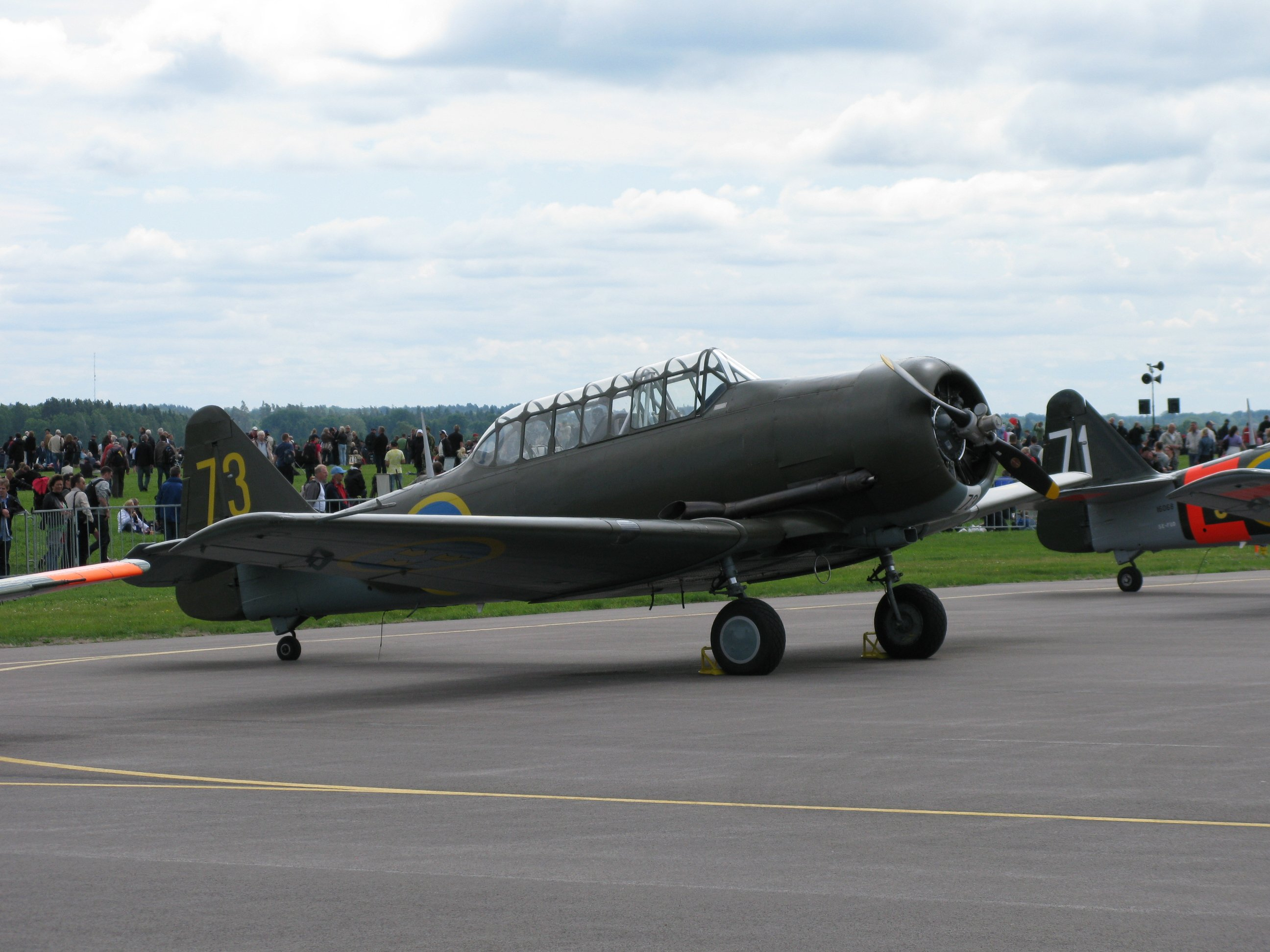
Sk 16 Noorduyn Harvard, civ reg SE-FVU

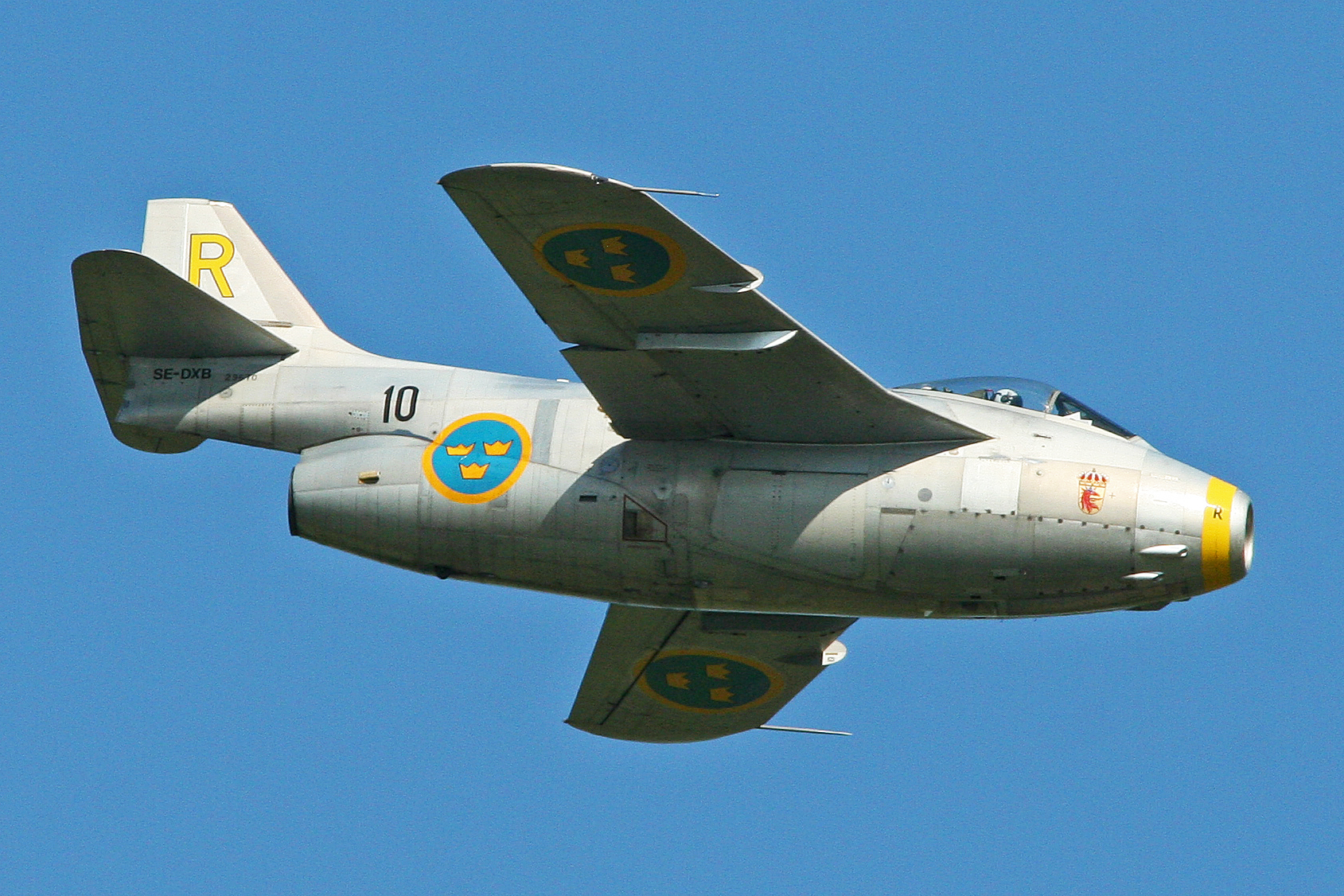
Saab J29F Tunnan, civ reg SE-DXB

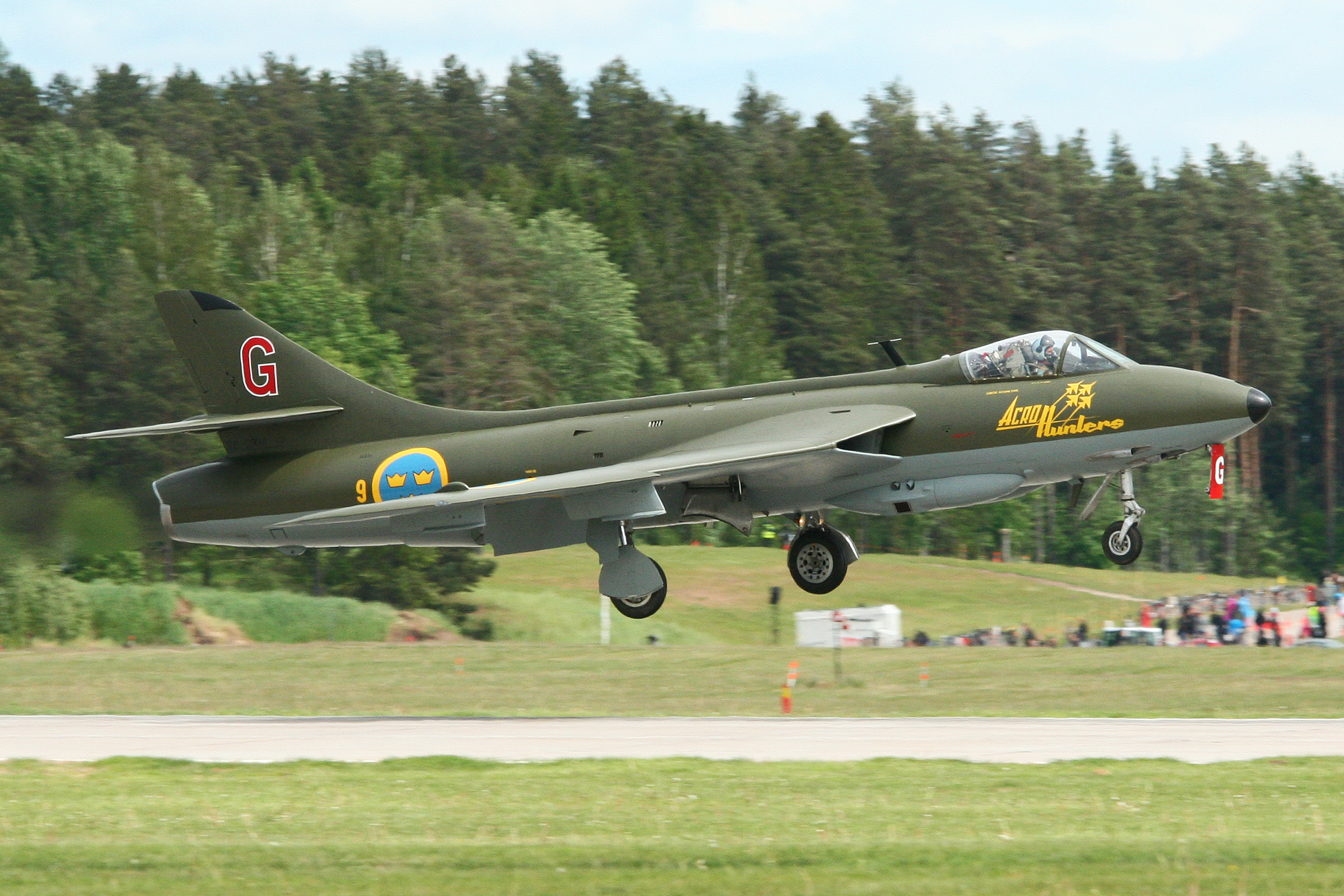
J34 Hawker Hunter, civ reg SE-DXM (former Swiss Air Force J-4082)

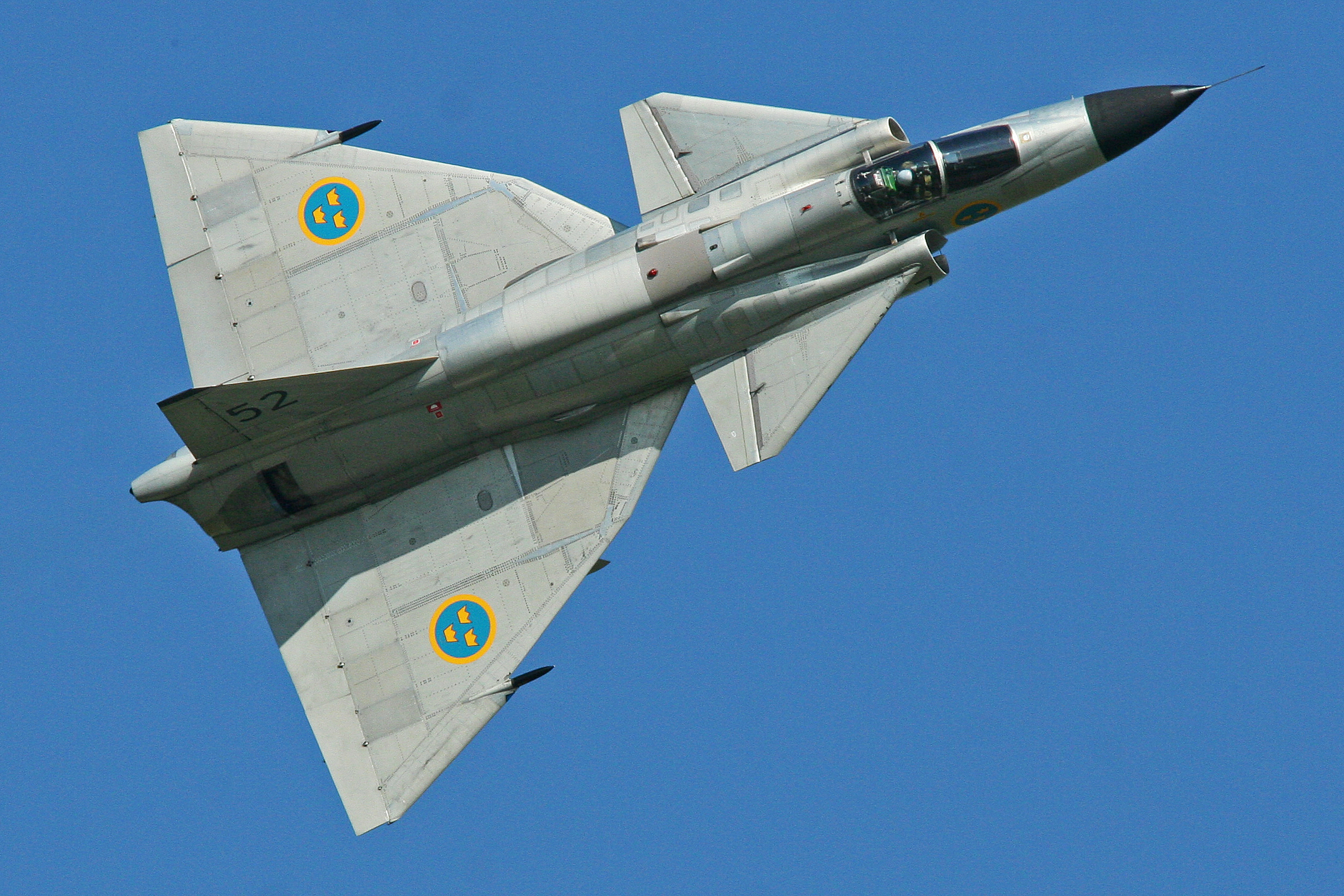
Saab AJS37 Viggen, civ reg SE-DXN

Swedish Air Force Historic Flight (abbreviated in Swedish as SwAFHF ) is an association that flies former Swedish Air Force aircraft and maintains them in an airworthy condition. SwAFHF has been active since 1998 and is housed in premises of the Skaraborg Wing (F 7). SwAFHF is authorized by the Swedish Civil Aviation Administration and the aircraft have civilian Swedish aircraft registration.

== Aircraft operated by SwAFHF ==
- Sk 16 Noorduyn Harvard - SE-FUB, SE-FVU
- B 17A Saab 17 - SE-BYH
- J 29 Saab 29 Tunnan - SE-DXB
- J 34 Hawker Hunter - SE-DXM (former Swiss Air Force J-4082)
- J 32 Saab 32 Lansen - SE-RMD, SE-RME, SE-RMF
- Sk 35C Saab 35 Draken - SE-DXP
- J 35J Saab 35 Draken - SE-DXR
- AJS 37 Saab 37 Viggen - SE-DXN
- Sk 37 Saab 37 Viggen - SE-DXO
- Sk 50 Saab 91 Safir - SE-FVV, SE-EDD
- Sk 60 Saab 105 - SE-DXG
- Sk 60 Saab 105 - SE-RPV
- Sk 60 Saab 105 - SE-RPX
- Sk 60 Saab 105 - SE-RPY
- Sk 60 Saab 105 - SE-RPZ
- Sk 61 Scottish Aviation Bulldog. - SE-FVX
- Cessna 550 - SE-RMI

Other aircraft, not airworthy or on the CAA register, include a Saab 32 Lansen.
