= High Pressure Pure Air Generator =

High Pressure Pure Air Generator (HiPPAG®)
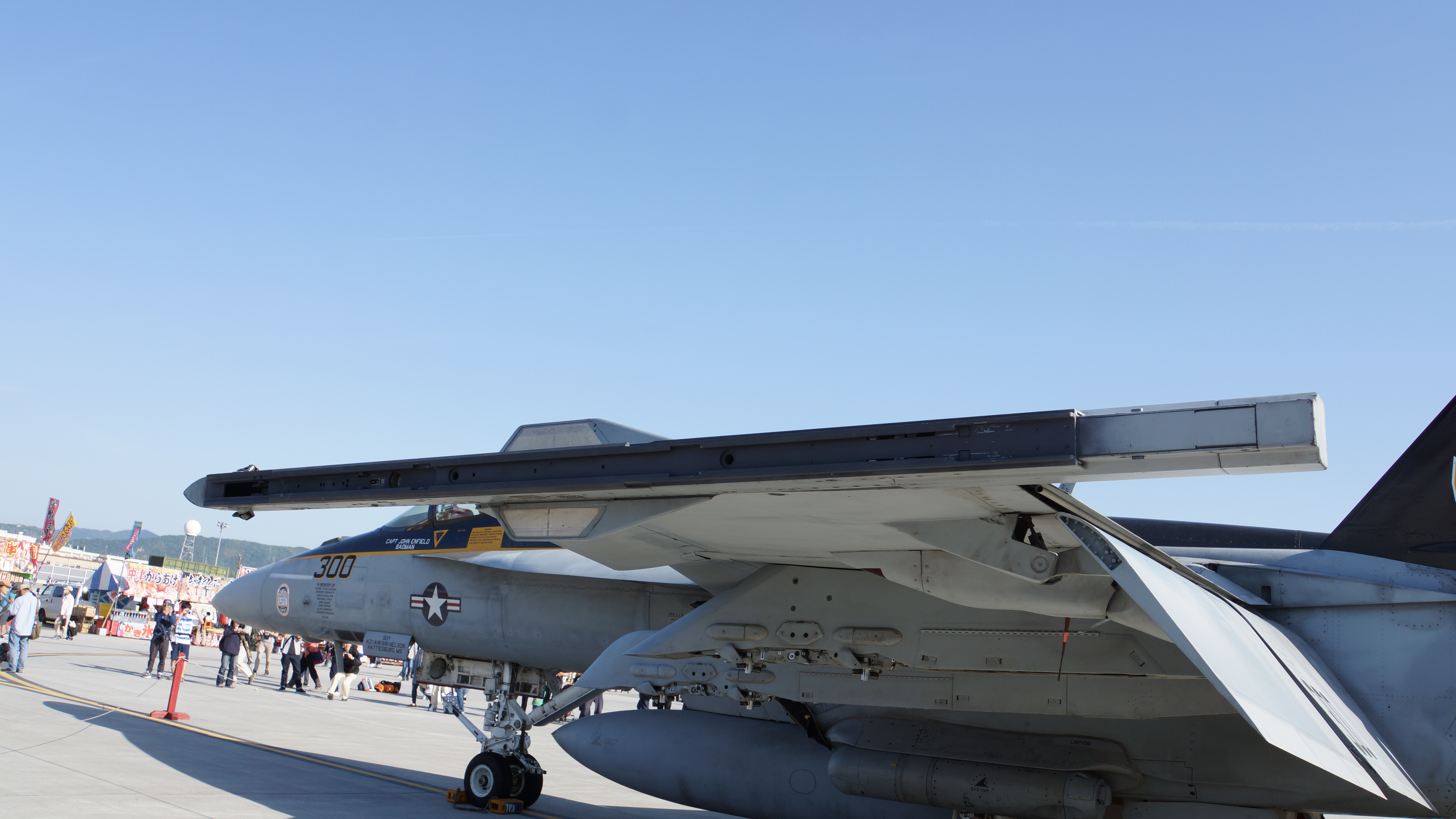
- LAU-127 missile launcher with integrated HiPPAG®
- Type: Pure Air Generating System (PAGS)

Production history
- Manufacturer: Ultra Electronics Precision Air & Land Systems
- Variants: HiPPAG® 320; MPACT

Specifications
- Mass: 8.6 kg (19 lb)

High Pressure Pure Air Generator (HiPPAG®) is a registered trade mark belonging to Ultra Electronics for a type of Pure Air Generating System (PAGS). HiPPAG® is an integrated pure air compressor and filtration system, which continuously consumes atmospheric air during flight or on the ground, and then provides high pressure pure air to cryogenically cool the infrared detector in missile systems. This results in unlimited mission duration by eliminating the need to refill or recharge gas bottles after each flight, a dangerous operation especially on an aircraft carrier flight deck. It was first tested by the United States Navy in 1999.

For United States Navy and United States Marine Corps aviation, the Naval Air Systems Command is responsible for Research, Development, and Acquisition (RDA) activities. Specifically, the Program Executive Office, Unmanned Aviation and Strike Weapons (PEO(U&W)), which reports to the Assistant Secretary of the Navy (Research, Development and Acquisition), oversees Program PMA-201 for Precision Strike Weapons, which includes RDA activities for aircraft armament equipment, including missile launchers.
