= LAU-127 =

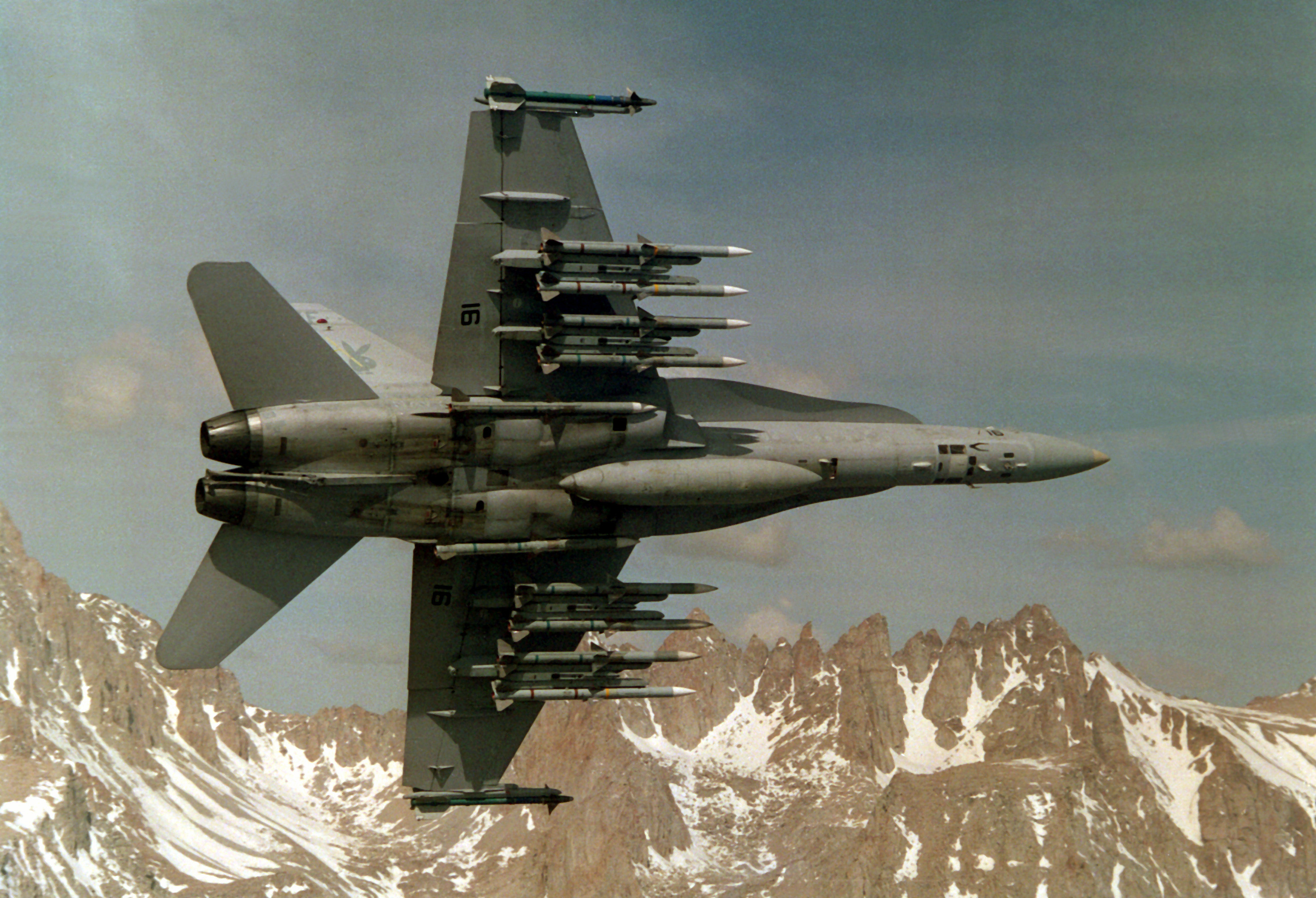
- LAU-127 missile launchers mounted on a US Navy F/A-18C Hornet
- Type: Missile Rail Launcher
- Place of origin: United States

Service history
- Used by: United States Navy; Kuwait Air Force; Swiss Air Force

Production history
- Manufacturer: Hughes Aircraft Company
- Unit cost: $65,000 for LAU-127E/A variant
- Variants: LAU-127A/A, LAU-127B/A, LAU-127C/A, LAU-127D/A, LAU-127E/A, and LAU-127F/A; LAU-139

Specifications
- Mass: 87 lb (39 kg) to 95 lb (43 kg)
- Length: 106 in (2.7 m)
- Width: 3.62 in (9.2 cm)
- Height: 6.06 in (15.4 cm)

The LAU-127, LAU-128, LAU-129 and LAU-139 are a part of Missile Rail launcher (MRL) family of aircraft missile launchers manufactured by Marvin Engineering Co., Inc., based in Inglewood, California.

The Marvin LAU-127 enables the McDonnell Douglas F/A-18 Hornet multirole combat aircraft to carry and launch the AIM-120 Advanced Medium-Range Air-to-Air Missile, or AMRAAM, as well as the AIM-9L, M, and X variants of the AIM-9 Sidewinder missile. The launcher also provides the mechanical and electrical interface between the missile systems and the F/A-18 aircraft, as well as enabling the two-way data communications between the weapon and the aircraft's cockpit controls and displays.

The LAU-127 fires a missile from weapon stations under the wing of the aircraft, mounted to pylons, or on wingtip hard points. When configured on the wing tips, LAU-127 attaches directly to the aircraft wing, as seen on the empty leftmost wingtip station in the picture of the F/A-18E, to launch a variant of the AIM-9 missile. When configured under the wings to fire the AIM-120, LAU-127 attaches to a Raytheon LAU-115C/A guided missile rail launcher, which in turn is suspended from a Marvin BRU-32 bomb ejection rack that is attached to one of two SUU-79/SUU-80 pylon stations underneath each aircraft wings.

The LAU-127 can be integrated with McDonnell Douglas F/A-18A/B/C/D variants of the Hornet, the Boeing F/A-18E/F Super Hornet, and the Boeing EA-18G Growler. The launcher features a power supply and bottled nitrogen or a self-contained compressor, such as a HiPPAG, for missile seeker cooling. The weights vary slightly among the different variants (LAU-127A/A to LAU-127F/A), and the LAU-127C/A HiPPAG units equipped with Pure Air Generating System (PAGS) are also slightly longer than the versions equipped with nitrogen bottles (LAU-127A/A, B/A, and E/A). The units with nitrogen bottles contain a ADU-729/E Nitrogen Receiver Adapter to hold the bottles.

The LAU-128 is a version that is integrated for all models of McDonnell Douglas F-15 Eagle. It requires an ADU-552 (Missile Launcher Adapter) to provide sufficient wing clearance. Variants include the LAU-128A/A, LAU-128B/A, and LAU-128D/A. It is capable of firing similarly-sized non U.S. munitions like Python/Derby and IRIS-T.

The LAU-129 is integrated with General Dynamics F-16 Fighting Falcon. The U.S. variant is the LAU-129A/A; foreign military sales variants include LAU-129B/A, LAU-129C/A, LAU-129D/A, LAU-129E/A and LAU-129F/A. It is also capable of firing similarly-sized non U.S. munitions.

The LAU-139 for the Saab JAS 39 Gripen is also a variation of the LAU-127 Launcher.

MRL is also used surface-based launchers such as NASAMS-3 common rail for canister launcher and open launcher variants, and the AMRDEC Multi-Mission Launcher.

== See also ==
- High Pressure Pure Air Generator
