= Swedish Air Force Museum =

Military museum in Sweden

Coordinates: 58°24′36″N 15°31′25″E

- Flygvapenmuseum
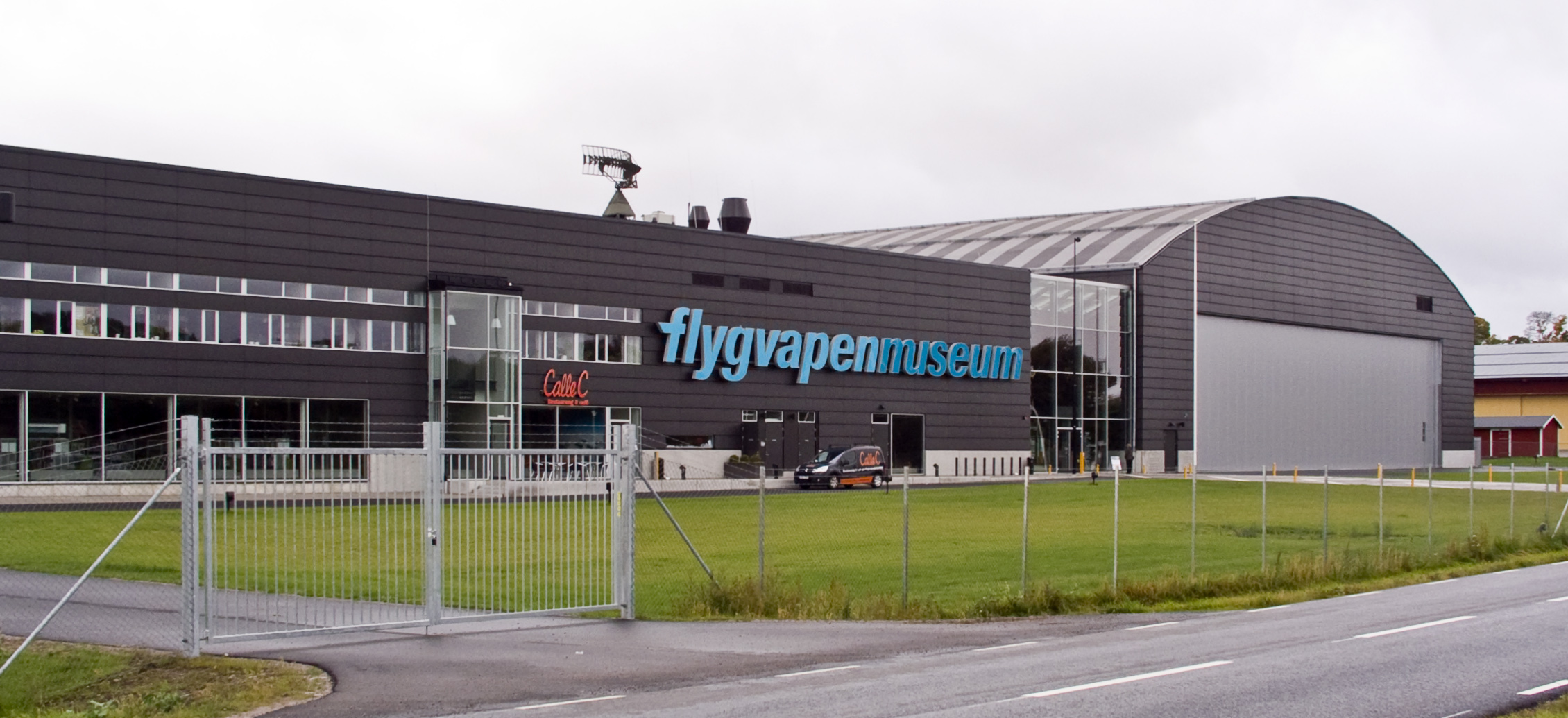
- Established: 1984
- Location: Malmen Airbase, Linköping
- Website: http://www.flygvapenmuseum.se

The Swedish Air Force Museum (Swedish: Flygvapenmuseum) is located at Malmen Airbase in Malmslätt, just outside Linköping, Sweden. Malmen is where Baron Carl Cederström, nicknamed the "Flyer Baron" founded his flying school in 1912. Malmen Airbase is home to the Royal Swedish Airschool operating SAAB 105 (SK60) jet trainers. Along with the Swedish Army Museum (Armémuseum) in Stockholm, Flygvapenmusem constitutes the government agency the National Swedish Museums of Military History (Statens försvarshistoriska museer).

The museum’s collection of artifacts includes aircraft, engines, instruments and uniforms. The museum has a knowledge centre (faktarum), with library and archives, containing literature, periodicals, plans, photographs and personal files relating to aviation.

== History ==
The museum has been in existence since 1984, and served both as the Östgöta Wing squadron museum and a storage building in Ryd. The inauguration of the museum in 1984 marked the beginning of a public aviation museum at Malmen – the cradle of Swedish aviation. In 1989, the museum underwent an additional expansion with a second exhibition hall, enabling it to exhibit a large collection of aircraft from the decade following 1910 to today’s JAS 39 Gripen. The establishment of the Swedish Air Force Museum was also aided by the Östergötland Society for Aviation History (ÖFS). Today, ÖFS acts as a support organisation for the museum, and actively works at tasks such as the restoration of aircraft.

== Design and facilities ==
In 2010 the museum had a major expansion and rebuild. The exhibitions are now divided in themes, for example: 1. Pioneers in aviation, describing the early developments in Swedish aviation history in the period 1910–1926. 2. Between the wars, describing the establishment of the Swedish Airforce and the early developments of the Swedish aviation industry in the period 1926–1939. 3. The Second World War, when the Swedish Airforce increased in size and the first SAAB planes joined in the period 1939–1945. 4. Aviation technology 5. Sweden during the Cold War, showing preparations made in case of war in the period of the 1950s–1980s.

The various exhibitions including the displayed aircraft are shown on three levels in the museum. There are two large hangar sized exhibition halls with a large number of aircraft and a third downstairs showing the DC-3 that was shot down in 1952 and eventually found in 2003. After interim storage, the plane was placed in its final location at the Swedish Air Force Museum on 13 May 2009.

== Awards ==
The Air Force Museum won the award for the 2011 Swedish Museum of the year. The Air Force Museum also won the prize for the 2010 Exhibition of the Year. The 2011 Swedish Museum of the Year award is sponsored by the Swedish chapter of the International Council of Museums (ICOM) and the Association of Swedish Museums. The award for the 2010 Exhibition of the Year is sponsored by FORUM for exhibitors.

== Collection ==
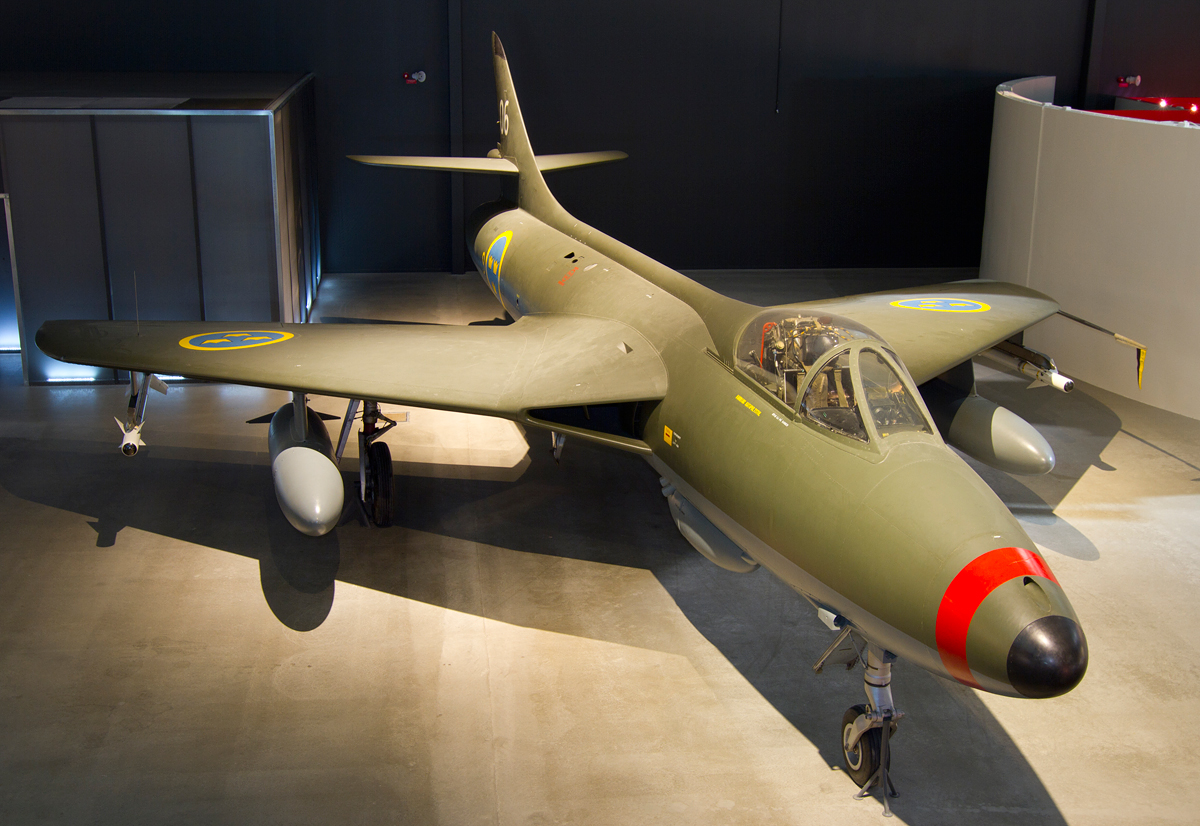
J34 Hawker Hunter on display at the museum

A German built Junkers Ju 86 twin-engined bomber (the only one left in the world), and a wide range of British, American, Italian and Swedish-made aircraft (among others) reveal the diversity of types flown by the Swedish Air Force including aircraft from every stage of Swedish military aviation. Noteworthy exhibition objects from the pioneering days of World War I include an Albatros B.IIa (Sk 1 or Ö2) trainer, as well as Nieuport and Bréguet combat aircraft. All service aircraft of significance from the post-war years are exhibited, from the Saab J 29 "Flying Barrel", a sturdy fighter of the 1950s, to the contemporary 4th generation multirole fighter JAS 39 Gripen. Recently, new exhibitions have been added, based around the salvaged Tp 79 (Swedish Air Force designation for C-47) ELINT aircraft, shot down by a Soviet MiG-15 in 1952. There is also a Saab 39 Gripen simulator in the museum. Just outside the museum an English Electric Canberra (Tp 52), Vickers Varsity (Tp 82) and Douglas C-47A Skytrain (Tp79) are on display but not yet fully restored. Recently, there was also a Hunting-Percival Pembroke (Tp83) outside the museum. However, this has been moved for restoration.

== Displayed in the main exhibition halls ==
- Sk 1 Albatros (Albatros B.II)
- HKP 3C (Agusta Bell 204)
- Breguet Type IV U.1
- Bristol Bloodhound II (Rb 68)
- Sk 25 (Bücker Bü 181 Bestmann)
- B 16 (Caproni Ca.313)
- Tp 47 (Canadian Vickers PBV Canso)
- J 28A (de Havilland Vampire)
- J 33 (De Havilland Venom NF.51)
- Sk 9 (De Havilland DH. 60T Moth Trainer)
- Donnet-Lévêque L II
- Douglas DC-3 (Tp79) Wreckage
- FFVS J 22-2
- Fiat J11 (CR42)
- S 14 (Fiesler Fi 156 Storch)
- Sk 12 (Focke Wulf Fw 44J Stieglitz)
- S 6A (Fokker C.V E)
- FVM Ö1 Tummelisa
- J 8A (Gloster Gladiator Mk.II)
- B 4A (ASJA built Hawker Hart)
- J 34 (Hawker Hunter Mk.50)
- Heinkel HD 35 (Sk 5)
- B 3C-2 (Junkers Ju 86K)
- HKP 4B (Boeing-Vertol KV-107)
- HKP 9A (MBB Bo 105 )
- Mikoyan-Gurevich MiG-15
- M1 (Nieuport IV)
- North American NA-16 (Sk 14)
- J 26 (North American P-51D Mustang)
- J 1 (Phönix 122/Phönix C.I)
- Sk 10 (Raab RK-26 Tigerschwalbe)
- J 20 (Reggiane Re.2000 Falco)
- Saab S 17BL
- Saab B 18B
- Saab J 21A-3
- Saab A 21R
- Saab S 29C
- Saab A 32A Lansen
- Saab J 35D Draken
- Saab AJS 37 Viggen
- Saab JAS 39 Gripen
- Saab SK 60A
- Saab 210
- J 9 (Seversky EP-106)
- HKP 2 (Aerospatialle Alouette II)
- S 31 (Supermarine Spitfire PR.XIX)
- Thulin G
- Hkp 1 (Vertol 44A)
- AB Flygindustri Se-104 (DFS Weihe)

== External display ==
- TP 79 (Douglas C-47)
- TP 52 (English Electric Canberra T11)
- Tp 82 (Vickers Varsity)

== In storage or under restoration ==
- HKP 3C (Agusta Bell 204)
- HKP 6A x3 (Agusta Bell 206)
- HKP 6B (Agusta Bell 206)
- Tp 45 (Beechcraft C-45)
- Sk 25 (Bücker Bü 181 Bestmann)
- Tp 46 (de Havilland DH.104 Dove)
- Sk 11A (ASJA built de Havilland DH.82 Tiger Moth)
- J 28B (de Havilland Vampire FB.5)
- J 28C (de Havilland Vampire T.55)
- Fpl 53 (Dornier Do 27)
- Douglas Skyraider AEW1
- Gloster Meteor T Mk.7
- HKP 5B (Schweizer 296C)
- HKP 4A (Boeing-Vertol KV-107)
- Sk 15A (Klemm Kl 35)
- Lim-1
- Macchi M.7
- Fpl 801 (Malmö Flygindustri MFI-9B)
- Fpl 54 (MFI-10C Vipan)
- MFI-15
- Sk 16A (Noorduyn AT-16 Harvard)
- Tp 78 (Noorduyn Norseman)
- Tp 83 (Percival P.66 Pembroke)
- Saab J 29B
- Saab J 29F
- Saab S 32C
- Saab J 32E Lansen x2
- Saab J 32B Lansen x2
- Saab S 35E Draken x2
- Saab J 35F Draken
- Saab J 35J Draken
- Saab SK 35C Draken
- Saab AJ 37 Viggen
- Saab JA 37 Viggen
- Saab SK 37 Viggen
- Saab Sk 50 Safir x2
- Saab Sk 50B Safir
- Saab SK 60B
- SK 61 (Scottish Aviation Bulldog) x3
- SNCAC NC.701 Martinet
- P1 (Sparmann S1A)
- TP 85 (Sud Aviation Caravelle)
- TF-35
- G 101 (Stamer Lippisch Zögling)
- AB Flygplan Se-102 (Grunau Baby)
- AB Flygplan Se-103 (DFS Kranich II)

== See also ==
- List of aerospace museums
- Swedish Air Force Historic Flight

== Bibliography ==
- Berns, Lennart (April–July 1982). "Destination: Disaster". Air Enthusiast. No. 18. pp. 54–60. ISSN 0143-5450.
- "The Malmen Collection...". Air Enthusiast. No. 18. April–July 1982. pp. 58–59. ISSN 0143-5450.
