= SAAB 21 =

Attack aircraft in Sweden

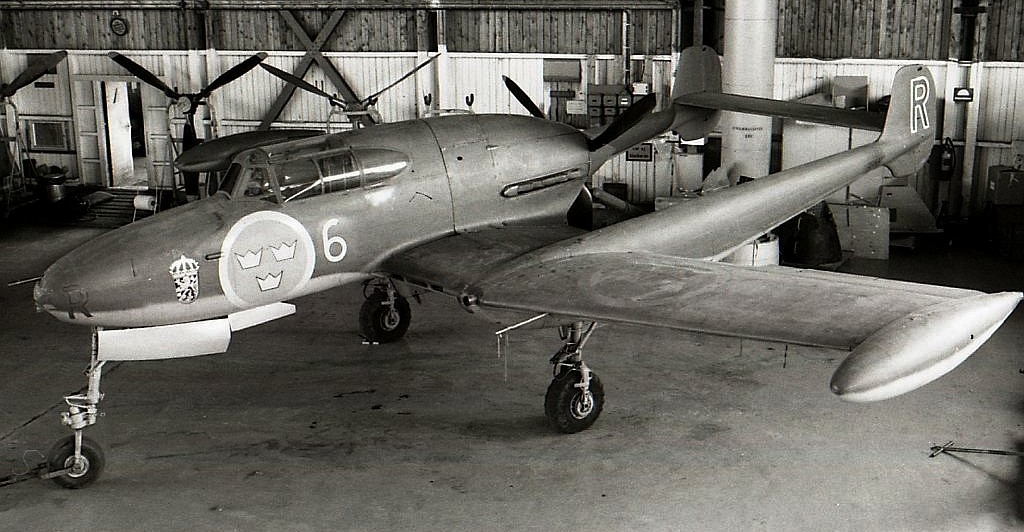

General information
- Type: Fighter and attack aircraft
- National origin: Sweden
- Manufacturer: SAAB
- Status: Retired
- Primary user: Swedish Air Force
- Number built: 298

History
- Manufactured: 1945–1949
- Introduction date: 1 December 1945
- First flight: 30 July 1943
- Retired: 23 July 1954
- Developed into: SAAB 21R

The SAAB 21 is a Swedish single-seat low-wing monoplane fighter and attack aircraft designed and manufactured by SAAB. Its twin boom fuselage with a pusher engine gives the aircraft an unusual appearance.

Work began at SAAB following a Swedish Air Force decision to embark on a major expansion programme in preparation for the possibility of being drawn into the Second World War. The company designed a monoplane twin-boom aircraft, powered by a single Daimler-Benz DB 605B engine that was positioned at the rear of the fuselage nacelle, driving a pusher propeller. This arrangement allowed guns to be carried in the aircraft's nose while providing the pilot with good visibility. An ejection seat was adopted to enable the pilot to bail out without hitting the propeller.

On 30 July 1943, the 21 performed its maiden flight and on 1 December 1945, the first examples of the J 21A-1 were introduced to service. It was quickly followed by the improved J 21A-2, which featured heavier armament, and the J 21A-3 fighter-bomber.

With jet-powered aircraft rapidly overtaking piston-powered aircraft, in 1947 SAAB produced a conversion of the 21 using the British de Havilland Goblin jet engine, the resulting airframe being designated the SAAB 21R. Along with the Soviet Yakovlev Yak-15, the SAAB 21 was one of only two jet fighters to be successfully converted from piston power to jet power.

The 21 was replaced in the mid-1950s after less than 10 years of service by the similarly configured de Havilland Vampire and the Saab 29 Tunnan.

== Design and development ==
=== Background ===
SAAB was carrying out design studies during the late 1930s into possible options for a new fighter aircraft. Many of these had been based around the use of a British Bristol Taurus radial engine and some were unconventional for the time. One of the configurations studied was of a monoplane pusher configuration twin-boom aircraft, with the engine behind the pilot at the rear of a central nacelle. This unorthodox design possessed several advantages, such as the ability to concentrate most of the guns in the aircraft's nose, good pilot visibility, and ease of service. While this promising design study was completed, it remained dormant until 1941, when defence considerations heightened the imminent need for it.

At the start of Second World War, the Swedes became concerned about maintaining their neutrality and independence as they would soon be threatened by one or more European nations. As an emergency measure, the Swedish Air Force embarked upon a major rearmament and expansion of their military during the 1939–1941 period, which included the procurement of foreign-sourced aircraft as well as the local development of new, modern designs. However, as a consequence of the war, few nations at war were willing to supply fighters to a neutral country, while Sweden's own production capability would be insufficient until at least 1943. As a consequence, Sweden was forced to purchase already obsolete Fiat CR.42 biplanes from Italy as an interim measure, and which were of little value against modern monoplane fighters. Accordingly, SAAB began looking at solutions to various anticipated production problems for their proposed fighter.

=== Design ===
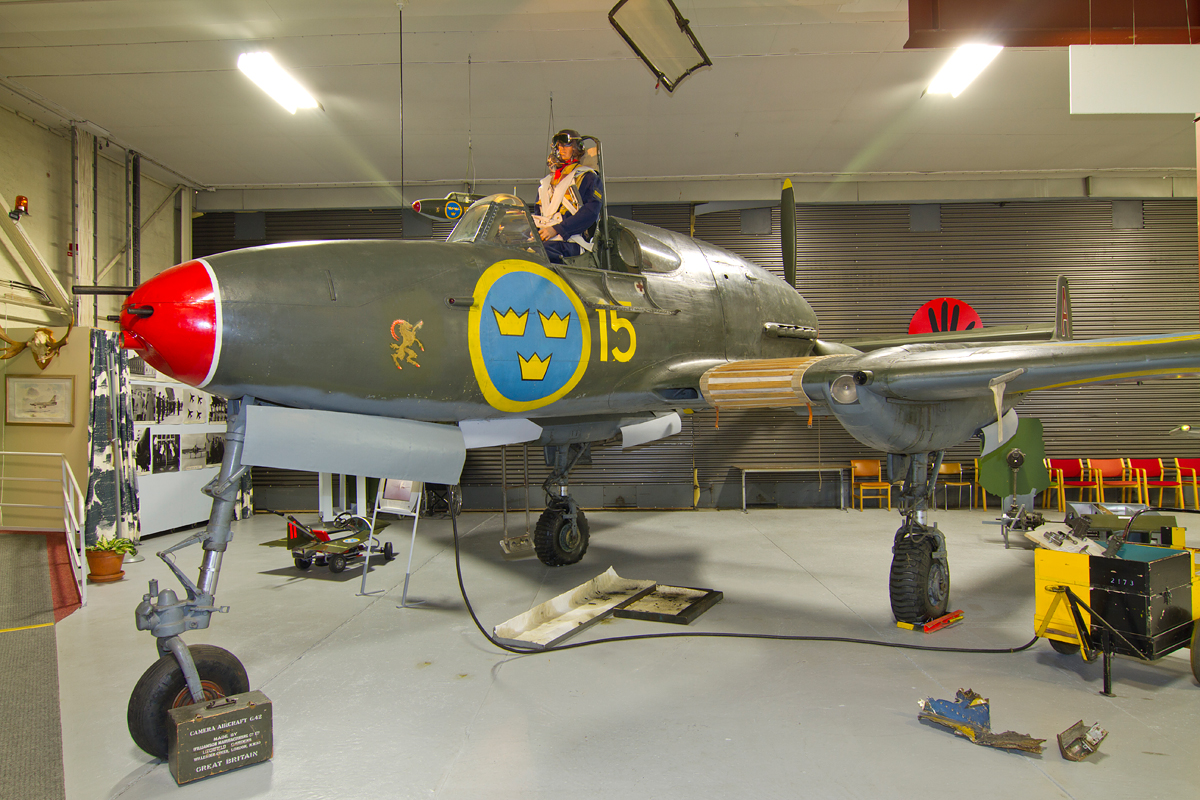
SAAB A21A-3 on display at Söderhamn /F15 Aviation Museum, Söderhamn, Sweden

The SAAB J 21 needed a top speed of at least 480 km/h (300 mph), which required a powerful engine. It was decided to substitute the Taurus engine for the American Pratt & Whitney R-1830 Twin Wasp radial engine. However Svenska Flygmotor was also asked to provide an alternative to the Twin Wasp. Options were limited by the urgency involved, leaving a license-produced engine as the only option. Accordingly, a locally built version of Germany's new 1,100 kW (1,500 hp) Daimler-Benz DB 605B inline engine was selected, however, due to the DB 605B's lack of maturity, a great deal of refinement and modification by Swedish engineers was required to ready it for operational use.

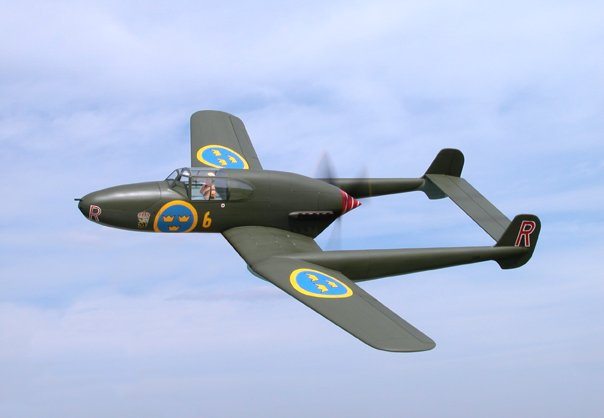
Artist's depiction of a J 21 in flight

The SAAB 21 was an unorthodox twin-boom low wing pusher configuration fighter aircraft with a tricycle landing gear, and a heavy forward-firing armament. Several recent innovations were incorporated into its design, including an ejection seat for the pilot while the pusher layout later allowed the type to be readily re-engined with a turbojet. The advantages of a pusher design include an unobstructed forward view for the pilot, and the armament can be concentrated in the nose, however, a major drawback is difficulty in making an emergency exit as the pilot could get drawn into the propeller blades. Many solutions were examined, such as jettisoning either the propeller or the engine via explosive charges prior to bailing out, before it was decided to adopt an ejection seat developed by Swedish defense firm Bofors, in parallel with the fighter. The J 21 was one of the first operational aircraft in the world with an ejection seat.

The wing of the 21 was built around a SAAB-designed laminar airfoil. As the wings could not readily accommodate the main landing gear when retracted, wells were provided in the tail booms, aft of the rear wing spar. To reduce drag, coolers and ducts for the engine were located in the wing section between the fuselage and tail booms, and integral fuel tanks were fitted.

The armament initially consisted of one nose mounted 20 mm (0.79 in) Hispano-Suiza Akan m/41A and four 13.2 mm (0.52 in) Akan m/39AA autocannons, two in the wings, and two in the nose. On the A-2 the 20 mm (0.79 in) guns were replaced with belt fed 20 mm (0.79 in) Bofors Akan m/45. The J 21A-3 (later designated A 21A) could carry rockets and bombs. Later in the Saab 21's service life the 13.2 mm (0.52 in) autocannons were rebarreled to fire American 12.7 mm (0.50 in) ammunition due to economics. These improved firing performance but the Saab 21 was now only viable as a ground attack aircraft due to the rate of change in fighter design.

Three prototypes were completed of which only two were to be flyable, while the third was a static airframe for stress testing purposes. On 30 July 1943, the first J 21 prototype conducted its maiden flight, flown by SAAB test pilot Claes Smith. During takeoff, he used too much flap, impairing acceleration and climb. This resulted in it hitting a fence and damaging the undercarriage, although he was able to land successfully afterwards.

=== Further development ===
During 1945, several options were explored to improve the 21's performance. During the first half of the year, the company was working on a variant that would be powered by a 1,500 kW (2,000 hp) Rolls-Royce Griffon engine to give the 21 a projected top speed of 669 km/h (416 mph). Other projects, such as the Saab 27 were also designed for the Griffon, however all work on piston-engine upgrades was abandoned by the end of the year. In parallel with these studies, SAAB and other Swedish companies had been evaluating the adoption of jet propulsion. Two early studies, designated as RX 1 and RX 2, were twin-boom aircraft similar to the 21. Swedish Air Force enthusiasm for a jet fighter in late 1945 pushed SAAB to produce a version of the J 21 using jet propulsion.

At Swedish Air Force request, existing J 21 aircraft were converted to jet propulsion in 1947 and redesignated J 21R. This required modifications to over 50 per cent of the airframe, including the tailplane and wing. The aircraft was to be powered by a single British-sourced de Havilland Goblin turbojet engine, to replace the DB 605B. It entered Swedish Air Force service as their first jet aircraft.

== Operational history ==
The first example from the first batch of 54 of the first production variant, the J 21A-1 was delivered to the Swedish Air Force on 1 December 1945. Construction was at SAAB's main plant in Trollhättan and deliveries of this model ran until 5 December 1946, when deliveries of two batches totalling 124 of the J 21A-2 began. A third order, in two batches totalling 119 of the A21A-3 fighter-bomber completed production of the piston-engine variants. A total of 298 J 21As were constructed prior to the production line ending in 1948.

During December 1945, the Svea Wing (F 8) became the first fighter unit to receive the J 21. During the following year, other units of the Swedish Air Force, such as Göta Wing (F 9), also began to receive the type. However, within less than four years, some squadrons were already being re-equipped with a new generation of jet fighters capable of far greater speed, such as the de Havilland Vampire. Despite the original intention for the type to be principally used in air defence roles, in service, the J 21 was utilized mainly in the light bomber role. The type was used only by the Swedish Air Force.

Officials doubted its effectiveness due to its unconventional design. In response, the Swedish Air Board requested that SAAB study a development with the engine in the nose as the J 23. This aircraft used the J 21's DB 605B engine and had a more traditional appearance, similar to the North American P-51 Mustang, but its projected performance was reduced, which became a key factor in improving the J 21 instead. The Swedish Air Force became interested in jet propulsion and from 1945, SAAB began studying modifications of the airframe to accommodate a jet engine in place of its piston engine. Production of the piston-engine version continued until 1948 while examples of the new jet engine version began being converted on the line. As a result of the conversions, the piston-engine powered J 21A began being retired in 1954.

== Variants ==
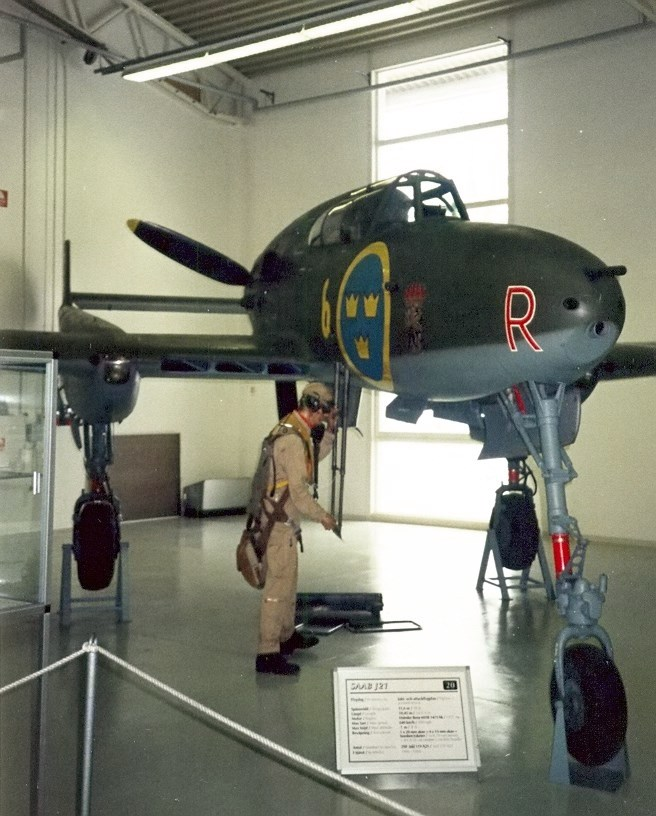
Saab A 21A-3

J 21A-1
First production series of fighter version. 54 built between 1945 and 1946, retired in 1949.
J 21A-2
Second and third production series of fighter version (62 aircraft each built between 1946 and 1947). Aircraft had better avionics and was armed with a Swedish 20 mm (0.79 in) gun. Retired between 1953 and 1954.

J 21A-3 (later designated A 21A)

First and second production series of attack version (66 aircraft each built between 1947 and 1949). Aircraft was a J 21A-2 equipped with a bomb aiming sight and had pylons for bombs and rockets. It was later upgraded to be able to use two RATO rockets.
J 21B
Planned version armed with three 20 mm (0.79 in) nose guns, radar in the starboard boom, improved aerodynamics, P-51 style bubble canopy and a stronger engine. Suggested engines were at first the Daimler-Benz DB 605E or the Rolls-Royce Griffon engine but due to the end of the war Germany could not deliver the DB-605E and the British had not yet finished the development of the Griffon engine. It was then decided to use the Swedish DB-605B engine modified to 1700 hp. A full scale mockup was built but due to the jet age the project was scrapped at the end of 1945 due to the Saab 29 project. None built.

== Surviving aircraft ==
Three aircraft are preserved on permanent static display;

- J 21A-3, serial 21286, but rebuilt as an A 21R, at the Swedish Air Force Museum.
- J 21A-3, serial 21311 at F 15 Söderhamn Flygmuseum.
- J 21A-3, serial 21364 at the Swedish Air Force Museum.

== Specifications (J 21A-2) ==
Saab J 21 3-view drawing

Data from Beskrivning över fpl typ 21A, häfte 1 [description of airplane type 21A, booklet 1], Beskrivning över fpl typ 21A, häfte 6 kap L. Beväpning [description of airplane type 21A, booklet 6, chapter L. armament], SAAB J21/J21R

General characteristics

- Crew: 1
- Length: 10.45 m (34 ft 3 in)
- Wingspan: 11.6 m (38 ft 1 in)
- Height: 3.97 m (13 ft 0 in)
- Wing area: 22.2 m^{2} (239 sq ft)
- Airfoil: Saab laminar airfoil
- Empty weight: 3,250 kg (7,165 lb)
- Gross weight: 4,150 kg (9,149 lb)
- Max takeoff weight: 5,200 kg (11,464 lb)
- Fuel capacity: 510 L (130 US gal; 110 imp gal) internal and 2 × 160 L (42 US gal; 35 imp gal) drop tanks (Note: 2 × 400 L (110 US gal; 88 imp gal) drop tanks for A-3)
- Powerplant: 1 × Daimler-Benz DB 605B V-12 inverted liquid-cooled piston engine, 1,085 kW (1,455 hp) built by SFA
- Propellers: 3-bladed constant-speed pusher propeller

Performance

- Maximum speed: 650 km/h (400 mph, 350 kn) (Note: 560 km/h (350 mph; 300 kn) for A-3)
- Cruise speed: 495 km/h (308 mph, 267 kn) (Note: 425 km/h (264 mph; 229 kn) for A-3)
- Range: 750 km (470 mi, 400 nmi)
- Ferry range: 1,190 km (740 mi, 640 nmi) (Note: 1,650 km (1,030 mi; 890 nmi) for A-3)
- Service ceiling: 10,200 m (33,500 ft) (Note: 7,500 m (24,606 ft) for A-3)
- Rate of climb: 15 m/s (3,000 ft/min)
- Landing speed: 145 km/h (90 mph; 78 kn)

Armament

- Guns:
  - 1× 20 mm (0.79 in) akan m/45 with 140 rounds in the nose (Note: akan m/41A with 60 rounds in A-1)
  - 2 × 13.2 mm (0.52 in) Automatkanon m/39A with 350 rpg in the nose
  - 2 × 13.2 mm (0.52 in) akan m/39A with 325 rpg in the wings

=== J(A) 21A-3 ===
The J(A) 21A-3 could carry a maximum of 700 kg (1,543 lb) of stores from a combination of:

Inner wing mount (only used for rockets until the outer racks were developed)

- 4 × 50 kg (110 lb) minbomb m/37 general-purpose bombs, or sprängbomb m/42 or m/47 fragmentation bombs or bombkapsel m/43 cluster bombs
- 4 × 8 cm (3.1 in) pansarraket m/46 Armour-piercing RP-3 rocket
- 4 × 15 cm (5.9 in) sprängraket m/46 High-explosive semi-armour-piercing (SAP) RP-3 rocket

'Outer wing mount

- 8 × 8 cm (3.1 in) Armour-piercing RP-3 rockets (pansarraket m/46)
- 8 × 14.5 cm (5.7 in) Bofors pansarsprängraket m/49A & B HEAT warhead rocket
- 8 × 15 cm (5.9 in) High-explosive semi-armour-piercing RP-3 rocket](sprängraket m/46) or Bofors sprängraket m/51A & B high-explosive rocket
- 2 × 18 cm (7.1 in) Bofors halvpansarraket m/49A & B Armour-piercing high-explosive anti-ship rocket (later used against general targets.)

Belly

- 1 × 250 kg (550 lb) minbomb m/37 or m/40 or m/50 general-purpose bomb
- 1 × 500 kg (1,100 lb) minbomb m/41 general-purpose bomb
- 1 × 600 kg (1,300 lb) minbomb m/50 general-purpose bomb

Wingtips

- 2 × vingspetstank drop tanks which could be armed in flight as incendiary bombs, and were tested with napalm.

== See also ==
Related development

- Saab 21R

Aircraft of comparable role, configuration, and era

- Mansyū Ki-98
- Mitsubishi J4M
- Vultee XP-54 Swoose Goose

Related lists

- List of fighter aircraft
- List of military aircraft of Sweden
