= Saab 21R =

Swedish first-generation jet fighter-bomber

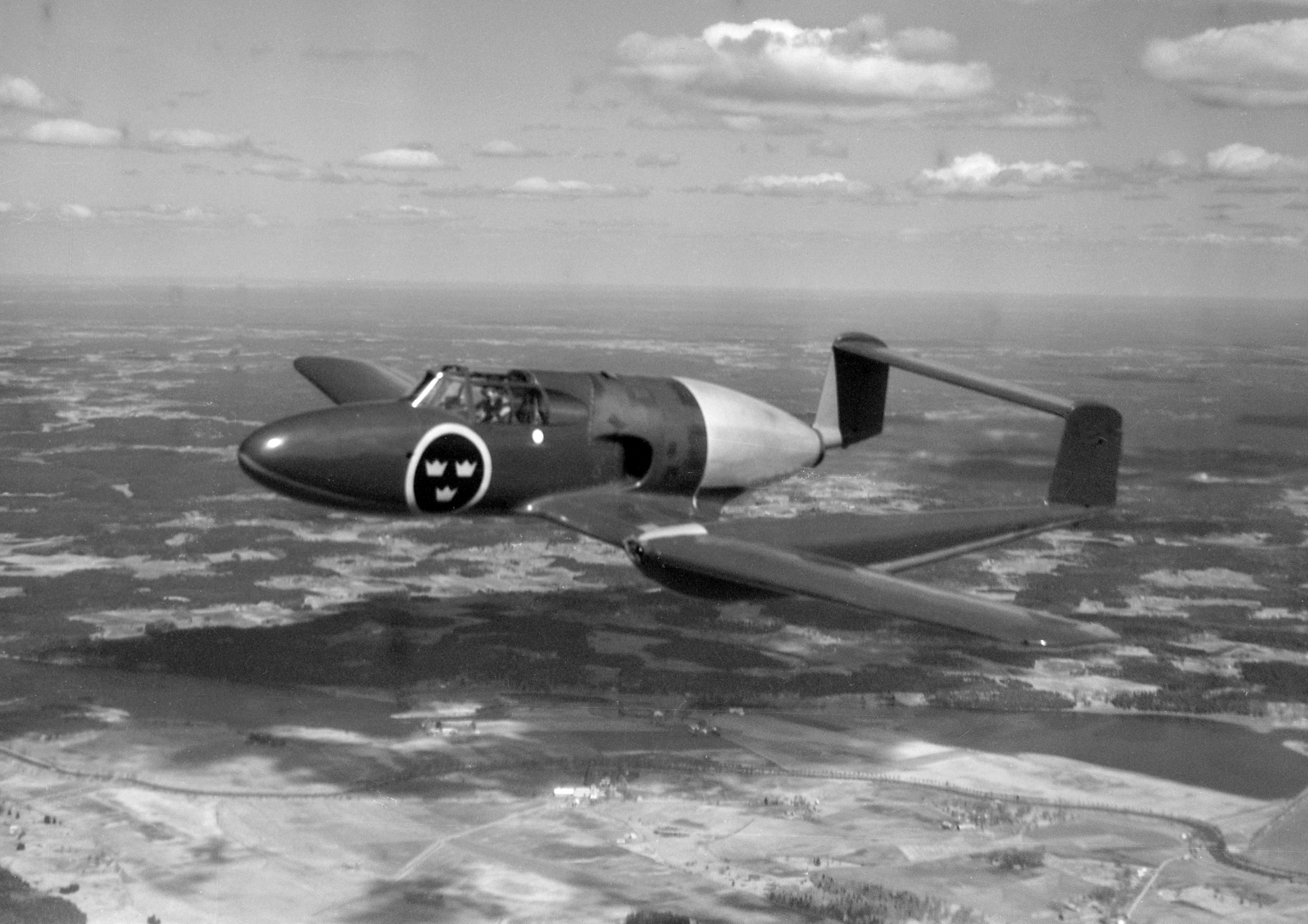

General information
- Type: Fighter and attack aircraft
- National origin: Sweden
- Manufacturer: SAAB
- Status: Retired
- Primary user: Swedish Air Force
- Number built: 64

History
- Manufactured: 1950–1952
- Introduction date: 1950
- First flight: 10 March 1947
- Retired: 1956
- Developed from: SAAB 21

The Saab 21R was a Swedish fighter/attack aircraft developed and produced by Svenska Aeroplan AB (SAAB). It was a jet-powered development of the piston-engined SAAB 21 and was the first jet aircraft to be produced by Saab. The R-suffix stands for reaktion (reaction), referencing reaktionsdrift (jet power) or reaktionsmotor (jet engine). Along with the Soviet Yakovlev Yak-15, the 21R was one of only two jet fighters to have been successfully converted from piston-powered aircraft.

Sweden was under threat during the Second World War, and ordered SAAB to develop an advanced fighter. The result was an unorthodox twin-boom pusher, with a low wing, tricycle landing gear, and a heavy forward-firing armament. Several options were then explored to improve its performance, leading to a jet-powered version.

During 1947, SAAB began converting the piston-engined J 21s to jet propulsion, which required extensive modifications. One hundred twenty-four aircraft were planned, however this number was reduced to 64 and they were instead mainly used as fighter-bombers. It saw service in the late 1940s and early 1950s before it was replaced by a new generation of fighters designed from the onset with jet propulsion, such as the de Havilland Vampire and the Saab 29 Tunnan.

== Design and development ==
=== Background ===
During the early stages of the Second World War, Sweden was concerned that its neutrality and its independence could be threatened by one of the belligerent powers, and so enacted a series of emergency measures to increase its military's preparedness and deterrence value against potential aggressors. Between 1939 and 1941, the Swedish Air Force committed itself to a major expansion programme, which included the procurement of large numbers of foreign and locally developed fighters. As a consequence of the conflict, few nations possessed available production capacity or a willingness to supply modern fighters to Sweden, being a relatively small neutral country. While Sweden's own domestic production capability would be insufficient until at least 1943, Sweden would have to develop its own first-rate designs to meet its needs.

In 1941, in response to Swedish Air Force requirements, the Swedish aviation company SAAB commenced work on a radical new fighter. The company envisioned an unorthodox twin-boom pusher configuration fighter aircraft, featuring a low wing, a tricycle landing gear, and with a heavy forward-firing armament. It was powered by a licensed version of the new German Daimler-Benz DB 605B inline piston engine, which was refined and built by Svenska Flygmotor AB. The Swedish Air Force designated it the J 21, and a prototype was flown on 30 July 1943.

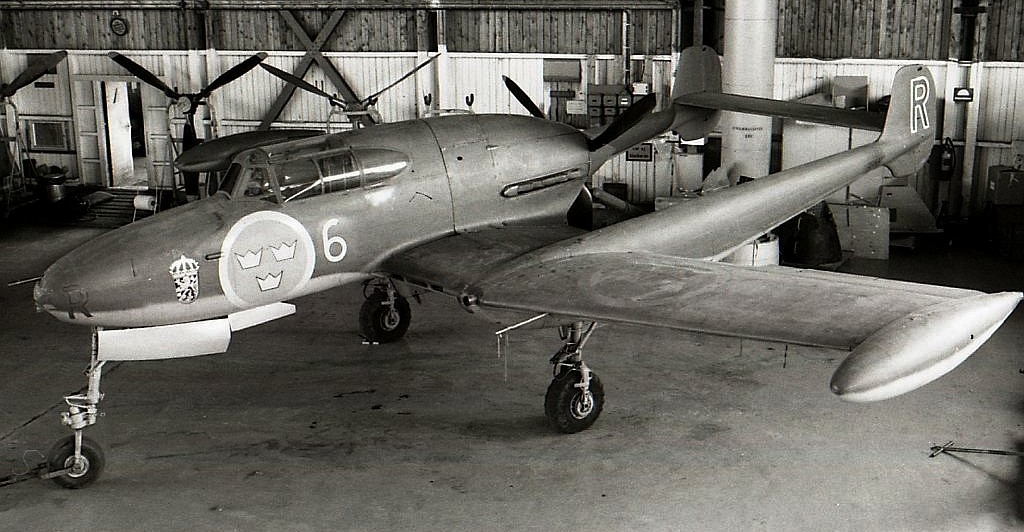
Saab 21A-3, the piston powered, pusher configuration fighter design that would be converted into the jet powered 21R

By 1945, options were being explored to improve its performance. Many of these involved the substitution of the 605B engine with a more powerful powerplant. During the first half of the year, a variant was planned with a 2,000 hp (1,500 kW) Rolls-Royce Griffon engine which would have raised the top speed to 416 mph (669 km/h). Other projects, such as the SAAB 27, were intended to use the Griffon as well, but by the end of the year, all work on the piston-engine design was abandoned.

In parallel with the piston-engine studies, SAAB and other Swedish companies had been evaluating a new type of engine - the jet engine. Two early studies, RX 1 and RX 2, had been studied, both of which being twin-boom aircraft similar to the 21. Recognising the Swedish Air Force's enthusiasm for a jet-powered aircraft for late 1945, SAAB decided to produce a version of the 21 harnessing jet propulsion. A design study was initiated for converting the J 21A to jet power. It was recognized that Sweden would otherwise be left behind while nations such as the United Kingdom already had the Gloster Meteor and de Havilland Vampire in production.

The design study was proceeding in late 1945 despite no specific engine having been chosen, but the opportunity came up to purchase a license to manufacture the "Goblin 2" turbojet engine in Sweden. This was the first jet engine to be used by the Swedish Air Force, who designated it as the RM1. The first flight of Saab's first jet aircraft, a converted J 21, was on 10 March 1947, powered with a single Goblin 2 engine. The results of the flight test programme were largely satisfactory.

=== Conversion programme ===
During 1947, SAAB began to receive piston-engined J 21s to convert them to jet propulsion. This requiring each aircraft to be extensively modified. In all, in over 50 per cent of the airframe, tailplane and wing was changed and, each of them was equipped with a single British-sourced de Havilland Goblin turbojet engine, which replaced the DB 605B and propeller unit. It became the Swedish Air Force's first jet aircraft. In light of the extensive changes, rebuilt 21s were redesignated J 21R.

Many changes were made to accommodate the Goblin engine, which had considerably different properties and requirements than the DB 605B engine. The horizontal stabilizer had to be raised to clear the jet engine's exhaust, which required that the tail section be redesigned. Additionally, to feed the thirsty turbojet, the fuel capacity was increased significantly with additional tanks in the wing centre section and wingtip tanks. The fighter's aerodynamics were improved during the rebuild, with a curved windscreen, and a modified wing leading edge. Air brakes were added as an additional flap on the outer wing's trailing edge. The ejection seat, which was a relatively new innovation, received various improvements that enabled it to eject at higher speeds.

The A 21R attack version could now carry 14.5 and 18 cm (5.7 and 7.1 in) ground attack rockets installed underneath the wing centre section. An alternative external paddan ("the toad") gunpod could be mounted under the wing centre section instead of the rockets. The gunpod contained eight 8 mm (0.31 in) ksp m/22 machine guns with 800 rounds of ammunition per two magazines (400 per magazine) feeding each gun with 100 rounds. The fire control system allowed all installed guns and all the rockets or the gunpod to be fired at once.

A production run of 124 aircraft was planned, including four prototypes. When F 10 wing had gained experience with the type, it was concluded that all of the aircraft were to be attack aircraft and the production batch was reduced to 64 aircraft. Of these, 34 fighters were designated J 21RA, powered by the 1,360 kg (3,000 lb) Goblin 2 engine, or RM1 in Sweden. These were later re-designated as A 21RA. The remaining 30 were designated A 21RB. These were powered by a Swedish-built 1,500 kg (3,300 lb) Goblin 3 or RM1A engine.

== Operational history ==
The first prototype Saab 21R first flew on 10 March 1947, almost 2 years after the Second World War. The aircraft first entered service with F 10 in August 1950. Although the type was intended as a fighter aircraft, the Saab J 29 was flying by October 1948, so the order was reduced to 60, and all 21Rs were eventually converted to attack aircraft as A 21RA or A 21RB depending on the engine type.

== Variants ==
- J 21RA – First production series, intended as fighters, powered by British-built de Havilland Goblin II engines, 34 built in 1950 (including four prototypes)
  - A 21RA – J 21RA redesignated as attackers in 1951 and modified to carry external attack ordnance, retired in 1953
- J 21RB – Second production series, intended as fighters, powered by Swedish-built de Havilland Goblin III engines, 30 built between 1950 and 1952
  - A 21RB – J 21RB redesignated as attackers in 1951 and modified to carry external attack ordnance, retired in 1956

== Operators ==
Sweden

- Swedish Air Force
  - F7 Såtenäs, 1950–54: A21RA/B
  - F10 Ängelholm, 1949–51: J21RA
  - F17 Kallinge, 1954–56: A21RA/B

== Surviving aircraft ==
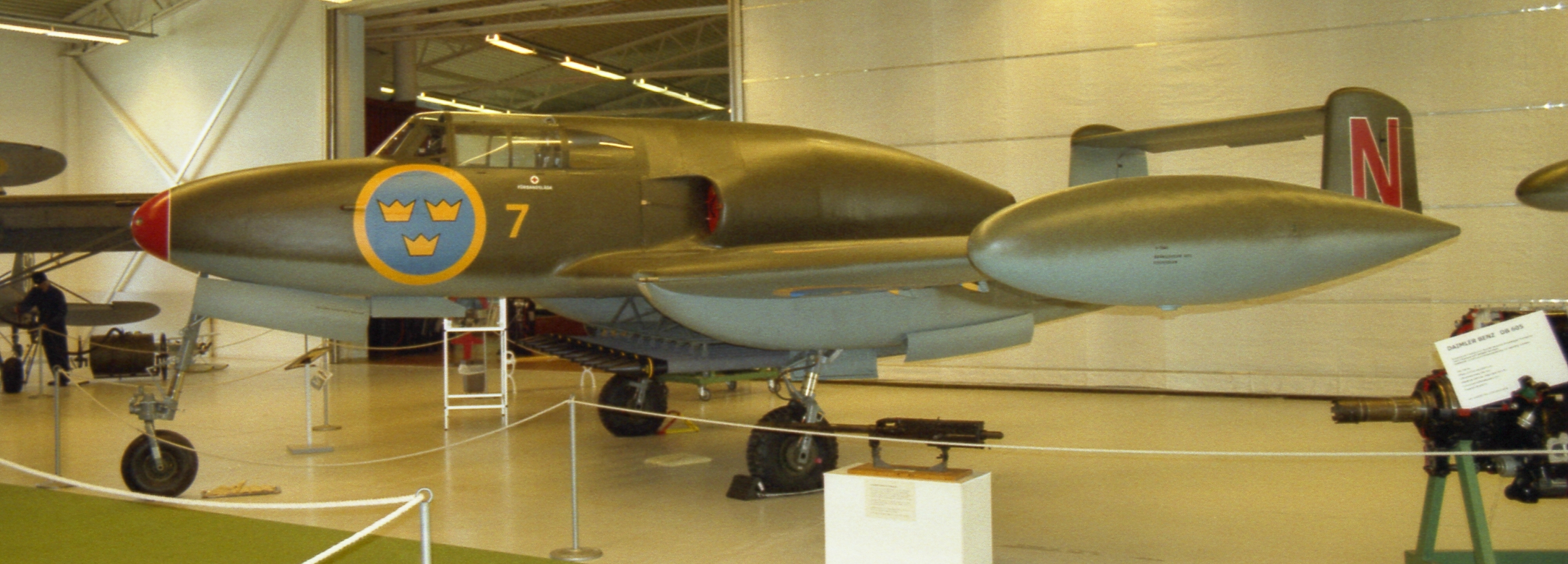
J 21A-3 rebuilt to represent an A 21R at the Swedish Air Force Museum

No original examples survived after being taken out of service, however, in the 1990s a group of volunteers took a surviving derelict Saab 21 airframe and rebuilt it into a 21R for display at the Swedish Air Force Museum.

== Specifications (Saab 21RA) ==
Drawing of Saab J-21R

Data from Beskrivning över fpl typ 21R, häfte 1 (description of airplane type 21R, booklet 1), Beskrivning över fpl typ 21R, häfte 6 kap L. Beväpning (description of airplane type 21R, booklet 6, chapter L. armament), SAAB J21/J21R

General characteristics

- Crew: 1
- Length: 10.55 m (34 ft 7 in) including 20mm cannon
- Wingspan: 11.37 m (37 ft 4 in)
- Height: 2.9 m (9 ft 6 in)
- Wing area: 22.1 m^{2} (238 sq ft)
- Airfoil: Saab laminar airfoil
- Empty weight: 3,090 kg (6,812 lb)
- Gross weight: 4,340 kg (9,568 lb)
- Max takeoff weight: 5,615 kg (12,379 lb)
- Fuel capacity: 1,690 L (450 US gal; 370 imp gal) total maximum; 590 L (160 US gal; 130 imp gal) in fuselage tank, 300 L (79 US gal; 66 imp gal) in wing tanks and 800 L (210 US gal; 180 imp gal) in optional tip tanks
- Powerplant: 1 × de Havilland Goblin II (Svenska Flygmotor RM1) centrifugal-flow turbojet engine, 13.24 kN (2,980 lbf) thrust J 21RA / A 21RA

Performance

- Maximum speed: 800 km/h (500 mph, 430 kn)
- Cruise speed: 610 km/h (380 mph, 330 kn)
- Minimum control speed: 155 km/h (96 mph, 84 kn)
- Range: 450 km (280 mi, 240 nmi) internal tanks only
- Ferry range: 900 km (560 mi, 490 nmi) with drop tanks
- Service ceiling: 12,000 m (39,000 ft)
- Rate of climb: 17 m/s (3,300 ft/min)
- Take-off run: 650 m (2,133 ft)

Armament

- Guns
  - 1 × 20 mm automatkanon m/45 (20 mm akan m/45) – 20 mm (0.79 in) gun in the nose with 140 rounds
  - 4 × 13,2 mm automatkanon m/45A (13,2 mm akan m/39A) – 13.2 mm (0.52 in) guns, two in the nose with 350 rounds per gun and two in the wings with 325 rounds per gun (early on retrofitted with 12,7 mm barrels for 12.7×99 ammunition)
- Belly maximum 700 kg (1,543 lb); loadouts:
  - 1 × gunpod – tillsatslavett "paddan" (add-on mount "the toad") – with 8 × 8 mm kulspruta m/22 (8 mm ksp m/22) – 8 mm (0.31 in) machine guns with 100 rounds per gun
  - 1 × rocket mount for 10 × "light" rockets or 5 × "heavy" rockets:
    - 10 × 8 cm pansarraket m/46C (8 cm prak m/46C) – 8 cm (3.1 in) 25 lb AP Mk II RP-3 Armour Piercing rockets
    - 10 × 14,5 cm pansarsprängraket m/49B (14,5 cm psrak m/49B) – 14.5 cm (5.7 in) high-explosive anti-tank rockets
    - 10 × 15 cm sprängraket m/51 (15 cm srak m/51), m/51A, m/51B – 15 cm (5.9 in) high explosive rockets
    - 5 × 18 cm halvpansarraket m/49B (18 cm hprak m/49B) – 18 cm (7.1 in) semi armour-piercing rockets
- Wingtips
  - 2 × vingspetstank (drop tanks) which could be used as incendiary bombs and were tested with napalm

== See also ==
Related development

- Saab 21

Aircraft of comparable role, configuration, and era

- de Havilland Vampire
- de Havilland Venom
- Focke-Wulf Flitzer

Related lists

- List of fighter aircraft
- List of military aircraft of Sweden
- List of twin-boom aircraft
- List of pusher aircraft by configuration
