= Catalina affair =

1952 Cold War–era diplomatic crisis

Flight 27
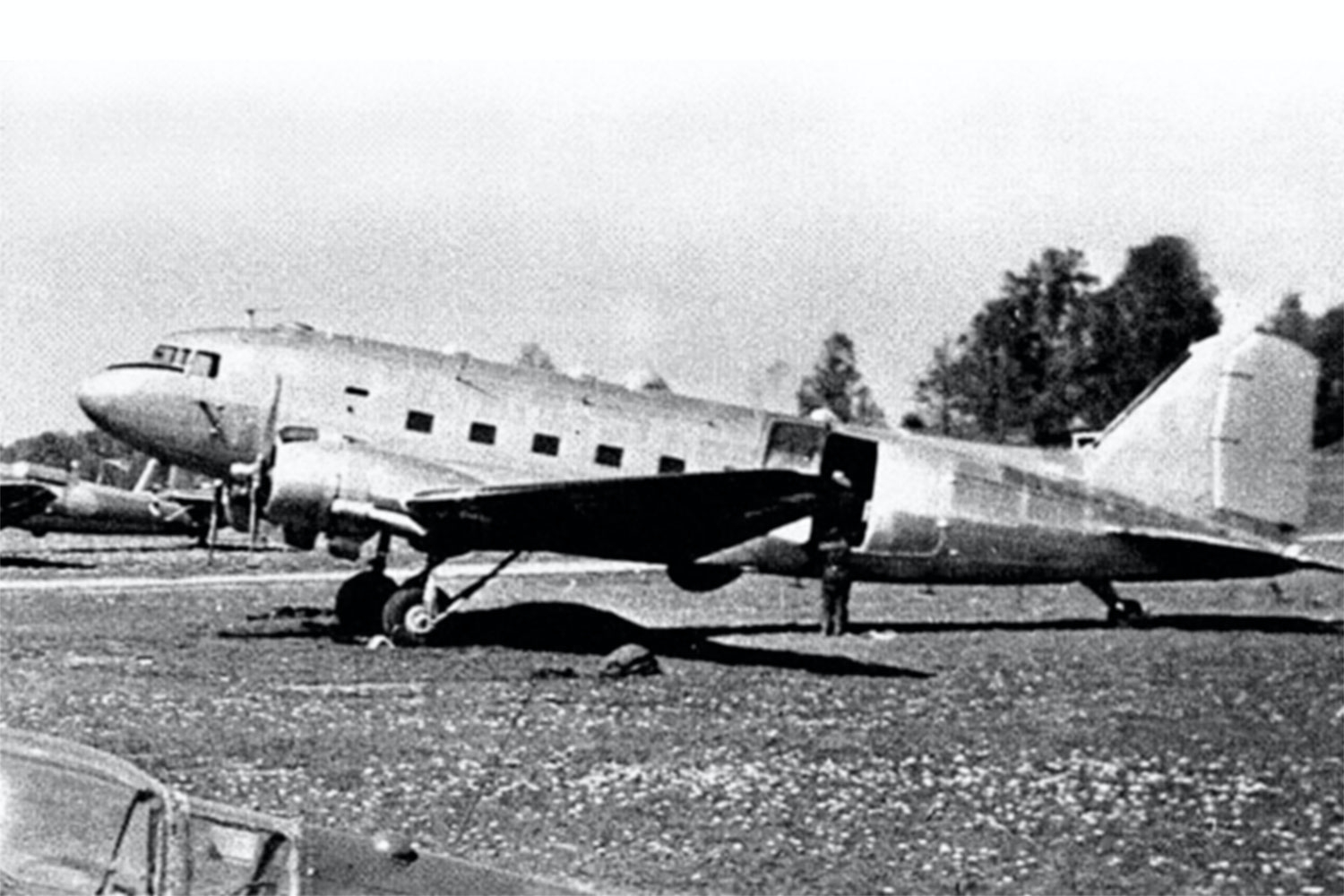
- Tp 79 Hugin at F 8 Barkarby in 1951

Incident
- Date: 13 June 1952
- Summary: Shot down
- Site: East of Gotska Sandön; 58°23′31″N 20°17′28″E

Aircraft
- Aircraft type: DC-3A-360 Skytrain
- Aircraft name: Hugin
- Operator: Swedish Air Force
- Flight origin: Stockholm Bromma Airport; Stockholm, Sweden
- Destination: Stockholm Bromma Airport
- Passengers: 0
- Crew: 8
- Fatalities: 8
- Survivors: 0

Catalina affair
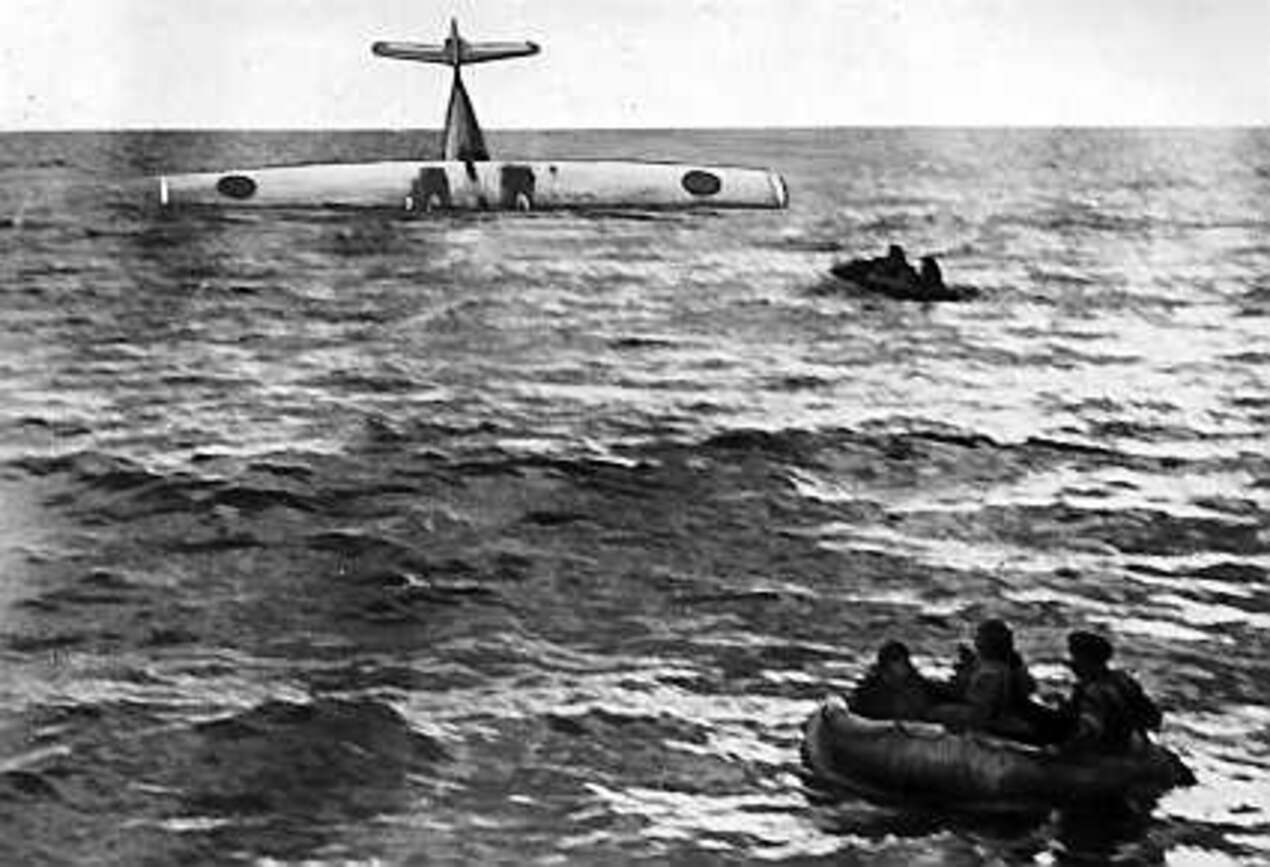
- The Catalina shot down by Soviet forces while searching for the missing Hugin

Incident
- Date: 16 June 1952
- Summary: Shot down
- Site: East of Gotska Sandön

Aircraft
- Aircraft type: PBY-5 Catalina
- Operator: Swedish Air Force
- Flight origin: F 2 Hägernäs near Stockholm, Sweden
- Destination: F 2 Hägernäs
- Passengers: 0
- Crew: 7
- Fatalities: 0

The Catalina affair (Swedish: Catalinaaffären) was a military confrontation and Cold War-era diplomatic crisis in June 1952, in which Soviet Air Force fighter jets shot down two Swedish aircraft over international waters in the Baltic Sea.

The first aircraft to be shot down was an unarmed Swedish Air Force Tp 79, a derivative of the Douglas DC-3, carrying out radio and radar signals intelligence-gathering for the National Defence Radio Establishment (Försvarets radioanstalt, FRA). None of the crew of eight survived.

The second aircraft to be shot down was a Swedish Air Force Tp 47, a Catalina flying boat, involved in the search and rescue operation for the missing DC-3. The Catalina's crew of seven were saved.

The Soviet Union publicly denied involvement until its dissolution in 1991. Both aircraft were located in 2003; the DC-3 was salvaged.

== Aircraft and crew ==
=== DC-3 ===
The first aircraft involved was a Swedish Air Force Douglas DC-3A-360 Skytrain, a military transport derivative of the DC-3 known in Swedish service as Tp 79. It carried the serial number 79001.

The aircraft was manufactured in 1943 with original US serial number 42-5694, and was delivered to USAAF 15th Troop Carrier Squadron (61st Troop Carrier Group). It saw action in northern Africa before being stationed at RAF Barkston Heath. It was flown on 5 February 1946, from Orly Air Base via Hanau Army Airfield to Bromma and was registered as SE-APZ on 18 May 1946 as a civil aircraft to Skandinaviska Aero AB.

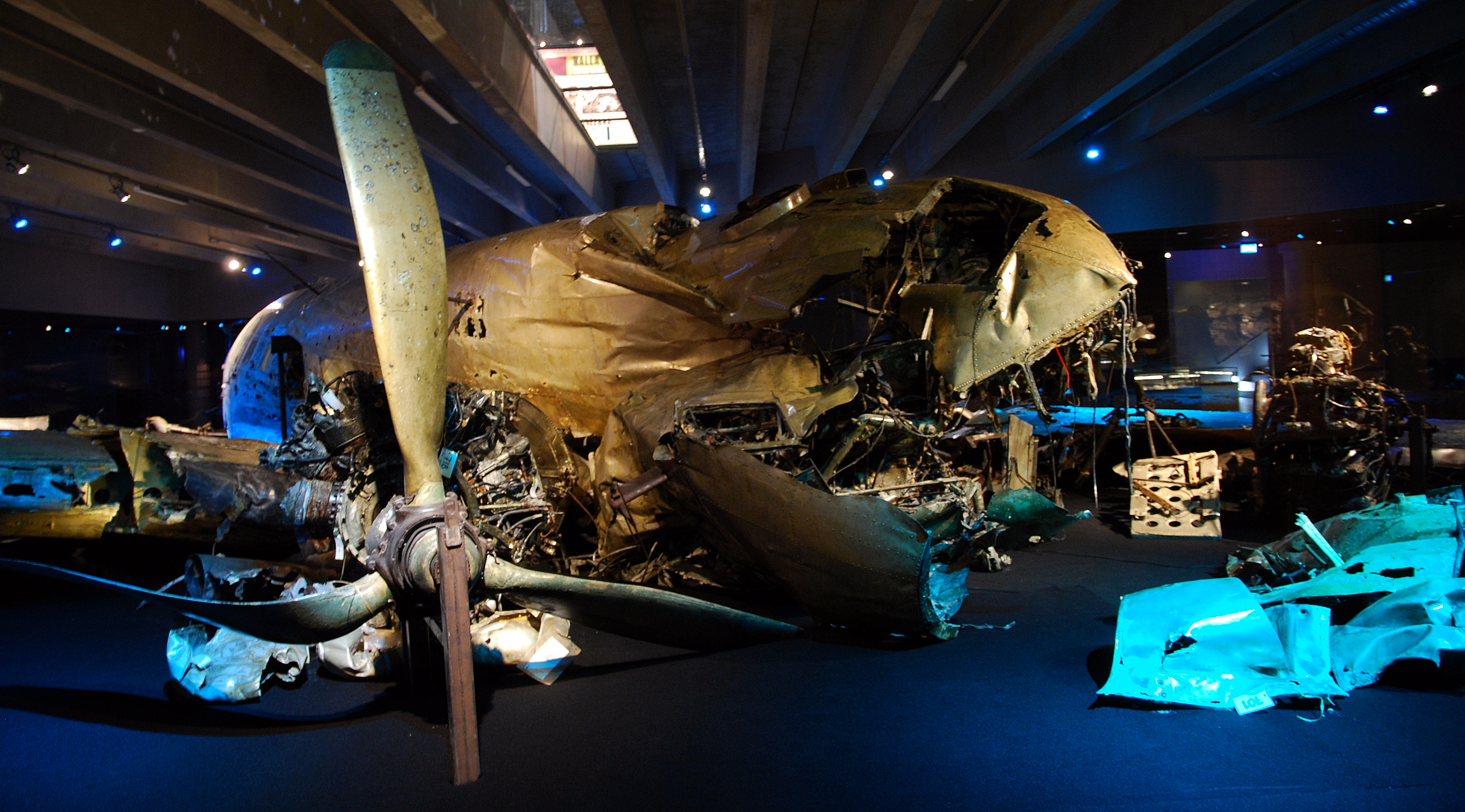
DC-3 wreckage exhibited at the Swedish Air Force Museum

On 13 June 1952, it disappeared east of the isle of Gotska Sandön while carrying out signals intelligence-gathering operations for FRA. The aircraft was lost with its entire crew of eight in the incident. Three of the eight crew members were military personnel from the Swedish Air Force, and the other five were civilian signals intelligence (SIGINT) operators from the FRA.

=== Catalina ===
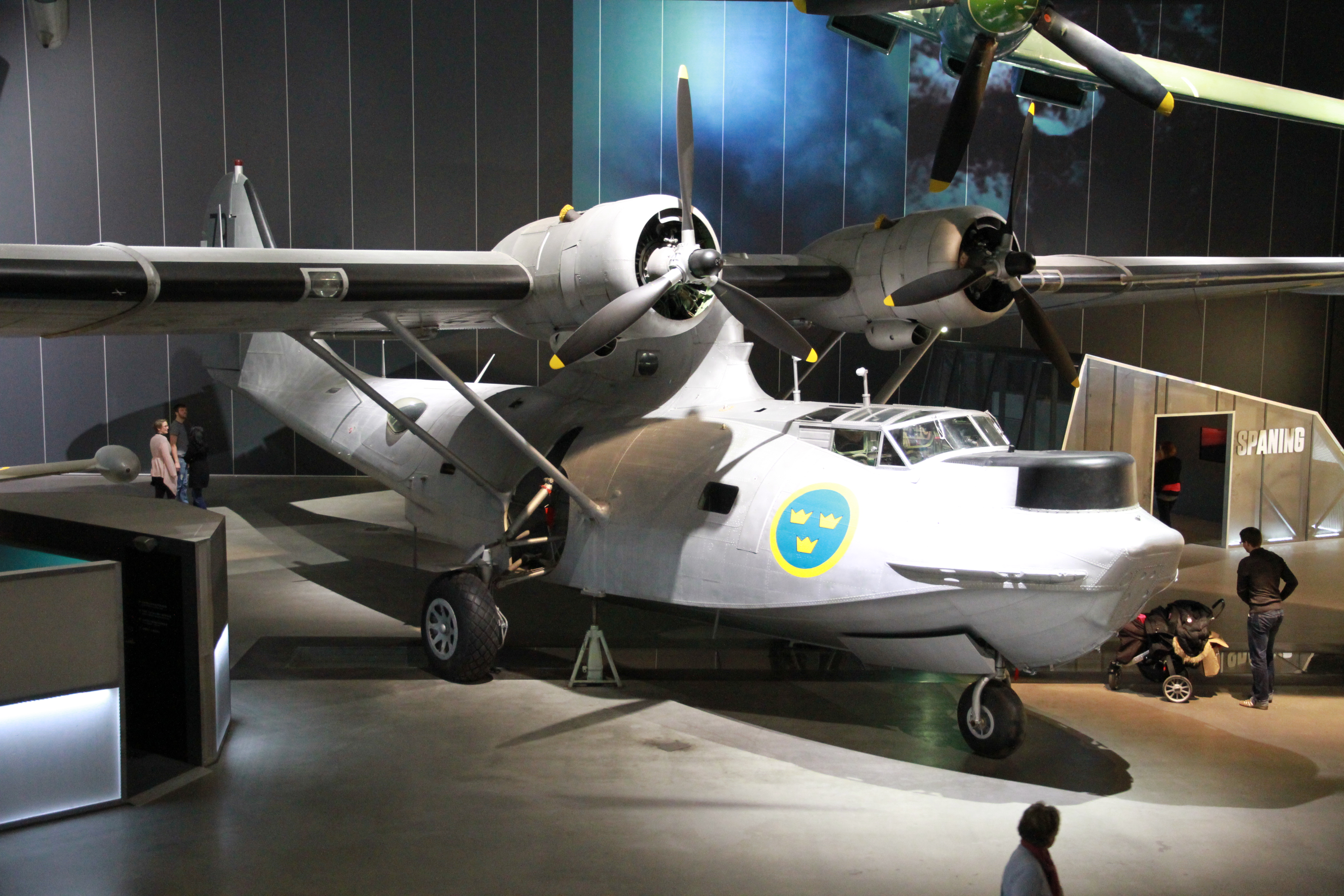
Tp 47 Canso (Catalina) at the Swedish Air Force Museum

Three days after the initial incident, on 16 June 1952, two Consolidated PBY-5 Catalina flying boats, known in Swedish service as Tp 47, searched for the DC-3 north of Estonia. One of the aircraft, carrying airframe serial No. 47002, was shot down by Soviet aircraft, but the crew of seven ditched near the West German freighter Münsterland and were rescued.

== Aftermath ==
Sweden maintained for nearly 40 years that the DC-3 was undertaking a navigation training flight.

Only after pressure from crewmembers' families did Swedish authorities confirm that the DC-3 was equipped with British equipment and had been conducting surveillance for NATO. In 1991, General Fyodor Shinkarenko, a colonel of the Soviet Air Forces in the early 1950s, admitted he had ordered the DC-3 shot down in 1952 by scrambling a MiG-15bis to intercept it.

== Recovery ==
On 10 June 2003, airline captain and former Swedish Air Force pilot Anders Jallai and historian Carl Douglas with the Swedish company Marin Mätteknik AB found the remains of the downed DC-3 by using sonar at 126 m (413 ft) depth.

After 52 years, the remains of the DC-3 were lifted to the surface on 19 March 2004. Debris from the area was also recovered by freeze dredging—200 m^{3} (7,100 cu ft) of surrounding sediment was frozen and lifted together with the object on and in it. The wreck was transferred to Muskö Naval Base for investigation and preservation; it was finally put on display at the Swedish Air Force Museum, Linköping on 13 May 2009. A 1:12 scale model of 79001 was loaned to the Air Force Museum on 5 May 2009.

== Conclusion ==
Bullet holes on 79001 showed that the DC-3 was shot down by a MiG-15bis fighter. The exact splashdown time was also determined, as one of the clocks in the cockpit had stopped at 11:28:40 CET. The remains of four of the eight-man crew have been found and positively identified.

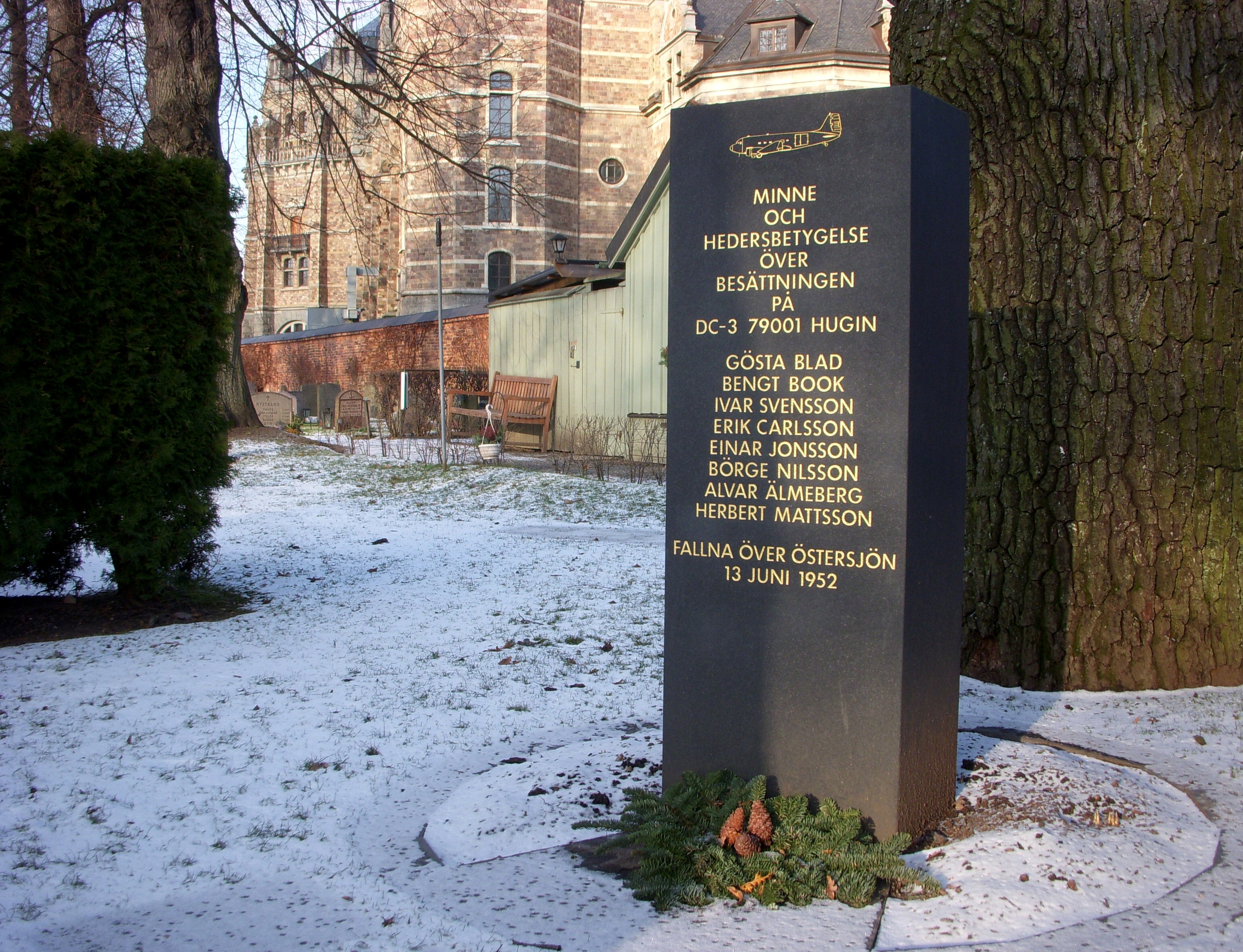
Memorial stone to the fallen crew at Galärvarvskyrkogården in Stockholm

== See also ==
- "Whiskey on the rocks"
