= Frid Wänström =

Swedish aviation engineer

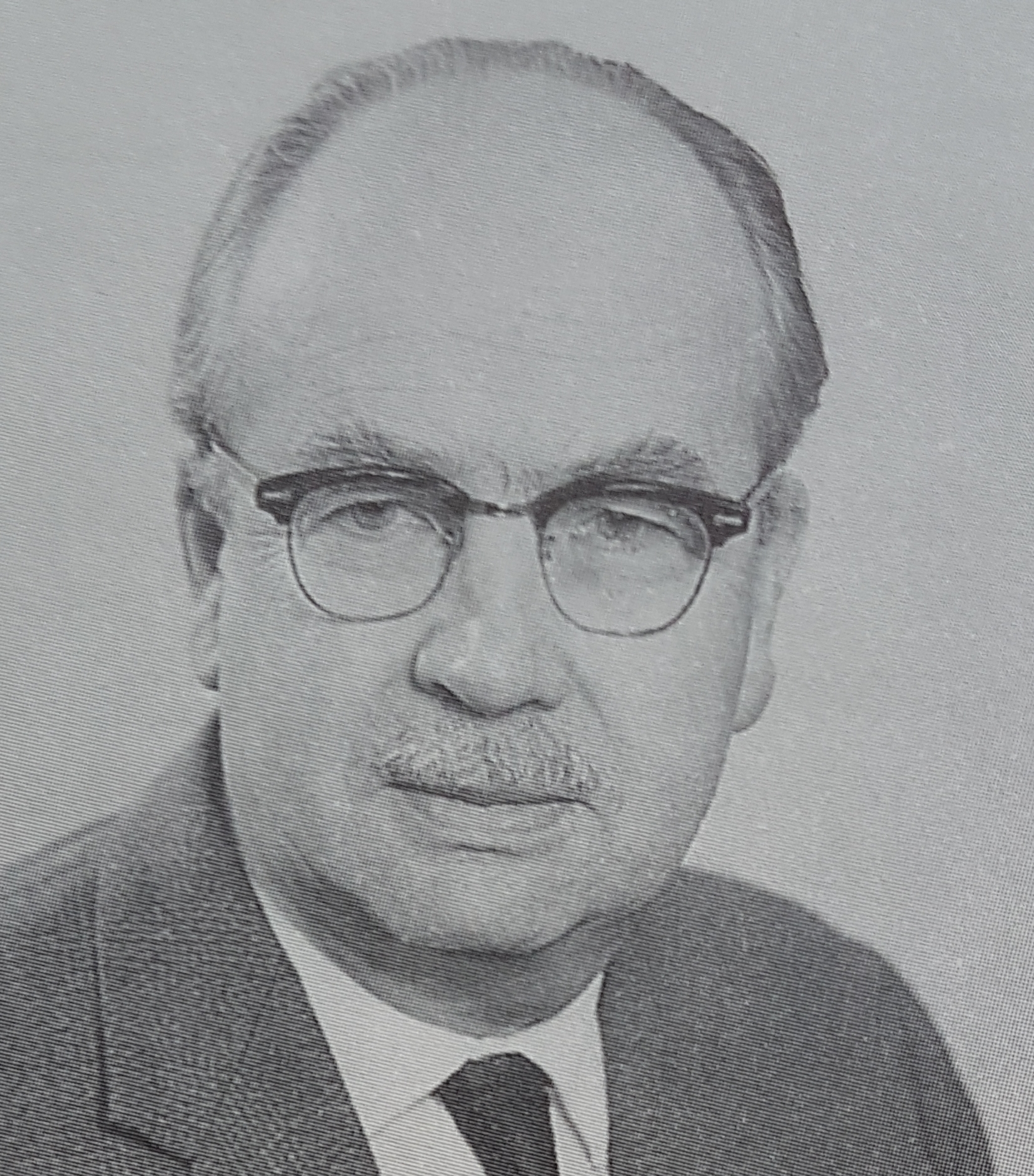
Frid Wänström

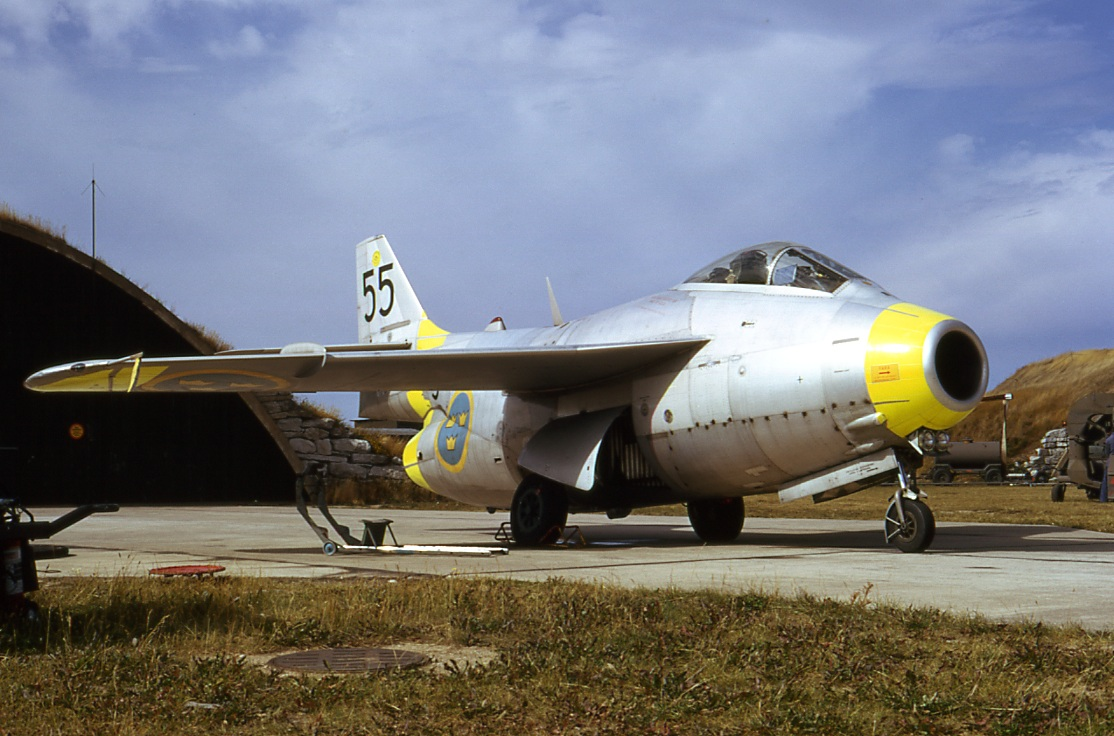
Saab 29 Tunnan

Frid Benjamin Filippus Wänström (May 8, 1905, Lidköping – September 11, 1988, Linköping) was a Swedish aviation engineer who after KTH Royal Institute of Technology in 1932 was employed by the flygstyrelsen (predecessor to Royal Swedish Air Force Materiel Administration), from 1936 head of the calculation department Saab AB in Linköping.

Wänström is mentioned for leading the work with Saab 29 Tunnan. It was the first fighter aircraft in Sweden with swept wings. Information about arrow wings came from Switzerland and should have included drawings on Messerschmitts Me P1101, P1110, P1111 and P1112. SAAB:s project manager Wänström fetched these secret papers from Switzerland to Sweden in 1945. The documents came from engineers from Messerschmitt who moved to Switzerland at the end of World War II.

Wänström also participated in the following Saab projects Saab 32 Lansen, Saab 35 Draken and Saab 37 Viggen.

Wänström was awarded the Swedish Aeronautical Society's Thulin Medal both in silver 1948 and in gold in 1968, and contributed to the formation of the Saab Veterans Association. He is buried in Vårdnäs cemetery.
