= Saab 29 Tunnan =

1948 Swedish fighter aircraft family

Saab 29 Tunnan Flygande Tunnan / The Flying Barrel
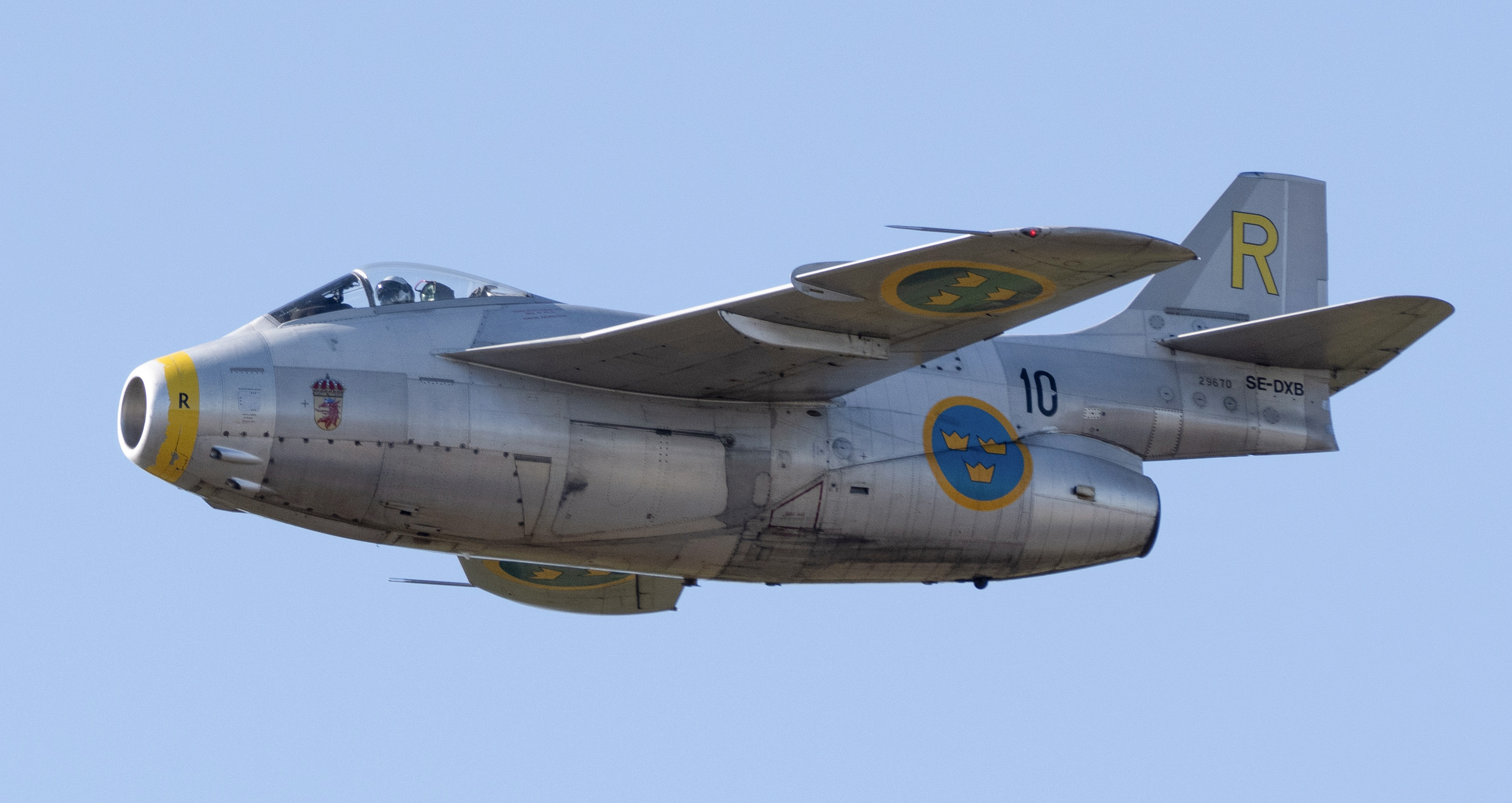

General information
- Type: Fighter
- National origin: Sweden
- Manufacturer: Svenska Aeroplan Aktiebolaget (SAAB)
- Primary users: Swedish Air Force Austrian Air Force
- Number built: 661

History
- Manufactured: 1948–1956
- Introduction date: 1951
- First flight: 1 September 1948
- Retired: 1976

The Saab 29 Tunnan ("The Barrel"), colloquially Flygande Tunnan, or The Flying Barrel in English, (Note: The names of Swedish combat aircraft, like Viggen or Draken, are in the definite form while non-combat aircraft like Saab Safir are in indefinite form.) (Note: The aircraft's nickname has commonly been translated into English as "The Flying Barrel" since the 1950s.) is an early jet-powered fighter aircraft designed and produced by the Swedish aircraft manufacturer Saab. It was the second turbojet-powered combat aircraft to be developed in Sweden, the first being the Saab 21R, and it was the first Western European fighter to be produced with a swept wing after the Second World War, only being preceded in Western Europe as a whole by the Messerschmitt Me 262 built during the conflict.

Work on what would become the Tunnan commenced in late 1945. The design, internally designated R 1001, had a barrel-like fuselage due to being powered by the recently developed de Havilland Ghost turbojet engine, giving it the distinctive rotund appearance from which its name is derived. A relatively thin swept wing configuration was adopted after wartime aerodynamic research from Germany indicated its favourable high speed qualities. The Swedish Air Force placed an initial order for three prototypes under the service designation J 29 during Autumn 1946. On 1 September 1948, the first prototype performed its maiden flight; flight testing proved the aircraft to exceed performance estimates in several aspects.

During May 1951, Bråvalla Wing (F 13) received the first production aircraft. Five principal variants of the Tunnan were produced; the first model to enter service being the J 29A fighter, the more capable J 29B and J 29E fighters, and finally the afterburner-equipped J 29F fighter. A dedicated aerial reconnaissance model, the S 29C, was also produced. During the 1960s, several J 29Bs saw combat while stationed in the Republic of Congo as Sweden's contribution to a UN peacekeeping mission (ONUC). The Austrian Air Force also operated the type. In service, the J 29 proved to be relatively fast and agile. The Swedish Air Force operated the type in both fighter and fighter-bomber roles into the 1970s.

== Development ==
Sweden had fallen behind the rapid technical progress being made elsewhere, and Saab needed to catch up in terms of aerodynamics and jet propulsion. Accordingly, project "JxR" was initiated in late 1945 and requirements were drawn up in October 1945. A pair of proposals were presented by the Saab design team, led by Lars Brising. The first of these, codenamed R 101, nicknamed cigarren ("the cigar") due to its shape, bore a strong resemblance to the American Lockheed P-80 Shooting Star. The second design, which was chosen, was the barrel-shaped design, codenamed R 1001, which proved to be both faster and more agile. The nickname "the barrel" evolved early from this design, but for a while it also had the nickname tusen och en natt ("One Thousand and One Nights") after the project number 1001.

The R 1001 concept had a straight wing, but after the engineers obtained German swept wing research data, it was given a 25 degree sweep. Information on swept wings came through Switzerland and included drawings for the Messerschmitt P.1101, P.1110, P.1111 and P.1112. SAAB's project manager, Frid Wänström, collected these documents in 1945 from Messerschmitt engineers who escaped to Switzerland at the end of the War. Among them was engineer and aerodynamicist Hermann Behrbohm, who joined Saab's J 29 team. These documents clearly indicated delta and swept-wing designs "reduc[e] drag dramatically as the aircraft approached the sound barrier."

To make the wing as thin as possible, the undercarriage retracted into the fuselage, rather than the wings. Wind tunnel testing at the Swedish Royal University of Technology and by the National Aeronautical Research Institute also influenced its aerodynamics. These tests determined the required fuselage form to ensure it could attain the targeted critical Mach number, as well as supporting the use of a straight-through airflow to maximize thrust. Automatically locking leading edge slots, interconnected with the flaps, were also deemed necessary for lateral stability during take-off and landing. To further verify the swept wing, a Saab Safir was modified with a full-scale wing as the Saab 201. The finalized design, incorporating the new information was drawn up in January 1946.

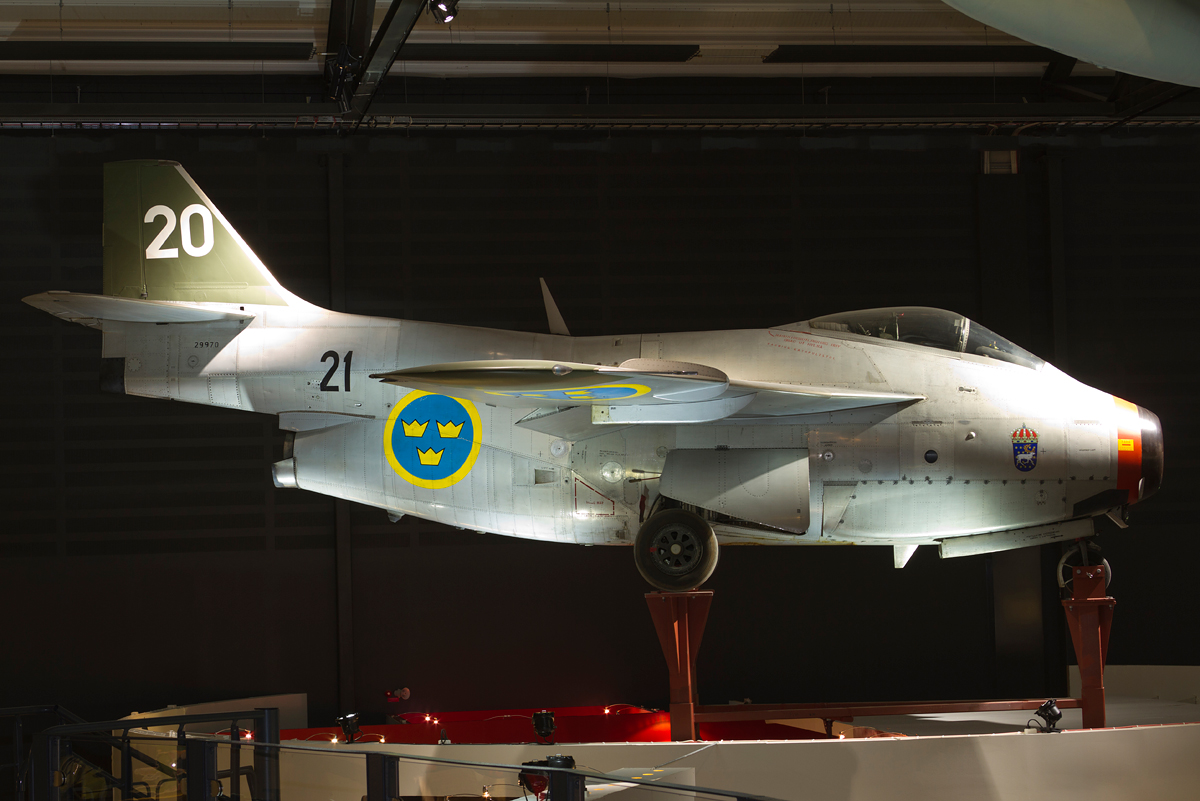
Saab S 29C Tunnan at Swedish Air Force Museum, Linköping

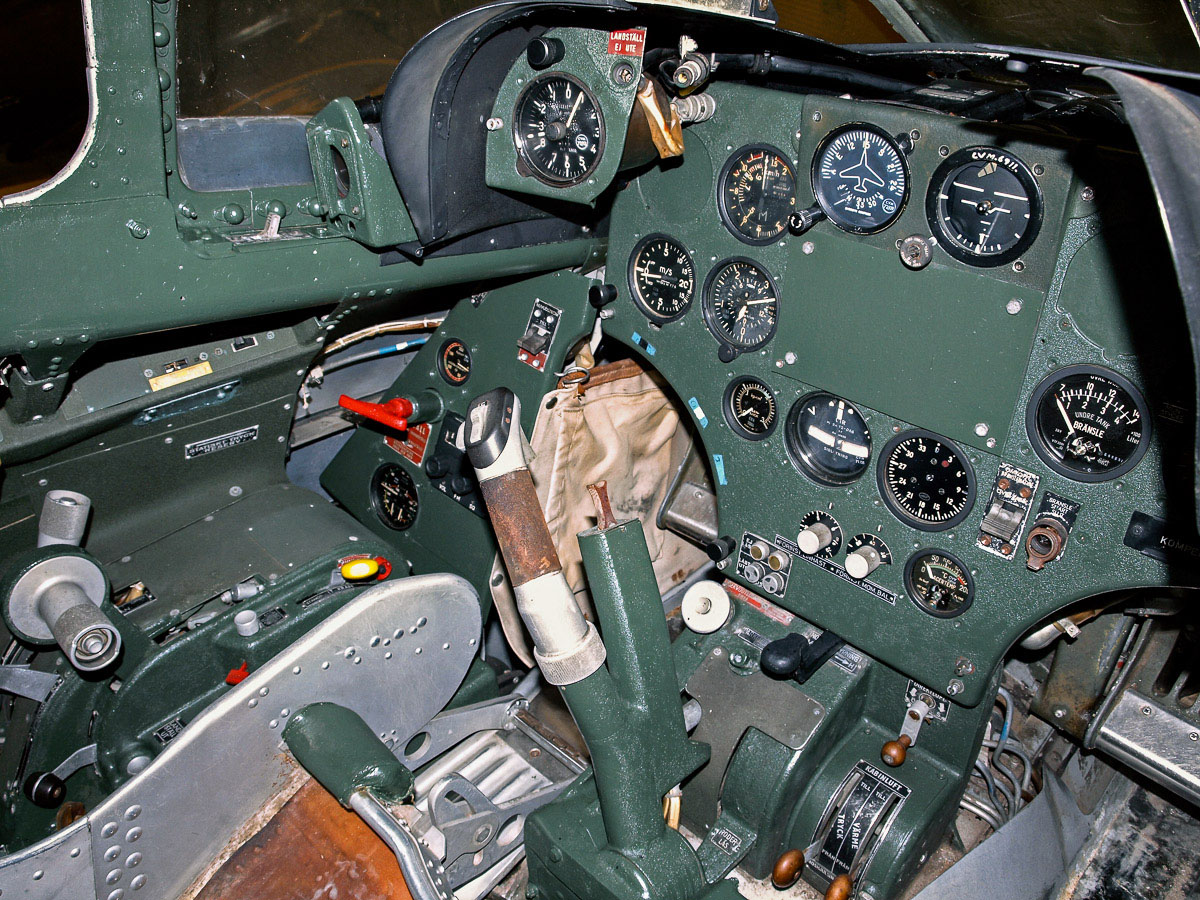
The cockpit of a J 29F, 2013

The original powerplant was to have been the de Havilland Goblin turbojet, however, in December 1945, the more powerful de Havilland Ghost became available. This was ideal as not only was the Ghost set up for a circular air intake, its diameter would fit within the planned fuselage. Following negotiations between de Havilland and Saab, the Ghost engine was selected to power the type.

Despite early doubts for the supply of an equivalent to the American 75S aluminium alloy, Svenska Metallverken was able to manufacture it, although significantly larger sections were used than typical for aircraft construction. The structure employed heavy frames and stressed skin to meet conflicting requirements on space, strength, rigidity and accessibility.

The Swedish Air Force requested verification of the performance and a production plan for the project in February 1946. In Autumn 1946, the Swedish Air Force formally ordered three prototypes, with the type designation J 29. Static testing of the full-scale mock-up revealed problems with pressure cabin leaks, and concerning aileron behavior. A hydraulic system was installed to solve the latter issue. However, these modifications delayed the first flight until after the hoped for date of 1 August 1948.

The first flight by a Saab 29 prototype was on 1 September 1948, was made by S/L 'Bob' Moore, who was later the first managing director of Saab GB, UK. A problem with the landing gear affected the expected top speed of the aircraft. Following the flight, Moore described the aircraft as "on the ground an ugly duckling – in the air, a swift." Because of the shape of its fuselage, the Saab J 29 quickly received the nickname Flygande Tunnan ("The Flying Barrel"), or Tunnan ("The Barrel") for short. While not appreciated by SAAB, its short form was eventually adopted officially.

Four prototypes were built for the test program. The first two lacked armament, carrying heavy test equipment in their place instead. The third was armed with four 20 mm (0.79 in) cannons. Air brakes on the fuselage and on the wings behind the rear spar and both conventional and combined aileron/flap arrangements were tested. Flight tests revealed that the J 29 prototypes could exceed the maximum Mach number for which they had been designed and flight performance figures were typically in excess of predicted values.

Quantity production commenced in 1948; during May 1951, Bråvalla Wing (F 13) received the first production aircraft.

The Tunnan was produced in five main variants.

The J 29A fighter was the first model to enter service, and was followed by the J 29B and J 29E fighters, and finally the afterburner-equipped J 29F fighter, which was the final variant built. There was also a dedicated reconnaissance variant, the S 29C. Between 1950 and 1956, 661 Tunnans were completed, the largest production run for any Saab aircraft.

== Design ==
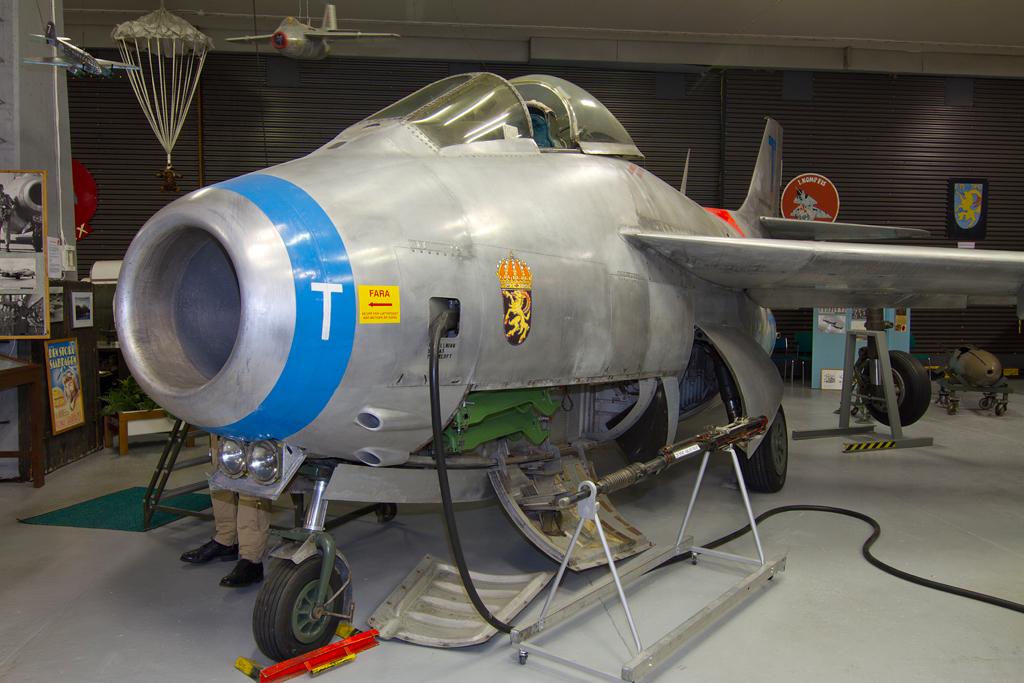
J 29F Tunnan 29666/T at Soderhamn /F 15 Aviation Museum, Söderhamn Airport

The Saab 29 Tunnan was the first Swedish aircraft to be specifically designed to use jet propulsion. Sweden's first jet fighter, the Saab 21R, had been modified from the piston-engined Saab 21. It is a small, chubby aircraft with a single round air intake in the nose, with the pilot under a bubble canopy directly above the air intake duct on the upper-forward section of the fuselage. It has a very thin mid-mounted moderately swept two-spar wing which is a single structure attached to the fuselage by four bolts. The undercarriage is hydraulically operated, and was designed to be suitable for use from rough airstrips. To improve pilot survivability, the Tunnan used an ejection seat Saab developed in 1943, with an explosive jettisoning system for the canopy.

The Tunnan is powered with a single 22.4 kN (5,000 lb_{f}) de Havilland Ghost turbojet which have a top speed in excess of 1,050 km/h (650 mph), better performance than Sweden's de Havilland Vampires. The engine was bolted to the fuselage at three points and a special trolley was used to remove the engine for maintenance. The final version had an afterburner, the first successful one used with a British jet engine.

Improvements were made to the wing to incorporate a dog-tooth leading edge, raising the critical Mach number. From 1963 onwards, all frontline J 29Fs were equipped with AIM-9 Sidewinder infrared-seeking air-to-air missiles.

== Operational history ==
=== Sweden ===
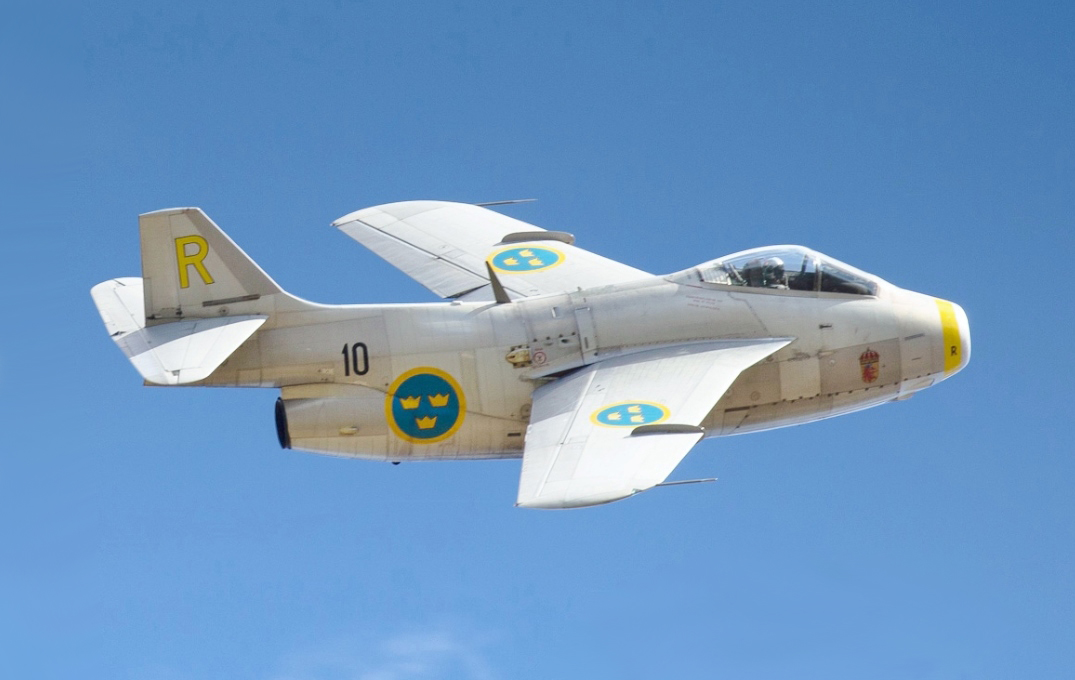
J 29F in Swedish colors

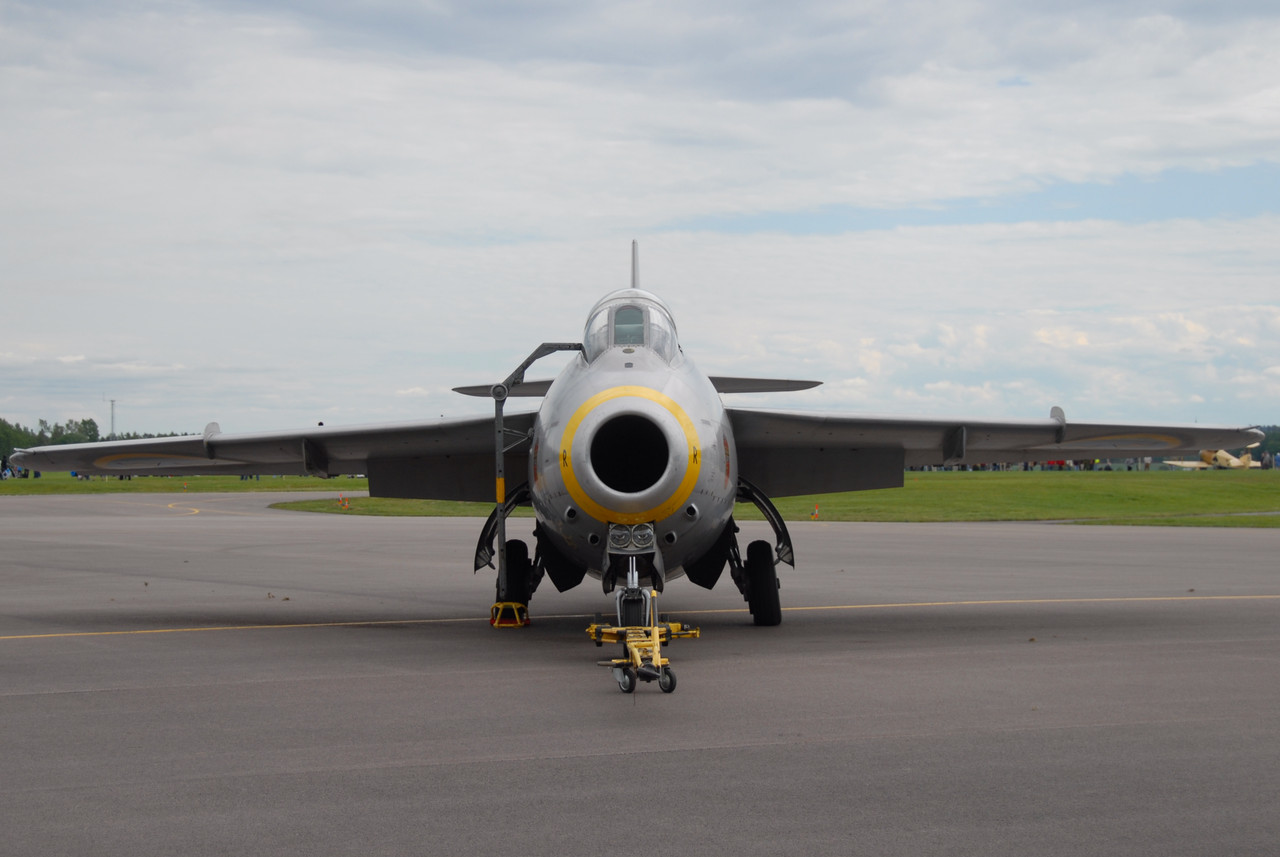
Tunnan at the Swedish Armed Forces' Airshow

The J 29 was fast and agile, and set the world speed record on a 500 km (310 mi) closed circuit in 1954 at 977 km/h (607.05 mph). Two S 29C (reconnaissance variant) additionally set an international speed record of 900.6 km/h (559.4 mph) over a 1,000 km (620 mi) closed-circuit course in 1955.

The crash record in early service was poor, mainly due to the inexperience with swept-winged aircraft and the lack of a two-seat, dual control Tunnan trainer variant: this meant that Swedish fighter pilots could only be trained using two seat variants of the de Havilland Vampire (a straight-winged jet), before going solo in a Tunnan. 99 pilots were killed during military practice flights in Sweden.

In May 1967, the fighter versions of the Tunnan were retired from combat service; however, a number of aircraft were retained and reconfigured for use as countermeasures trainers and for target towing duties into the 1970s. In August 1976, the last official military flight was performed at the Swedish Air Force's 50th anniversary air show.

==== UN operations in the Congo ====
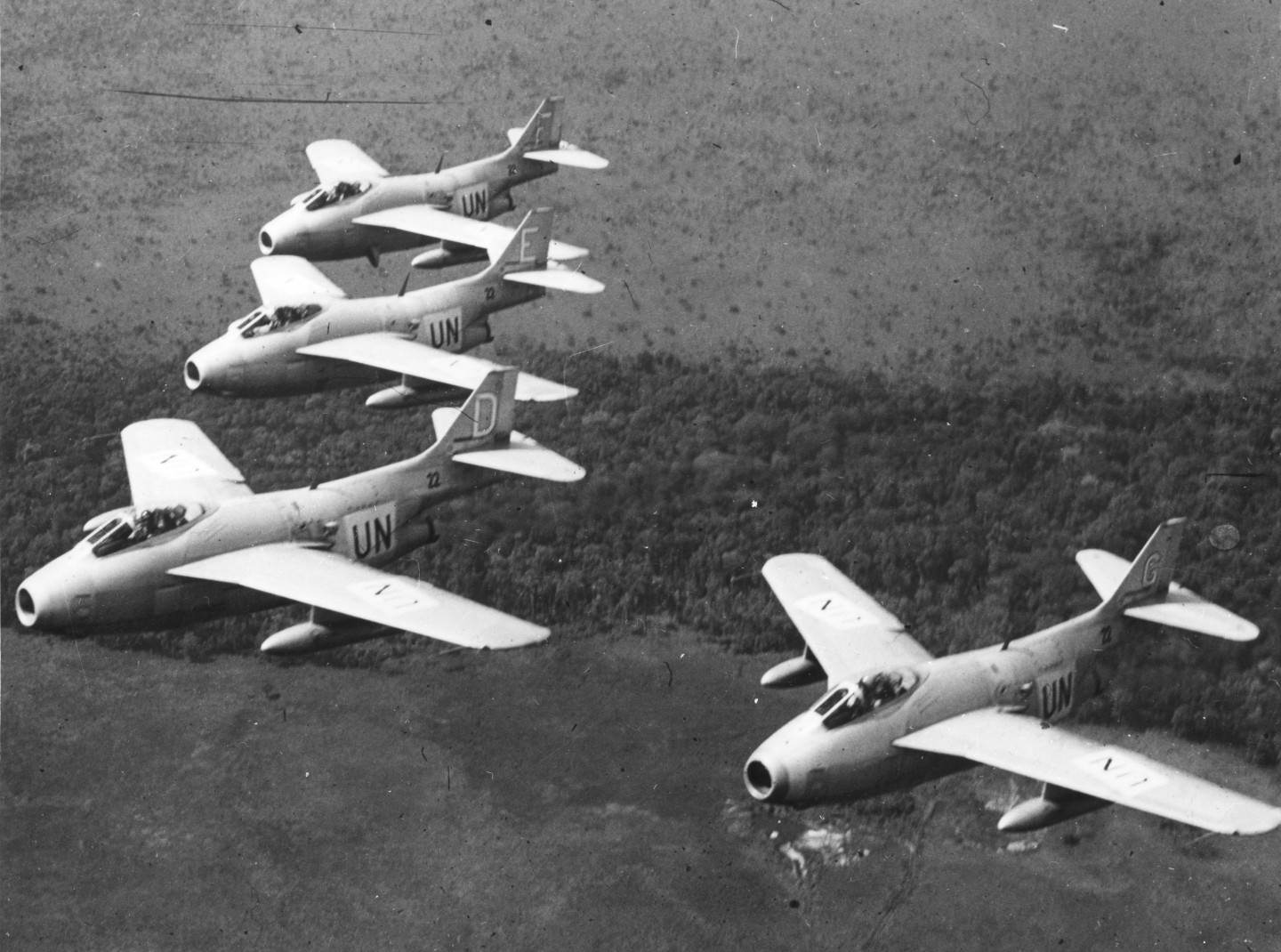
UN J 29 fighters in the Congo

The Tunnan was the first Swedish jet aircraft to see combat. In response to an appeal by the United Nations (UN) for military support in September 1961, an initial force of five J 29Bs organized as the F 22 Wing of the Swedish Air Force, were stationed in the Republic of Congo as part of Sweden's contribution to the UN peacekeeping mission in the Congo (ONUC). They were subsequently reinforced by four more J 29Bs and two S 29C photo reconnaissance Tunnans in 1962. The Tunnans received UN identifying markings on their fuselages.

Most missions involved attacking ground targets with cannons and unguided rockets but no aircraft were lost in action despite heavy ground fire. The consensus of the crews and foreign observers was that the Tunnan's capabilities were exceptional. Their secessionist adversaries used a few Fouga Magisters and other aircraft with no air combat capabilities.

Swedish pilots refused some requests for close air support to ground troops, reasoning that the risk of civilian casualties was too high. In November 1962, the Swedish air commander refused a direct order to destroy the secessionist's Fouga Magisters since they were unarmed. On the 29th of December 1963, a Saab J-29 of the 22th Squadron piloted by Ake Chritianson damaged a T-6C Texan of the Katangan Airforce with the aircraft's cannons.

The only aircraft lost was by a high-ranking officer who crashed during an aborted takeoff for a test flight. When ONUC ended in 1964, some of the Swedish aircraft were deliberately destroyed at their base, as they were no longer needed in Sweden, having been superseded by later variants, and the cost of returning them wasn't justified.

=== Austria ===
On 27 January 1961, the Swedish Government authorized the Air Board to sell 15 J 29F Tunnans to Saab for restoration and resale to the Austrian Air Force. Like the Swedish counterpart, the Saab 29 came to be colloquially called "flying barrel" (Fliegende Tonne) or just "barrel" (Tonne) in Austria.

In 1962, the sale of a further 15 J 29F aircraft to Austria was authorized. This second batch was modified so a camera pod could be installed in the port side of the nose of each aircraft, which required the removal of two cannons. The interchangeable camera pod could be exchanged in roughly 30 minutes, and the cameras could be redirected in flight from the cockpit. Due to the limitations of the 1955 Austrian State Treaty, these were never armed with air-to-air missiles. The Tunnan remained in Austrian Air Force service until 1972.

On 20 October 1964 at 9:48 a.m., two Austrian J 29Fs, of the second fighter bomber wing (2. Staffel/JaBo-Geschwader), took off from the base in Linz; the first, Bu. No. 29559 "E", was piloted by Sergeant Johan Kemetinger, the second, Bu. No. 29627 "L", was piloted by Staff Sergeant Alfred Erdler. In bad weather and a radio beacon mix-up, the pilots "smoked" and crossed the airspace of the then Czechoslovakia. Due to the bad weather, they could not even be intercepted by the emergency pair, who had to stay at the airport. The Austrian pilots thus got deep into the interior of the country and after finding that they had fuel for about the last 2 minutes of the flight, the pilots, believing that the field on which they landed was solid enough, landed in a field in the area of the village of Ořech in the Prague-West district. Coincidentally, just a few kilometres from the civilian Prague-Ruzyně airport. One machine lost its landing gear on landing, the other overturned on a ditch, the pilot was trapped and had to be rescued by people working in the field. Both pilots were returned to their homeland after two days. The planes followed them later by rail.

== Variants ==
- A – attack ("attack")
- J – jakt ("pursuit")
- S – spaning ("reconnaissance")
- SK – skol ("school")

The prefix corresponds with the designated role and does not have to correspond with a specific design: a Saab 29B equipped with attack rockets is still given the fighter prefix "J" if assigned to a fighter wing with the primary role of being a fighter, however, the same aircraft assigned to an attacker wing with the primary role of being an attacker would instead be given the attacker prefix "A".

Saab R 1001

  - J 29 – four prototypes built in 1948–1950.

Saab 29 A

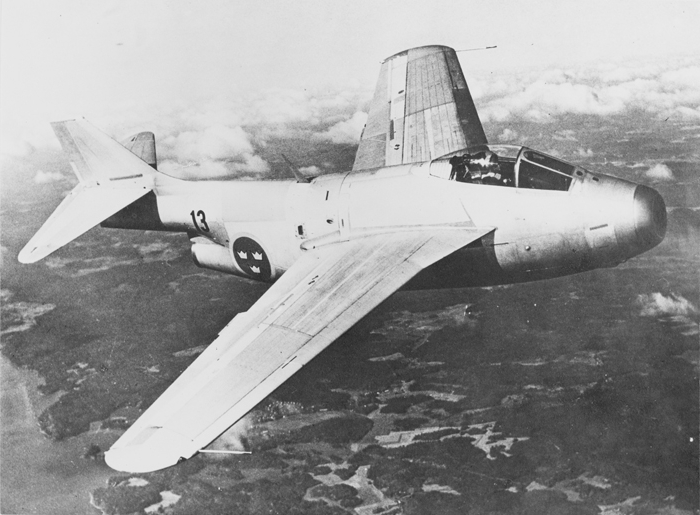
Early production model (J 29 A:1) with wing-mounted dive brakes.

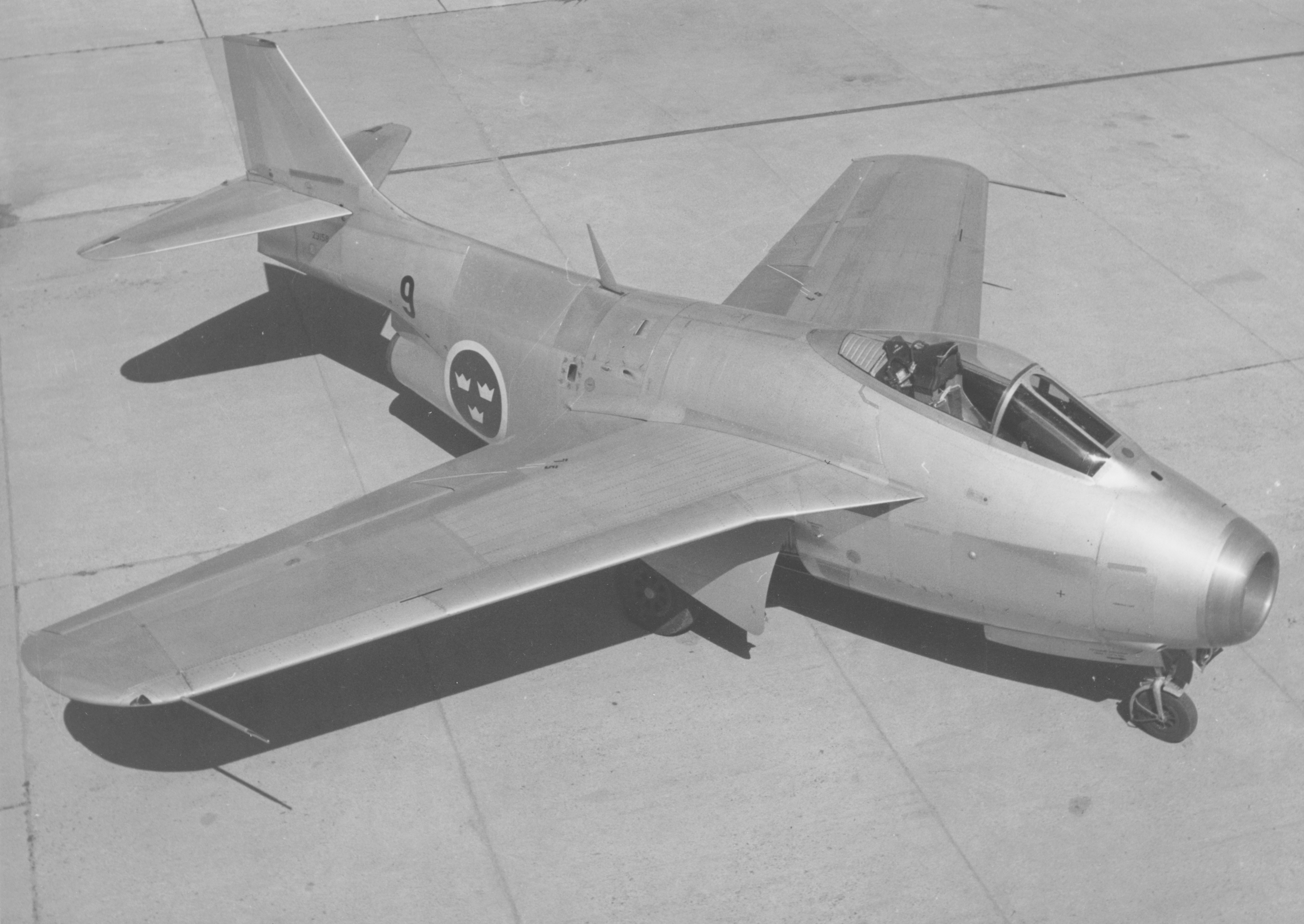
Main production model (J 29 A:2) with fuselage-mounted dive brakes.

  - J 29A1 (J 29 A:1) – fighter, 32 built from 1950 to 1951; early series with wing-mounted dive brakes.
  - J 29A2 (J 29 A:2) – fighter, 192 built from 1951 to 1954; later series with fuselage-mounted dive brakes ahead of the main landing gear doors.

Saab 29 B

  - J 29B – fighter, 332 built 1953–1955; featured 50% larger fuel capacity and underwing hardpoints to carry bombs, rockets and drop-tanks.
    - A 29B – attacker, same aircraft as the J 29B, when serving with attack units; painted with olive green wingtips and fin from 1954 onward.
  - SK 29B – advanced trainer, 0 built (offered 1950); featured a two-seat cabin; duplicate ejection seats, gunsights and controls; no armament, armor, cabin lights or external lights; less fuel in the upper body tank.
    - SK 29B (side-by-side) – proposal with side-by-side seats
    - SK 29B (tandem) – proposal with tandem seats

Saab 29 C

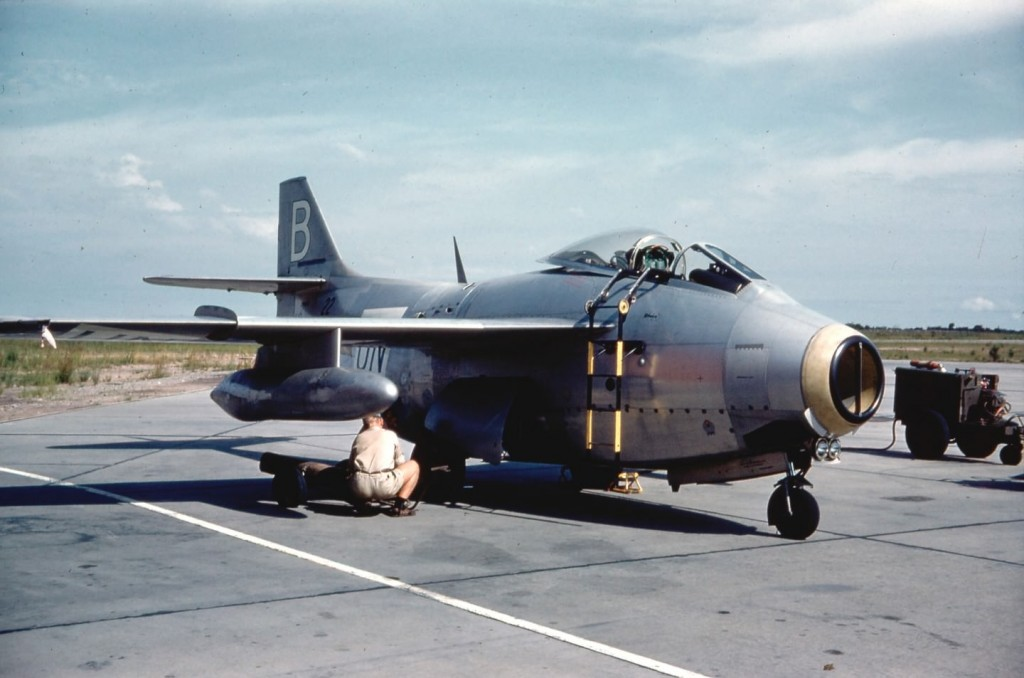
S 29C (late) with E-wing serving with the 22 U.N. Fighter Squadron in Kongo.

  - S 29C (early) – unarmed photo reconnaissance, 76 built from 1954 through 1956; based on the Saab 29B, with 5 cameras mounted in a modified nose (no armament was carried); painted with olive green wingtips and fin from 1954 onward.
  - S 29C (late) – S 29C modified with the improved wing design introduced on the Saab 29E, sometimes unofficially called S 29E.

Saab 29 D

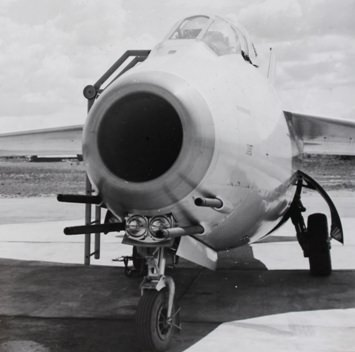
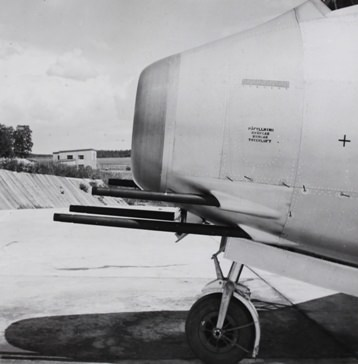
J 29A (s/n 29137) with 30 mm HSS 825 mockups, 1952.
  - J 29D – proposed fighter variant with afterburner; a single prototype was built to test the afterburning Ghost RM 2A turbojet with 27.5 kN (2,800 kgp/6,175 lbf) afterburning thrust. Prototype ultimately converted to J 29 F standard as the J 29F prototype.
    - J 29D (alt 1.) – proposal (alternative 1) fitted with a target acquisition radar in a nose radome either above the nose intake or placed inside it.
    - J 29D (alt 2.) – proposal (alternative 2) fitted the type with 4 × 30 mm Hispano HSS 825 guns. One J 29A (number 29137) trialed with 30 mm HSS 825 mockups in 1952. After trestle mount trials of the 30 mm HSS 825 in 1954 it was found that the weapon was unsafe and the idea to use it on the J 29D was scrapped.

Saab 29 E

  - J 29E – fighter, 29 built in 1955; introduced an improved wing design with a leading edge dogtooth extension to increase the critical Mach number.
    - A 29E – attacker, same aircraft as the J 29E, when serving with attack units; painted with olive green wingtips and fin.
  - S 29E – unofficial name for late S 29C modified with the improved E-wing design.

Saab 29 F

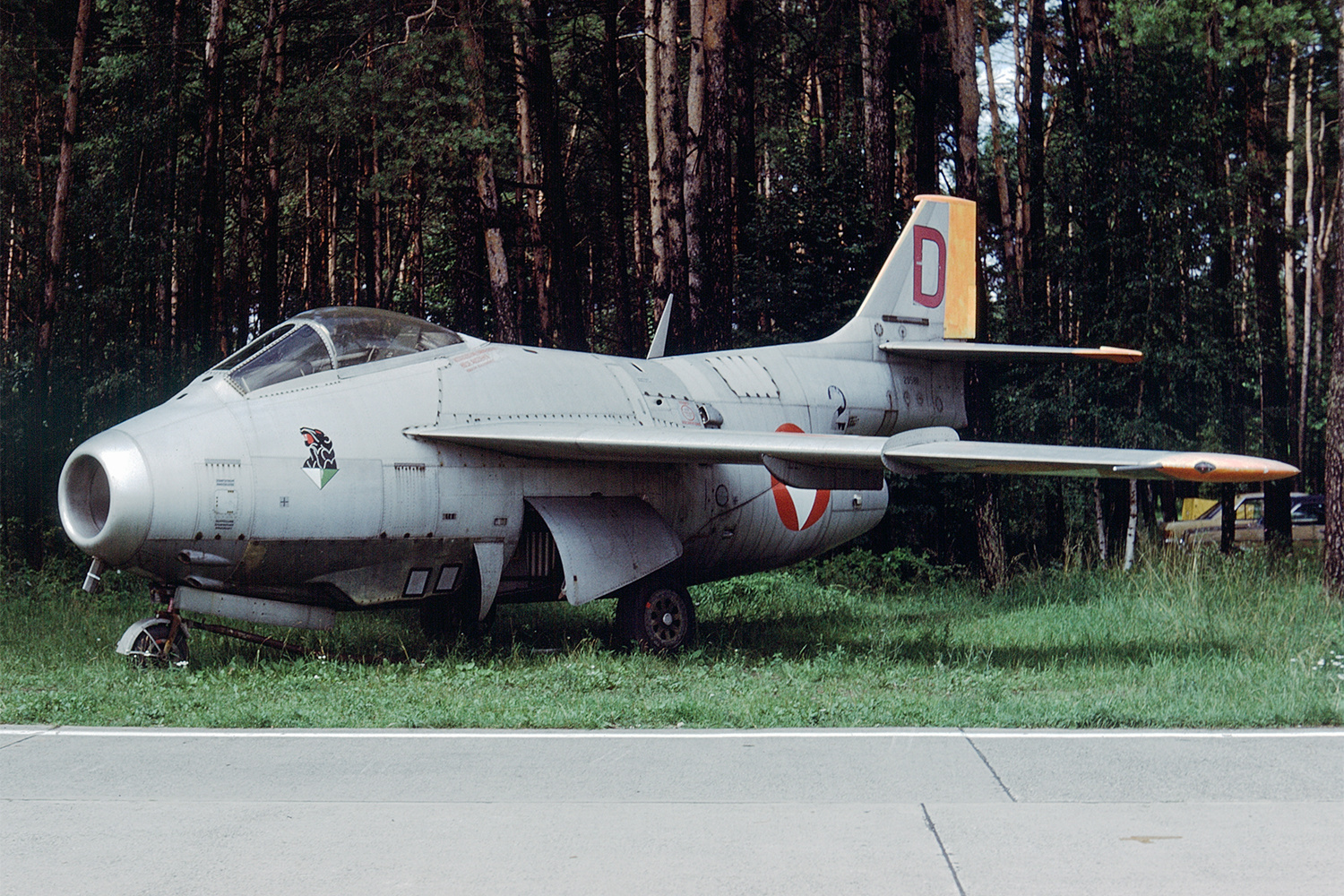
Austrian J-29F Aufklärungsversion (reconnaissance variant) with the two left guns replaced with a camera pack, 1979

  - J 29F – fighter, 308 aircraft converted from available stocks of B and E model airframes from 1954 to 1956; featured the afterburning Ghost and dogtooth wing; all remaining aircraft were further modified in 1963 to carry a pair of US-designed AIM-9B Sidewinder heat-seeking air-to-air missiles, in Swedish service designated as the rb 24.
    - A 29F – attacker, same aircraft as the J 29F, when serving with attack units; painted with olive green wingtips and fin.
  - J-29F „Tonne“ (Jagdversion, "pursuit version") – fighter, 20 unmodified J 29F used by the Austrian Air Force.
  - J-29F „Tonne“ (Aufklärungsversion, "reconnaissance version") – photo reconnaissance fighter, 10 modified J 29F used by the Austrian Air Force, fitting a camera pack by Swedish Malmö Flygindustri (MFI) in place of the two left cannons, housing three 70 mm Vinten cameras in a green housing; 12 packs bought by the Austrian Air Force (installation was reversible), with 10 aircraft constantly modified. Only used by the 2nd fighter-bomber squadron (2. Staffel/JaBo-Geschwader).

== Operators ==
Austria

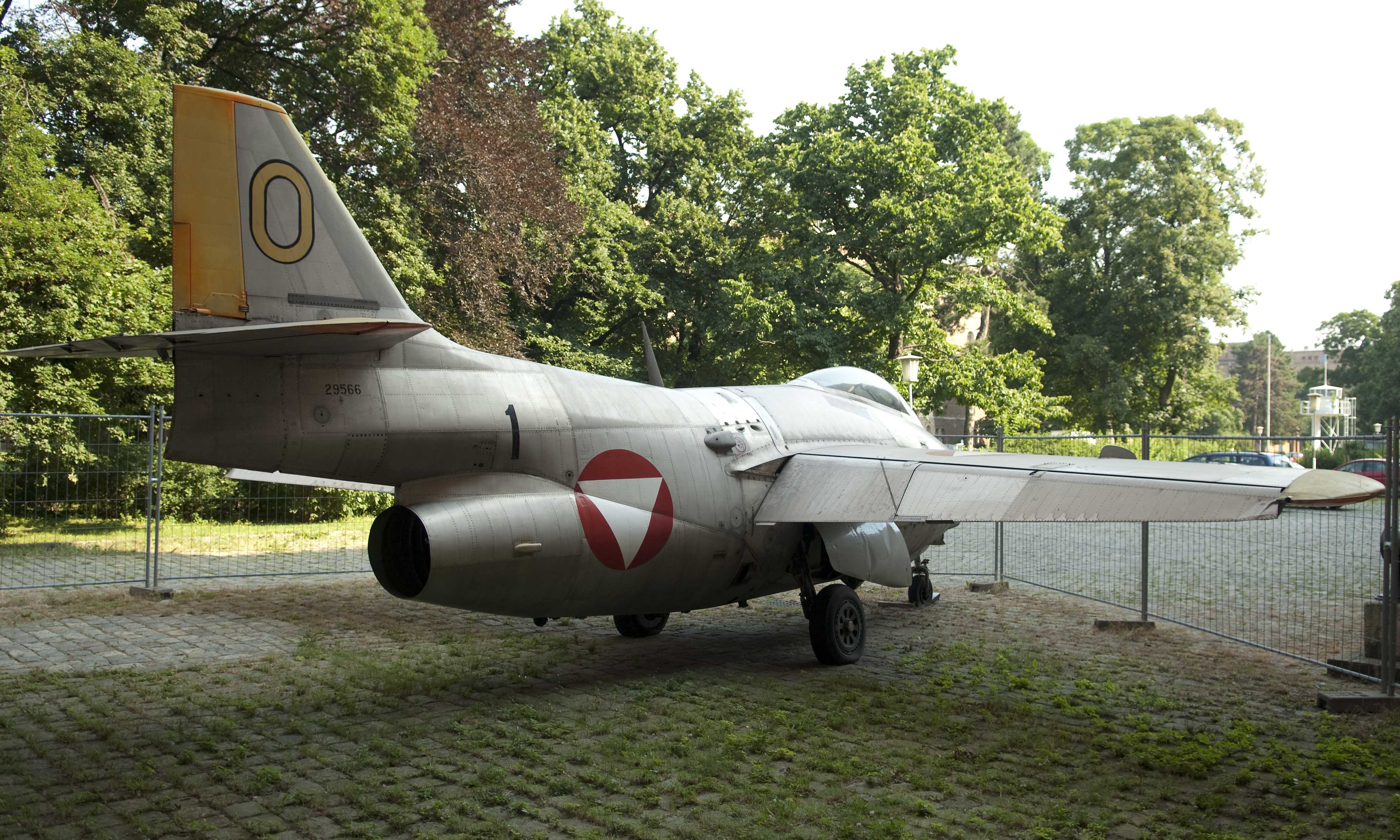
Austrian J 29F Tunnan from 1. Staffel/JaBo-Geschwader.

- Austrian Air Force
  - 1. Staffel/JaBo-Geschwader (1. Sta/Jabogeschw; "Jagdbombergeschwader"): A-O yellow tailcodes; 15 J-29F fighter bombers
  - 2. Staffel/JaBo-Geschwader (2. Sta/Jabogeschw; "Jagdbombergeschwader"): A-O red tailcodes; 5 J-29F fighter bombers, 10 J-29F reconnaissance fighters

Sweden

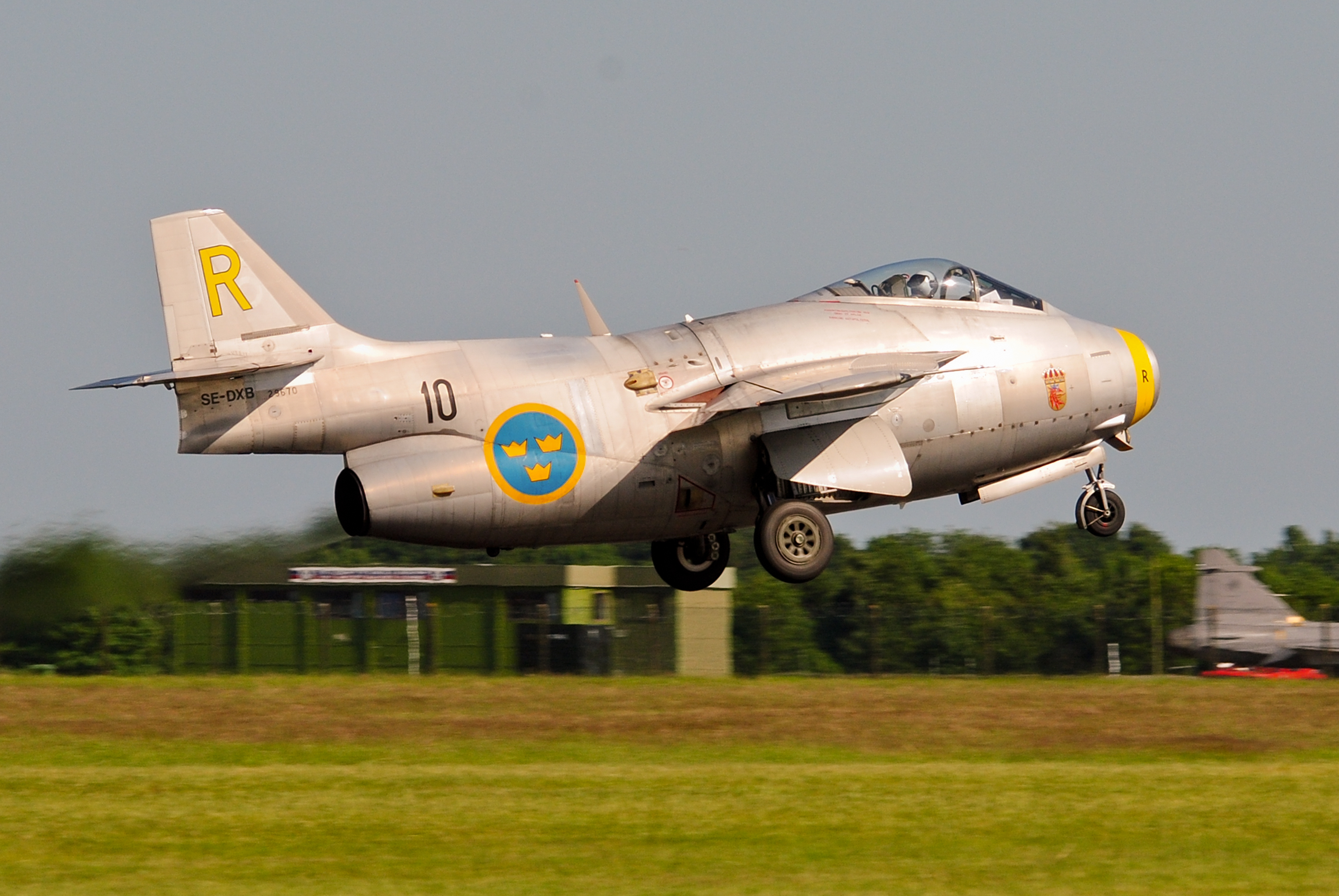
Saab J 29, Swedish Air Force Historic Flight, RAF Waddington Airshow 2013

- Swedish Air Force
  - F 3 Malmslätt
  - F 4 Frösön
  - F 6 Karlsborg
  - F 7 Såtenäs
  - F 8 Barkarby
  - F 9 Säve
  - F 10 Ängelholm
  - F 11 Nyköping
  - F 12 Kalmar
  - F 13 Norrköping
  - F 15 Söderhamn
  - F 16 Uppsala
  - F 21 Luleå

United Nations ONUC

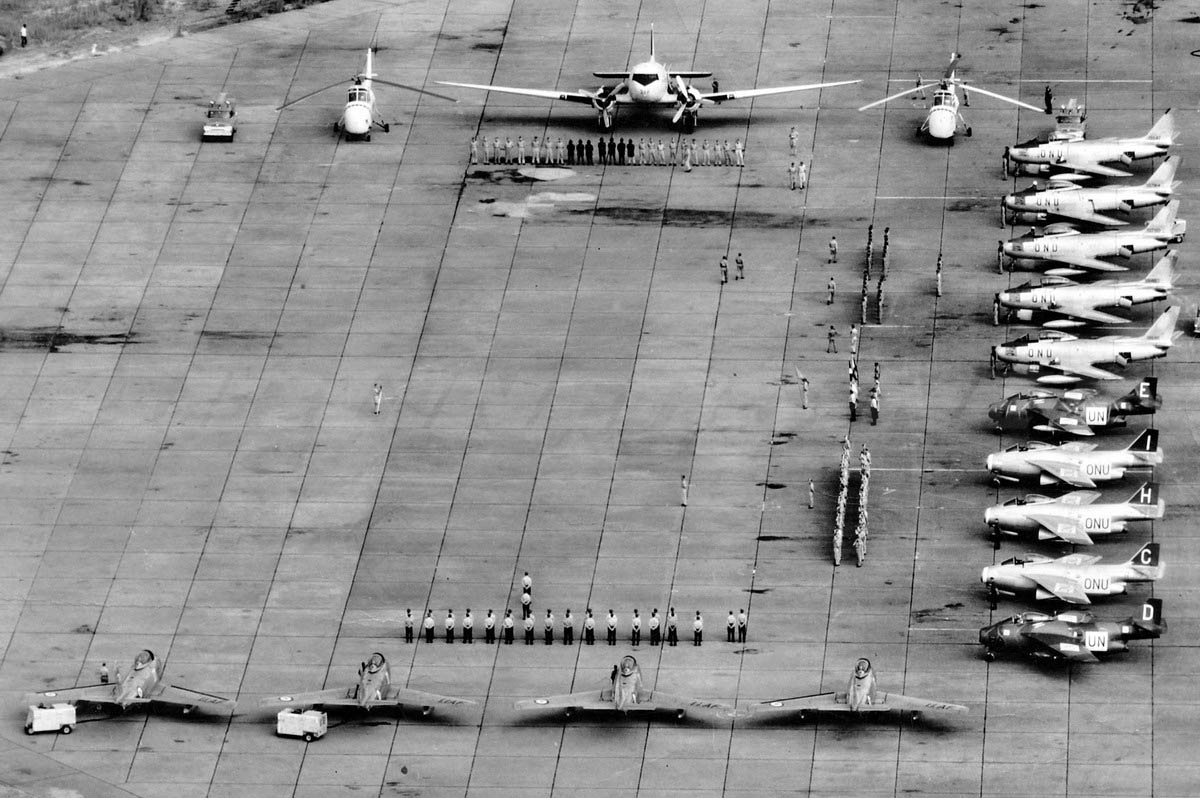
ONUC in Congo. Saab 29s along with Iranian and Philippine F-86 Sabres.

- UN Air Division
  - F 22 (UN Fighter Squadron 22)

== Surviving aircraft ==
- J 29F 29624 displayed at the Aeroseum in a cavern at Gothenburg/Säve airport.
- J 29F 29640 preserved at Midlands Air Museum, Coventry, UK.
- J 29F 29665 at the Musée de l'Air located at the former Paris–Le Bourget Airport in France.
- J 29F 29566 on display at the Museum of Military History in Vienna, Austria
- S 29C 29902 preserved at F11 Museum at Stockholm Skavsta Airport, Nyköping, Sweden.
- J 29B 29657 in outdoor storage at Pima Air and Space Museum, Tucson, Arizona, US.
- J 29F 29670 currently airworthy and flying in/around Sweden.
- S 29C 29937 displayed outdoor at Flygmuseeet F21 (F21 Luleå Air Museum) in Luleå, Norrbotten, Sweden.
- J 29F 29624 which served with F9 nicknamed "Gul Peter" (Yellow Peter), currently on display at the Aeroseum in Gothenborg, Västra Götalanad, Sweden.
- J 29 29543 on display at the Italian Air Force Museum in Vigna di Valle (Rome)

== Specifications (Saab J 29F Tunnan) ==
Saab J 29 Tunnan 3-view drawing

Data from The Great Book of Fighters, The Saab J 29 J 29F pilots manual

General characteristics

- Crew: 1
- Length: 10.23 m (33 ft 7 in)
- Wingspan: 11 m (36 ft 1 in)
- Height: 3.75 m (12 ft 4 in)
- Wing area: 24.15 m^{2} (259.9 sq ft)
- Empty weight: 4,845 kg (10,681 lb)
- Max takeoff weight: 8,375 kg (18,464 lb)
- Powerplant: 1 × Svenska Flygmotor RM2B centrifugal-flow turbojet engine with afterburning 6,200 lbf (27.58 kN) wet at 10,250 rpm; 4,750 lbf (21.1 kN) dry at 10,250 rpm.

Performance

- Maximum speed: 1,060 km/h (660 mph, 570 kn)
- Range: 1,100 km (680 mi, 590 nmi)
- Service ceiling: 15,500 m (50,900 ft)
- Rate of climb: 32.1 m/s (6,320 ft/min)

Armament

- Guns:

- 4 x 20 mm (0.79 in) akan m/47C (license produced Hispano Mark V) autocannon with 180 rounds per gun

- Hardpoints:

- 8 inner hardpoints for rocket/missile pylons; inner hardpoint only capable of carrying one smaller rocket due to the landing gear
- 2 outer hardpoints for drop tanks or incendiary bombs, however tests were conducted with carrying rockets on this hardpoint: 8 x 75 mm Bofors, 2-4 x 103 mm Bofors or 1 x 180 mm Bofors rocket could be carried per drop tank hardpoint via a dedicated pylon

- Rockets:

- 75 mm (3.0 in) srak m/55 (Bofors 75 mm (3.0 in) rocket "Frida") air-to-air rocket with contact fuze high-capacity warhead; 2-4 rockets per pylon up to a total of 24
- 80 mm (3.1 in) prak m/46C (RP-3 with sloped fins of Swedish design) air-to-ground rocket with 80 mm (3.1 in) armour-piercing warhead; 1 rocket per pylon up to a total of 8
- 145 mm (5.7 in) psrak m/49 (Bofors 103 mm (4.1 in) rocket) air-to-ground rocket with 145 mm (5.7 in) shaped charge warhead; 1-2 rockets per pylon up to a total of 14
- 150 mm (5.9 in) srak m/51 (Bofors 103 mm (4.1 in) rocket) air-to-ground rocket with 150 mm (6 in) high-explosive warhead; 1-2 rockets per pylon up to a total of 14
- 180 mm (7.1 in) hprak m/49 (Bofors 180 mm (7.1 in) rocket) air-to-ground rocket with semi armor-piercing, high-explosive warhead; 1 rocket per pylon up to a total of 4

- Missiles:

- Rb 24 (AIM-9B Sidewinder) air-to-air missile; carried on the third hardpoint from the center

- Bombs:

- 200 kg (441 lb) brandb m/51 incendiary bomb; carried in on the drop tank hardpoint
- 600 kg (1,323 lb) drop tanks could be armed as incendiary bombs in the air or filled with napalm from the start; carried in on the drop tank hardpoint

== See also ==
Aircraft of comparable role, configuration, and era

- Dassault Ouragan – (France)
- Dassault Mystère – (France)
- Hawker Hunter – (United Kingdom)
- Mikoyan-Gurevich MiG-15 – (Soviet Union)
- Mikoyan-Gurevich MiG-9 – (Soviet Union)
- Lavochkin La-15 – (Soviet Union)
- North American F-86 Sabre – (United States)
- FMA IAe 33 Pulqui II – (Argentina)
- Republic F-84F Thunderstreak – (United States)
- Focke-Wulf Ta 183 – (Nazi Germany)

Related lists

- List of fighter aircraft
- List of military aircraft of Sweden
