= De Havilland Vampire =

Fighter aircraft; first single-engine jet in RAF service

Vampire Sea Vampire
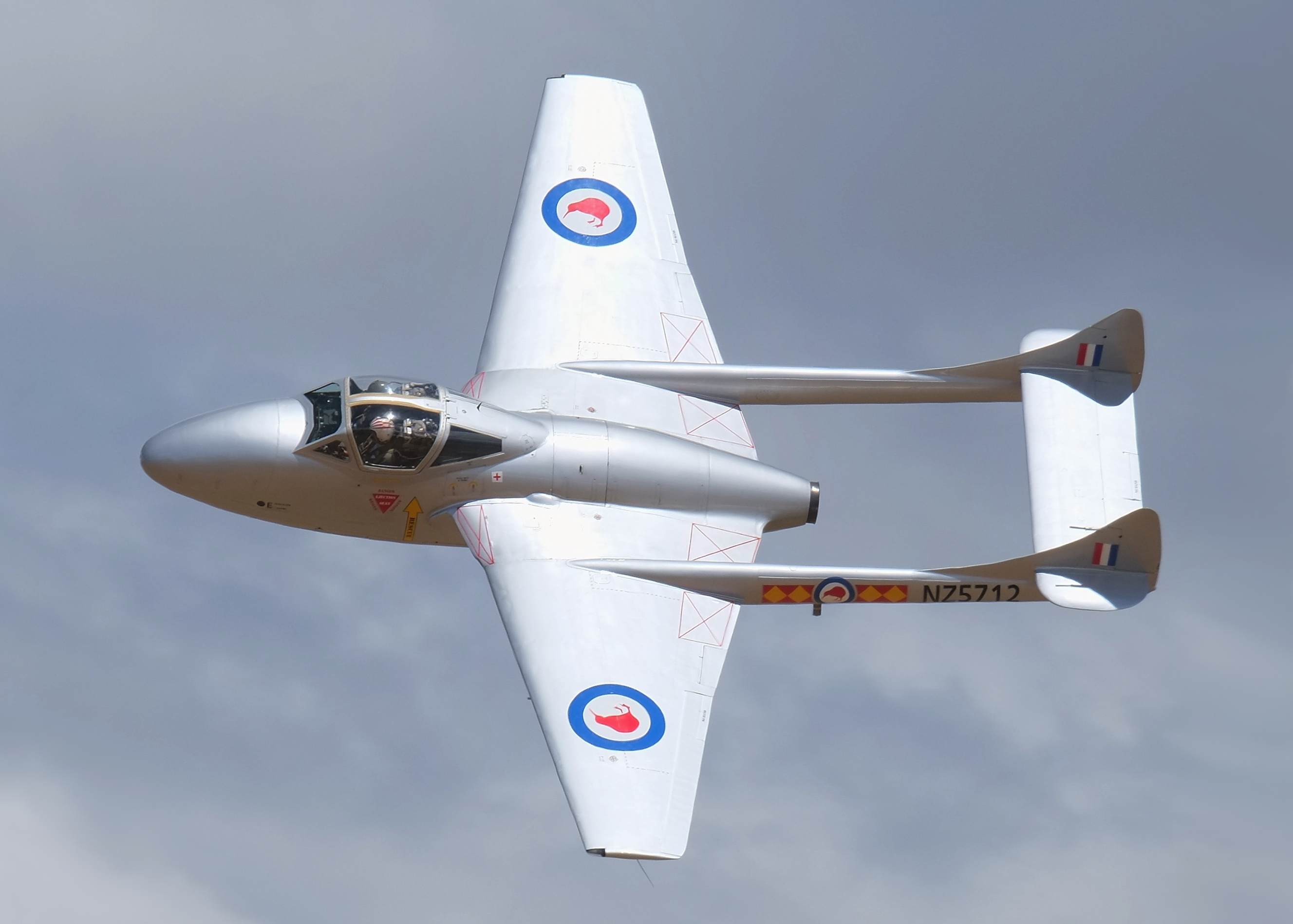
- Preserved de Havilland DH.115 Vampire trainer in Royal New Zealand Air Force markings

General information
- Type: Fighter aircraft
- National origin: United Kingdom
- Manufacturer: de Havilland; English Electric
- Primary users: Royal Air Force Royal Australian Air Force; Fleet Air Arm (RAN); Royal Navy; Royal Canadian Air Force
- Number built: 3,268 in Britain plus 1,512 abroad

History
- Introduction date: 1946
- First flight: 20 September 1943
- Retired: 1990 (Swiss Air Force)
- Developed into: de Havilland Venom

The de Havilland DH100 Vampire is a British jet fighter developed and manufactured by the de Havilland Aircraft Company. It was the second jet fighter to be operated by the Royal Air Force (RAF), after the Gloster Meteor, and the first to be powered by a single jet engine.

Development of the Vampire as an experimental aircraft began in 1941 during the Second World War, to exploit the revolutionary innovation of jet propulsion. From the company's design studies, de Havilland decided to use a single-engined, twin-boom aircraft, powered by the Halford H.1 turbojet (later produced as the Goblin). Aside from its propulsion system and twin-boom configuration, it was a relatively conventional aircraft. In May 1944, de Havilland decided to produce the aircraft as an interceptor for the RAF. In 1946, the Vampire entered operational service with the RAF, only months after the war had ended.

The Vampire quickly proved to be effective and was adopted as a replacement of wartime piston-engined fighter aircraft. During its early service, it accomplished several aviation firsts and achieved various records, such as being the first jet aircraft to cross the Atlantic Ocean. The Vampire remained in front-line RAF service until 1953, when its transfer began to secondary roles such as ground attack and pilot training, for which specialist variants were produced. The RAF retired the Vampire in 1966, when its final role of advanced trainer was filled by the Folland Gnat. The Royal Navy had also adapted the type as the Sea Vampire, a navy-adapted variant suitable for operations from aircraft carriers. It was the service's first jet fighter.

The Vampire was exported to many nations and was operated worldwide in numerous theatres and climates. Several countries used the type in combat including the Suez Crisis, the Malayan Emergency, and the Rhodesian Bush War. By the end of production, almost 3,300 Vampires had been manufactured, a quarter of these having been manufactured under licence abroad. De Havilland pursued the further development of the type; major derivatives produced include the DH.115, a specialised, dual-seat trainer and the more advanced DH.112 Venom, a refined variant for ground-attack and night-fighter operations.

== Development ==
=== Origins ===
In January 1941, Sir Henry Tizard made an informal approach to the de Havilland Aircraft Company, suggesting that the company proceed to design a fighter aircraft that would use the revolutionary new jet propulsion technology then under development, along with an appropriate engine to go with it. Although no official specification had been issued, de Havilland proceeded to design a single-engined aircraft that had air intakes set into the wing roots to feed a centrally mounted engine, which used a centrifugal compressor.

Aero-engine designer Major Frank Halford had been given access to Frank Whittle's pioneering work on gas turbines; for the projected jet-powered fighter, Halford decided to proceed with the design of a "straight through" centrifugal engine capable of generating 3,000 lb of thrust, which was considered to be high at the time. Halford's engine emerged as the Halford H.1. By April 1941, design work on the engine had been completed and a prototype H.1 engine performed its first test run one year later.

The low power output of the early jet engines had meant that only twin-engined aircraft designs were considered to be practical, and as more powerful jet engines were quickly developed, particularly Halford's H.1 (later known as the de Havilland Goblin), the practicalities of the single-engined jet fighter were soon realised. de Havilland was approached to produce an airframe for the H.1 as insurance against Germany using jet bombers against Britain; this was considered more important than de Havilland's suggestion of a high-speed jet bomber. Its first design, the DH.99, was set out in a brochure dated 6 June 1941; it was an all-metal, twin-boom, tricycle undercarriage aircraft armed with four cannon. The use of a twin boom enabled the jet pipe to be kept relatively short, which avoided the power loss that would have occurred if a long pipe were used, as would have been necessary in a conventional fuselage. It also put the tailplane clear of interference from the exhaust. Performance was estimated at 455 mph (732 km/h) at sea level and initial climb of 4,590 ft/min (1,400 m/min) on 2,700 lb of thrust. The Ministry of Aircraft Production (MAP) representative expressed doubts regarding the lack of detail, estimations for the aircraft's performance and optimistic structure weight; the project received permission to proceed in July 1941.

The DH.99 design was soon modified to incorporate a combined wood-and-metal construction in light of recommendations from the MAP; the design was thus renumbered to DH.100 by November 1941. The aircraft was considered to be a largely experimental design due to its use of a single engine and some unorthodox features, unlike the Gloster Meteor, which had been specified for production early on. In February 1942, the MAP suggested dropping the project for a bomber, but de Havilland stated that the twin-boom was, despite ministry doubts, only an engineering problem to be overcome. On 22 April 1942, the construction of two prototypes (serials LZ548 and LZ551) was authorised by the ministry, whilst Specification E.6/41 was produced and issued to cover the work. The company proceeded with the detailed design work phase of the DH.100 in early 1942.

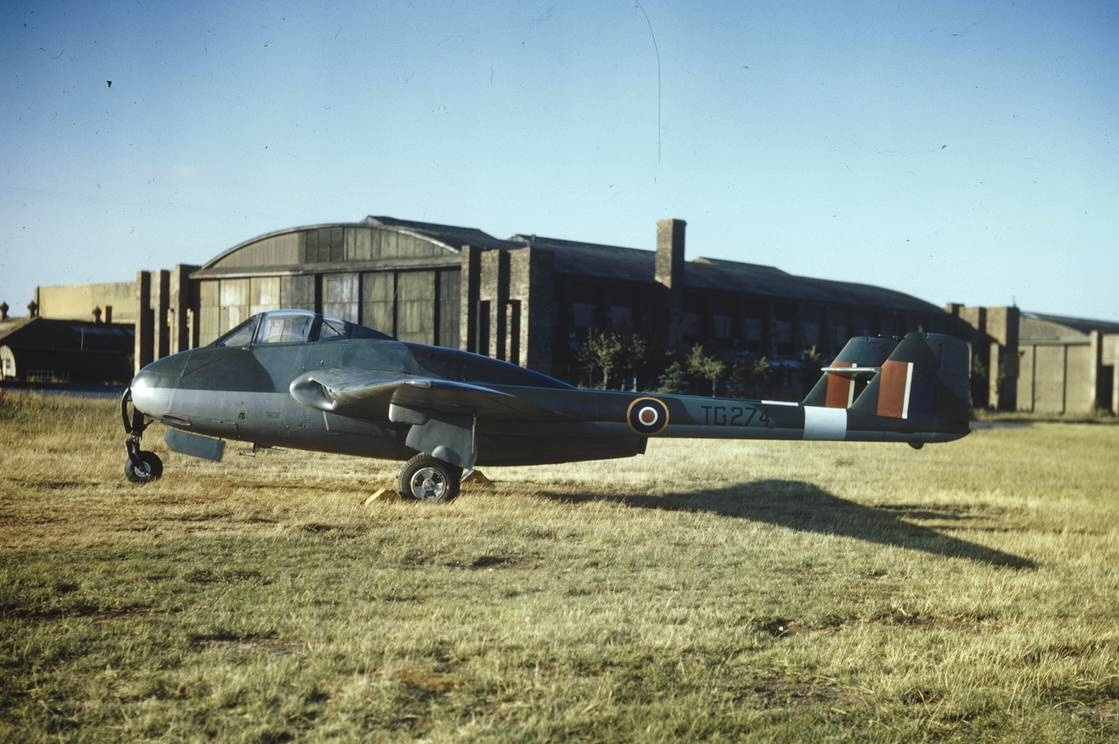
The first Vampire F.1, in 1945 at the Aeroplane and Armament Experimental Establishment

Internally designated as the DH.100 and originally codenamed Spider Crab, the aircraft was entirely a de Havilland project, being principally worked upon at the company's facility at Hatfield, Hertfordshire. The construction of the aircraft exploited de Havilland's extensive experience in the use of moulded plywood for aircraft construction, which had previously been used on the Mosquito, a widely produced fast bomber of the war.

The layout of the DH.100 used a single jet engine installed in an egg-shaped fuselage that was primarily composed of plywood for the forward section and aluminium throughout the aft section. It was furnished with conventional, mid-mounted, straight wings; air brakes were installed on the wings to slow the aircraft, a feature that had also been incorporated in the Meteor. Armament comprised four 20 mm Hispano Mk V cannon underneath the nose; from the onset of the design phase, even when the aircraft was officially intended to serve only as an experimental aircraft, the provision for the cannon armament had been included.

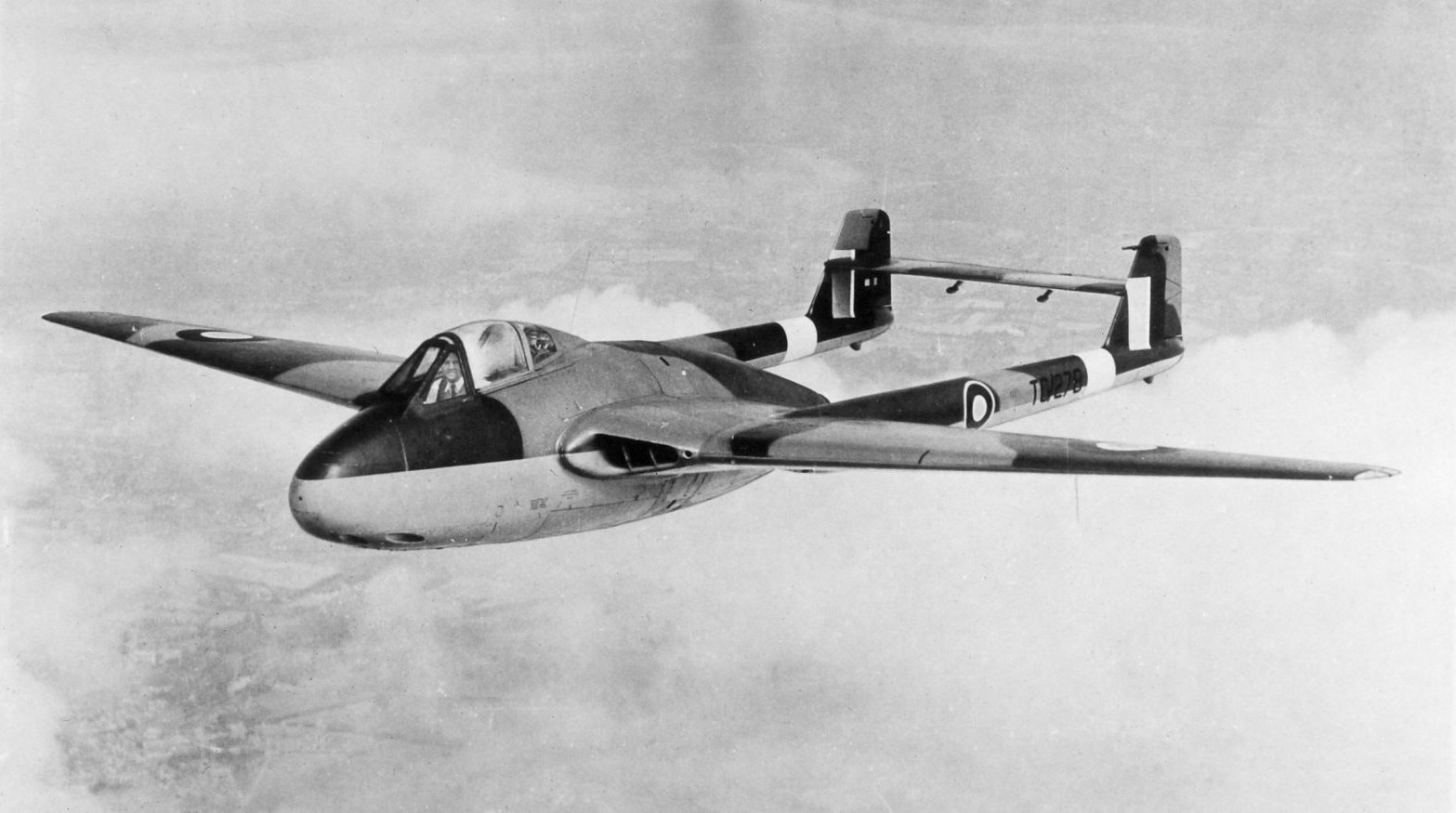
Vampire F.1 TG/278L The square fins and high horizontal stabilizer were changed for later production aircraft.

On 20 September 1943, the first DH.100 prototype, serial number LZ548/G (Note: The 'G' suffix after the serial number indicated that the aircraft should have a guard at all times to maintain secrecy.), conducted its maiden flight from Hatfield Aerodrome; it was piloted by Geoffrey de Havilland Jr., the company's chief test pilot and son of the company's founder. This flight took place only six months after the Meteor had performed its own maiden flight; the first flight had been delayed due to the need to dispatch the only available engine suitable for flight to America to replace one destroyed in ground engine runs in Lockheed's prototype XP-80 jet fighter. Three prototypes, LZ548/G, LZ551/G, and MP838/G, were produced to support the type's development. Testing showed the main problem was with directional instability – the aircraft "snaking" – this was corrected by changes to the tail design.

=== Production and further development ===
On 13 May 1944, an initial production order for 120 Vampire Mk I aircraft was received and quickly increased to 300 aircraft. The first production Vampire, Mk F.1 TG274, did not fly until 20 April 1945, at Samlesbury. Owing to the wartime pressures upon de Havilland's production facilities for existing aircraft types, English Electric Aircraft undertook production of the Vampire at their factories at Preston in Lancashire, instead; the company went on to produce the majority of the aircraft. Only about half a dozen production aircraft had been built by the end of the Second World War, although it did not result in the type becoming a victim of the extensive postwar cuts that were soon implemented, which had terminated the production of many aircraft along with development work upon several more. Eventually, however, 244 production Mk 1 Vampire aircraft were built.

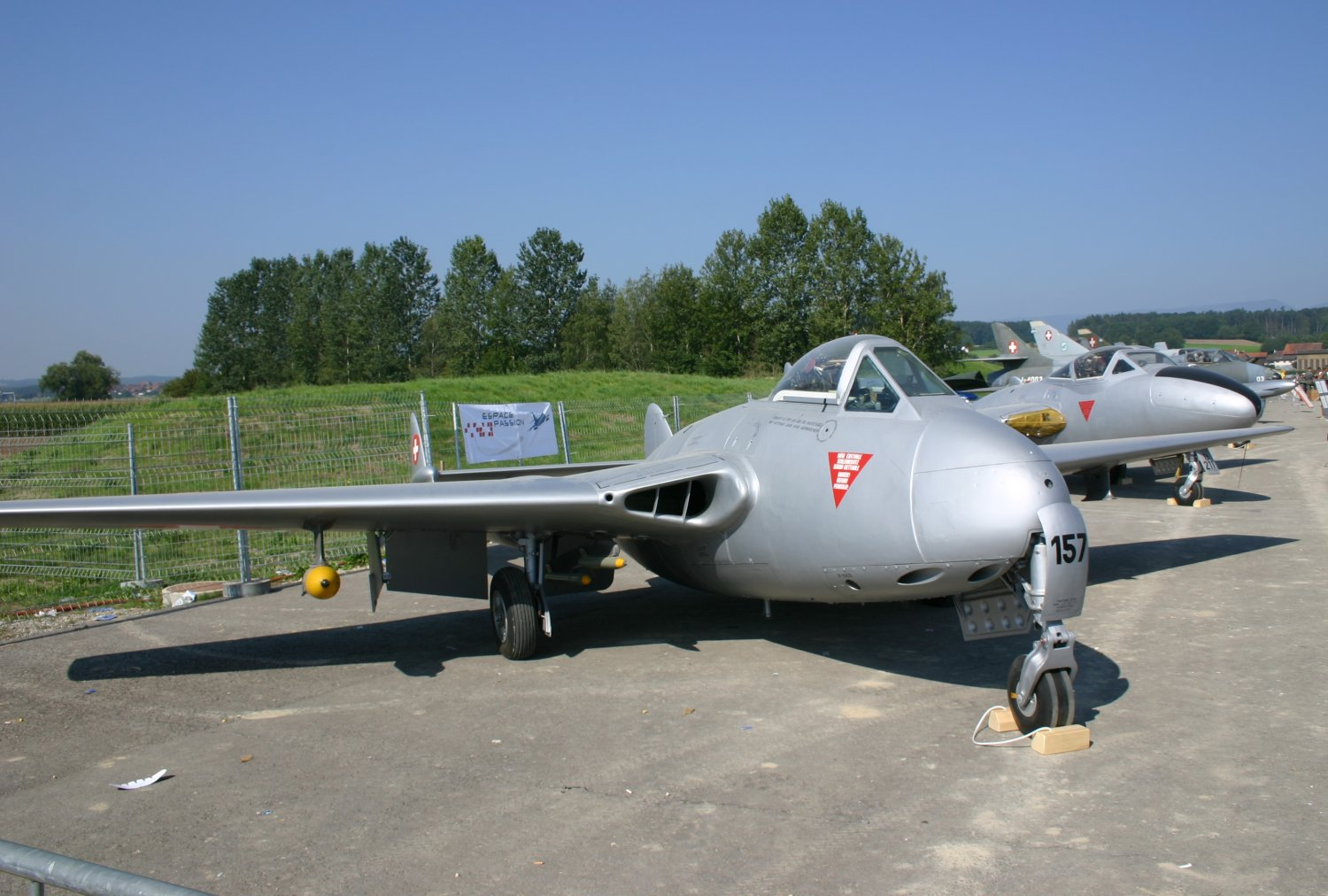
Comparison of the FB.5 single-seat (left) and T.11 dual-seat Vampire

De Havilland initiated a private venture night fighter, the DH.113, intended for export, fitting a two-seat cockpit closely based on that of the Mosquito night fighter and a lengthened nose that accommodated an AI Mk X radar. An order to supply the Egyptian Air Force was received, but this was blocked by the British government as part of an embargo on supplying arms to Egypt. The RAF took over the order and put them into service as an interim measure between the retirement of the de Havilland Mosquito night fighter and the full introduction of the Meteor night fighter. Removal of the radar from the night fighter and fitting of dual controls resulted in a jet trainer model of the aircraft, the DH.115 Vampire, which entered British service as the Vampire T.11. This trainer variant was built in large numbers for the RAF and for export.

An alternative powerplant to the de Havilland Goblin soon became available in the form of the Rolls-Royce Nene, another turbojet engine capable of generating similar levels of thrust. The name Vampire II was given to three experimental Nene-powered Vampires, which were used to assess their performance. One of these was evaluated by the RAF before the rival Goblin was selected for the RAF Vampires, instead; another contributed to development work for the Vampires for the Royal Australian Air Force (RAAF).

Although the Nene had a higher thrust than the Goblin, its level flight speed was no greater. To reduce the intake losses caused by having to feed air to the rear face of the impeller of the Nene, two additional intakes were added behind the cockpit; these caused elevator reversal and buffeting, which in turn reduced the Vampire's Mach limit. The Vampires of the RAAF were powered by the Nene engine; these were initially outfitted with dorsal intakes, later moved underneath the fuselage. In 1949, Boulton Paul Aircraft redesigned the wing-root intakes and internal ducting based on the installation of the Nene in the prototype Hawker Sea Hawk. The Mistral, the French name for their models of the Vampire, also used the Nene engine with Boulton Paul intakes.

The Vampire III was the first of several models that sought to address the demands for greater range from the type. Underwing fuel drop tanks of 100- and 200-gallon capacities were fitted; other modifications included lowering the tailplane and reshaping the vertical surfaces of the tail. The design changes to accommodate the hardpoint-mounted drop tanks had the benefit of enabling the carriage of various stores and readied the type for ground-attack operations. The wing was considerably modified to improve low-altitude performance, the span was reduced by 2 ft with the adoption of square-cut wing tips, and the wing skins were thickened and the undercarriage modified to withstand the increased weight. In total, 3,268 Vampires were built in 15 versions, including two-seat night fighters, 804 trainers, and carrier-based Sea Vampires. The Vampire was used by 31 air forces. Germany, the Netherlands, Spain, and the U.S. were the only major Western powers not to use the aircraft.

=== Records and achievements ===
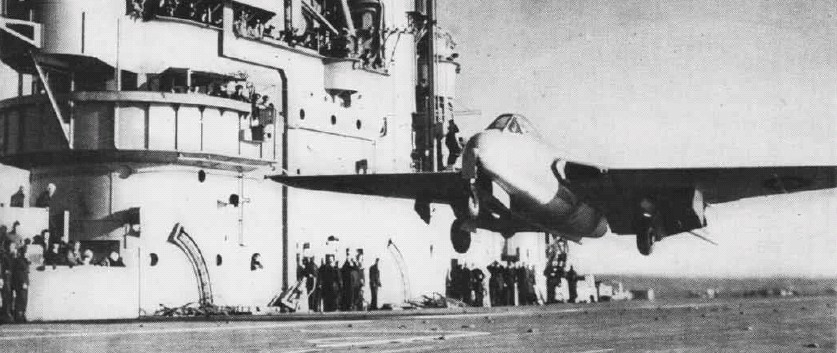
The first carrier landing and takeoff of a jet aircraft in 1945 – Eric "Winkle" Brown taking off from HMS Ocean

On 8 June 1946, the Vampire was introduced to the British public when Fighter Command's 247 Squadron was given the honour of leading the flypast over London at the Victory Day Celebrations. The Vampire was a versatile aircraft, setting many aviation firsts and records, being the first RAF fighter with a top speed in excess of 500 mph (800 km/h). On 3 December 1945, a Sea Vampire piloted by Captain Eric "Winkle" Brown became the first pure-jet aircraft to land on and take off from an aircraft carrier. (Note: On 6 November 1945, a Ryan FR Fireball, a mixed-power fighter with a piston engine used during takeoff and landing to compensate for the slow response of its jet engine, had a piston-engine failure on final approach. The pilot started the jet engine, and at high approach speed (ending up in the crash barrier) performing the first jet-powered carrier landing, albeit unintentionally, although the Fireball was not a high-performance jet fighter like the Vampire.)

Vampires and Sea Vampires were used in trials from 1947 to 1955 to develop recovery and deck-handling procedures and equipment for the operation of aircraft without an undercarriage from flexible rubber decks on aircraft carriers. Deletion of the undercarriage would reduce the aircraft weight and allow extra fuel to be carried. Despite demonstrating that the technique was feasible, with many landings being made with undercarriage retracted on flexible decks both at RAE Farnborough and on board the carrier HMS Warrior, the proposal was not taken further. Aviation author Geoffrey Cooper quotes author Marriott stating that the rubber deck system "...would have required extensive facilities both aboard ship and at naval air stations to support it. Any gains in aircraft performance were more than cancelled by the complexity and cost of implementation."

On 23 March 1948, John Cunningham, flying a modified Vampire Mk I with extended wing tips and powered by the Ghost engine, achieved a new world altitude record of 59,446 ft (18,119 m).

On 14 July 1948, six Vampire F.3s of No. 54 Squadron RAF became the first jet aircraft to fly across the Atlantic Ocean when they arrived in Goose Bay, Labrador. They went via Stornoway in the Outer Hebrides of Scotland, Keflavík in Iceland and Bluie West 1, Greenland. From Goose Bay airfield they went on to Montreal (about 3,000 mi/4,830 km) to start the RAF's annual goodwill tour of Canada and the US, where they gave formation aerobatic displays. At the same time, USAF Colonel David C. Schilling led a group of F-80 Shooting Stars flying to Fürstenfeldbruck Air Base in Germany to relieve a unit based there. There were conflicting reports later regarding competition between the RAF and USAF to be the first to fly the Atlantic. One report said the USAF squadron delayed completion of its movement to allow the Vampires to be "the first jets across the Atlantic". Another said that the Vampire pilots celebrated "winning the race against the rival F-80s."

== Design ==
=== Overview ===
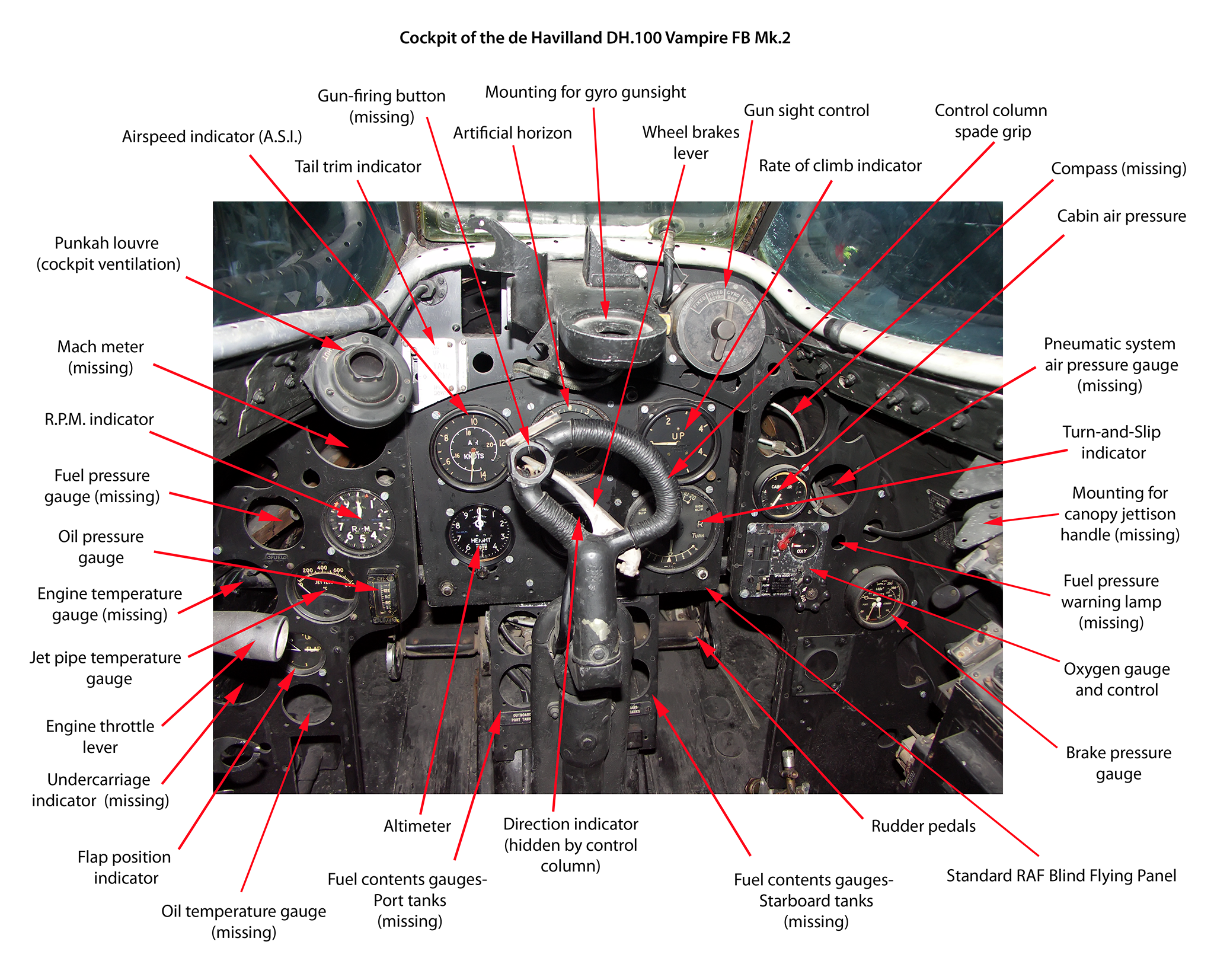
Cockpit layout of the Vampire FB Mk2

The de Havilland Vampire was a jet-powered, twin-boom aircraft, typically employed in the fighter and fighter-bomber roles. Aviation author Francis K. Mason referred to it as being "the last unsophisticated single-engined, front-line aircraft to serve with Britain's Fighter Command"; the Vampire was a relatively straightforward aircraft, employing only manually operated flight controls, no radar, a simple airframe, and aside from the propulsion system, made use of mostly conventional practices and technologies. The distinctive twin-boom tail configuration of the Vampire was one of the only nontraditional airframe features when compared to its contemporaries.

In comparison to later aircraft, the Vampire had a relatively disorganised cockpit that in some aspects lacked ergonomic measures, such as the fuel gauges being difficult for the pilot to observe without pulling back the control column. A few controls, such as the low-pressure fuel cock, were known for being difficult to move or were otherwise obstructed by other controls. The pilot was provided with a fairly favourable external view, in part aided by the relatively small size of the Vampire.

=== Engine ===
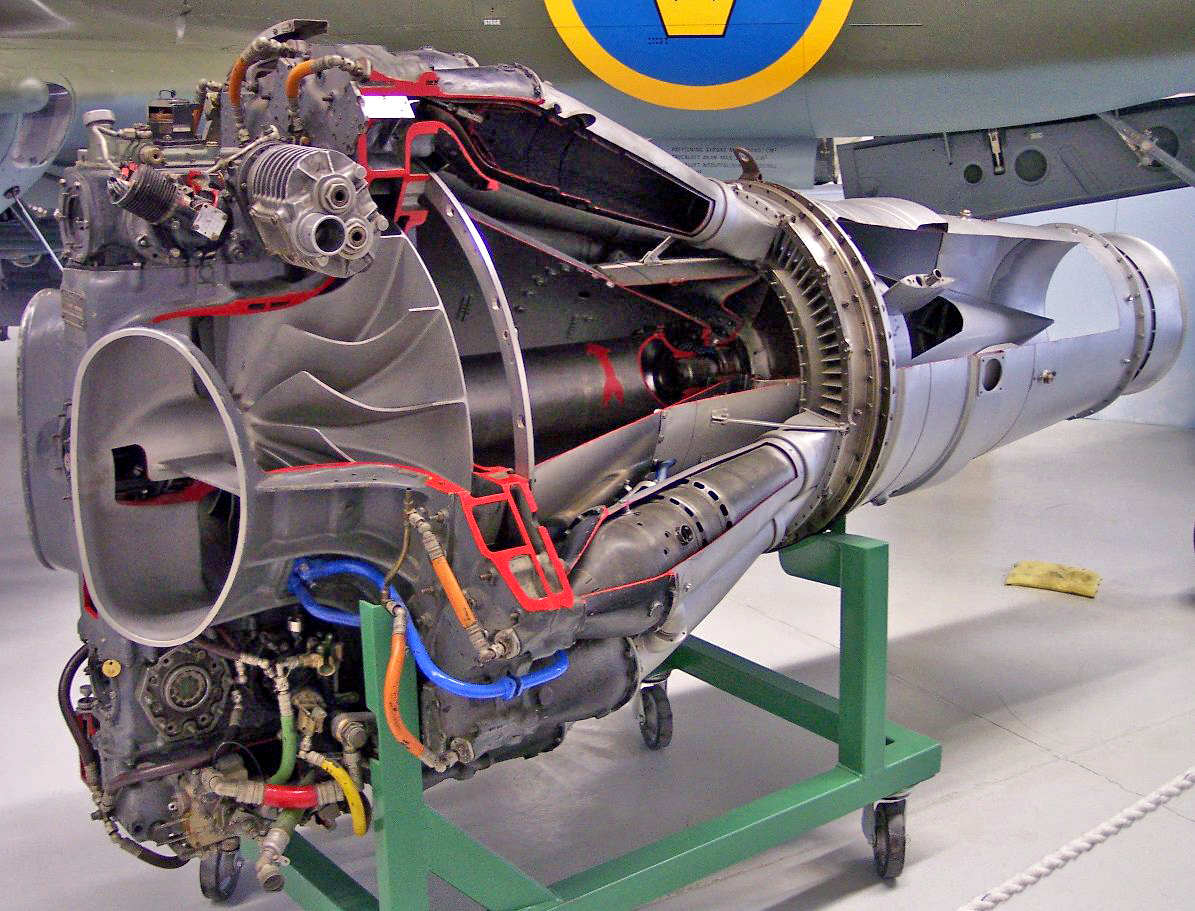
The de Havilland Goblin II internals displayed in cutaway section

The Vampire was first powered by a single Halford H1 (produced as the de Havilland Goblin) turbojet engine, initially capable of producing 2,100 lbf (9.3 kN) of thrust, designed by Frank Halford and manufactured by de Havilland Engine Company. (Note: Note: the Halford H.1 had been designed by Frank Halford's consulting company, then a separate organisation from de Havilland) This engine was a centrifugal-flow type, a configuration superseded after 1949 by the slimmer axial-flow units. In 1947, Wing Commander Maurice Smith, assistant editor of Flight magazine, stated upon piloting his first jet-powered aircraft, a Vampire Mk III: "Piloting a jet aircraft has confirmed one opinion I had formed after flying as a passenger in the Lancastrian jet test beds, that few, if any, having flown in a jet-propelled transport, will wish to revert to the noise, vibration, and attendant fatigue of an airscrew-propelled, piston-engined aircraft".

Initially, the relatively high fuel consumption of the Goblin engine had limited the range of early models of the Vampire; this had been a common problem with all early jet aircraft. As a result, later marks featured considerably increased internal fuel capacity. The H.1 Goblin engine, conceived in 1941, remained unchanged in basic form for 13 years; Flight said, "The Goblin ... can fairly claim to be the world's most reliable turbojet". Over successive models, it gained increased turbine temperature and thrust. Later-built Vampire Mk Is were powered by the Goblin II; the F.3 onwards used the improved Goblin III; by the mid-1950s, the Goblin Mk. 35 export engine, capable of 3,500 lbf, had become available, as well.

Certain marks of the Vampire were also operated as flying testbeds for the Rolls-Royce Nene engine, leading to the FB30 and 31 variants that were built in, and operated by, Australia. Due to the low positioning of the engine, a Vampire could not remain on idle for long, as the heat from the jet exhaust would melt the tarmac behind the aircraft. If the engine did stall in flight, no means existed to relight the engine, meaning that a forced landing would be necessary.

=== Handling ===
According to Mason, the controls of the Vampire were considered to be relatively light and sensitive, employing an effective elevator arrangement that enabled generous acceleration from relatively little control inputs along with highly balanced ailerons that could achieve high rates of roll. In comparison to the elevator and ailerons, the rudder required more vigorous actuation to achieve meaningful effect. Pilots converting from piston-engined types would find themselves having to adapt to the slower acceleration of turbojet engines and the corresponding need to moderate rapid throttle movements to avoid instigating a compressor stall.

The Vampire had a relatively good power/weight ratio and was reputedly quite manoeuvrable within the 400–500 mph (640–800 km/h) range. Heavy use of the rudder was required at slower speeds, during which pilots had to be cautious during shallow turns to avoid stalls; this would be typically embarrassing rather than dangerous due to the relative ease of recovery, which was principally achieved via positive elevator application. At speeds exceeding Mach 0.71, increasing levels of buffeting were encountered.

The Vampire was compatible with a wide range of aerobatic manoeuvres, Mason comparing its capabilities in this respect to purpose-built sporting aircraft. The type was claimed to have been the last British jet-powered fighter capable of accurately precipitating conditions such as hammer stalls, stall turns, and wingovers.

Preparing the Vampire for take-off required pilots to perform only six "vital actions" - setting the trim to neutral, opening the high- and low-pressure fuel cocks, activating the booster pump, setting the flaps, and retracting the air brakes. If laden with external fuel tanks or bombs, pilots would have to retract the undercarriage quite quickly upon leaving the ground, else increasing airflow as the aircraft picked up speed would prevent the undercarriage doors from closing. Landing procedure was similarly free of complexity - disengaging the wheel brakes, lowering the undercarriage, setting the flaps to fully down, and activating the air brakes. Typically, power-on landings were conducted due to the slow response of the engine to throttle changes, and wheel brakes had to be applied carefully to avoid locking the wheels because no anti-lock braking system was used on the fighters. Training variants had the Dunlop Maxaret anti-skid system fitted.

== Operational history ==
=== United Kingdom ===
Royal Air Force

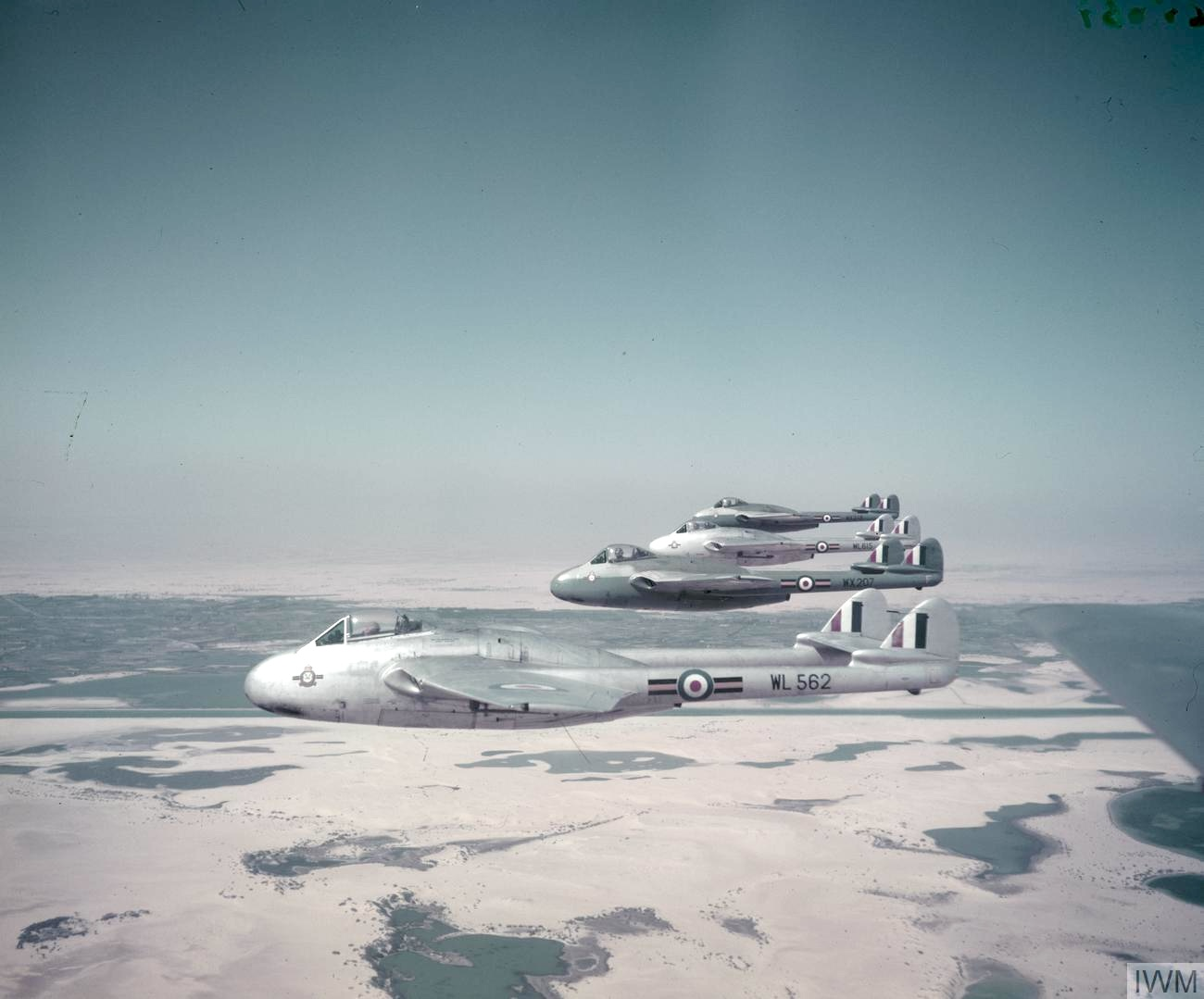
A formation of Vampire FB9s belonging to No. 213 Squadron flying over Egypt, 1952

In 1946, the first Vampire Mk I fighters entered RAF service in the interceptor role. (Note: Watkins: "The Vampire had been conceived during the war as a high-altitude fighter ...") Soon thereafter, considerable numbers of Mk I aircraft began equipping RAF squadrons of the Second Tactical Air Force stationed in Germany, often to replace wartime fighters such as the Hawker Typhoon, Hawker Tempest, and North American Mustang. On 3 July 1948, the Vampire became the first jet aircraft to equip peacetime units of the Royal Auxiliary Air Force, gradually replacing the de Havilland Mosquito in this capacity.

On 23 June 1948, the first production Vampire Fighter-Bomber Mk 5 (otherwise commonly designated as the FB.5), which had been modified from a Vampire F.3, carried out its maiden flight. The FB.5 retained the Goblin III engine of the F.3, but featured armour protection around engine systems, wings clipped back by 1 ft (30 cm), and longer-stroke main landing gear to handle greater takeoff weights and provide clearance for stores/weapons load. An external tank or 500 lb (227 kg) bomb could be carried under each wing, and eight "3-inch" rocket projectiles ("RPs") could be stacked in pairs on four attachments inboard of the booms. Although the adoption of an ejection seat was being considered at one stage, it was ultimately not fitted.

At its peak, a total of 19 RAF squadrons flew the Vampire FB.5 in Europe, the Middle East, and the Far East. By far, the theatre in which the largest number of Vampires were stationed was Germany; this extensive deployment by the RAF has been viewed as one measure of the emerging Cold War climate between Western and Eastern Europe, as well as being a reaction to events such as the Korean War and the Berlin Blockade. Vampires were also operated by a number of active and reserve squadrons stationed in the UK.

A number of RAF Vampires were used in active combat within the Far East during the Malayan Emergency, fought in the late 1940s and early 1950s. Specifically, the Vampire FB.5 typically undertook attack missions using a combination of rockets and bombs against insurgent targets often located in remote jungle areas throughout in Malaysia. The Vampire FB.5 became the most numerous single-seat variant of the type, 473 aircraft having been produced.

Experience of Vampire operation in tropical climates led to the development of new models featuring refrigeration equipment for pilot comfort and increasingly powerful models of the Goblin engine, to counter the degradation of performance in hot conditions. The RAF decided to adopt a new model of the Vampire featuring the Goblin 3 engine. Accordingly, in January 1952, the first Vampire FB.9s were introduced to service and first used by the Far East Air Force, soon replacing its older FB.5 aircraft. The FB.9 was deployed to various parts of the Middle East and Africa, including a brief 1954 deployment against Mau Mau insurgents in Kenya. It was gradually replaced by the de Havilland Venom, a swept wing development of the Vampire.

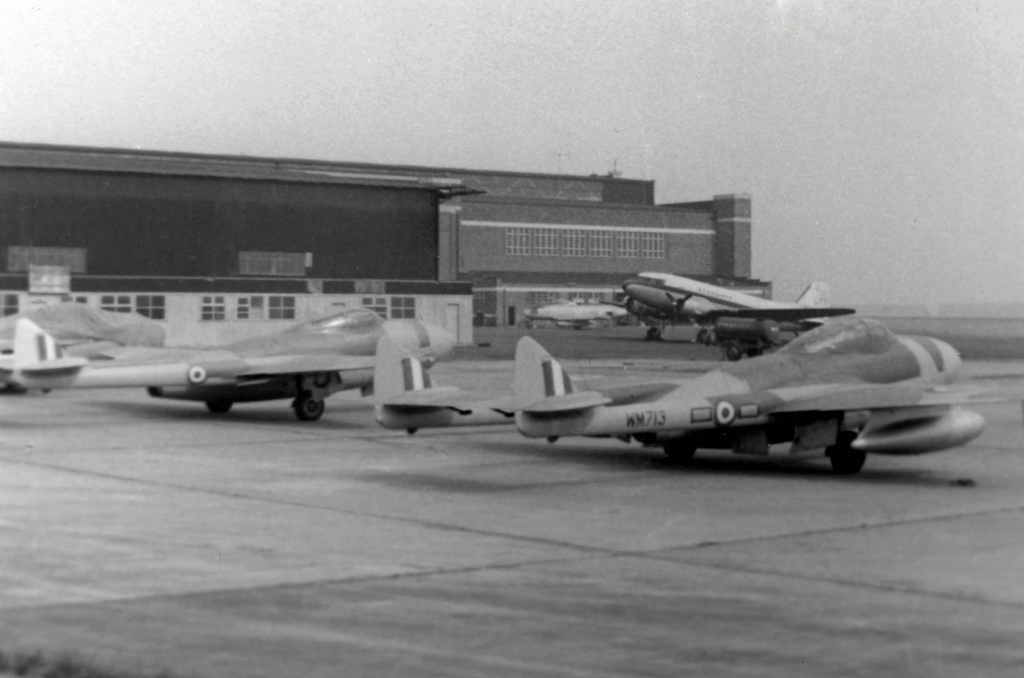
An RAF Vampire NF.10 of No. 25 Squadron, circa 1954

The Vampire NF.10 served from 1951 to 1954 with three squadrons (23, 25, and 151) but was often flown in daytime as well as night. After its replacement by the de Havilland Venom, these aircraft underwent conversion to the NF(T).10 standard, after which they were operated by the Central Navigation and Control School at RAF Shawbury. Other aircraft were sold on to the Indian Air Force for further use.

By 1953, the Vampire FB.5 was being increasingly considered to be obsolete, having not kept up with the advancements made on the Meteor 8. The RAF eventually relegated the single-seat Vampire to advanced training roles in the mid-1950s, and the type had been generally phased out of RAF service by the end of the decade.

The final variants of the Vampire was the T (trainer) aircraft. Being first flown from the old Airspeed Ltd factory at Christchurch, Hampshire, on 15 November 1950, production deliveries of the Vampire trainer began in January 1952. Over 600 examples of the T.11 were produced at Hatfield and Chester and by Fairey Aviation at Manchester Airport. By 1965, the Vampire trainer had been mostly withdrawn, its replacement in the advanced training role being the Folland Gnat; only a small number of Vampire T.11s remained in service, typically for the training of foreign students until these, too, were retired in 1967.

A small number of aircraft that were used in secondary roles carried on in these capacities until the withdrawal of the last operational aircraft from service with No. 3 Civilian Anti-Aircraft Co-operation Unit at Exeter at the end of 1971. A single aircraft continued to be flown and remained in official service with the RAF as part of the "Vintage Pair" display team (along with a Gloster Meteor); however, this aircraft was lost as a result of a crash in 1986.

Royal Navy

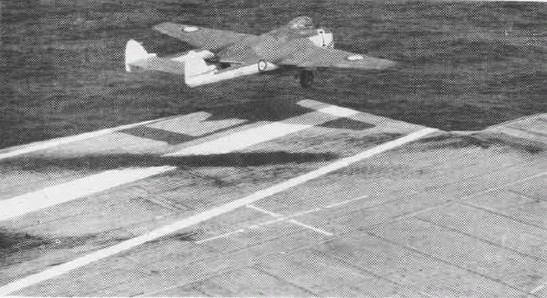
Royal Navy Sea Vampire making a touch-and-go landing on the U.S. aircraft carrier USS Antietam (CVA-36)

The Admiralty had immediately taken great interest in the Vampire following a series of carrier-landing trials which had been conducted on the aircraft carrier HMS Ocean using the modified third prototype of the Vampire in December 1945. At one point, the service had been allegedly considering the adoption of the type as the standard naval fighter to equip the Fleet Air Arm with; however, according to Mason, there had been a prevailing attitude that carrier operations lacked the flexibility to enable combat operations to be conducted with jet aircraft while at sea due to factors such as jet blast and the limited range of the early jets. In 1947, the Royal Navy decided to place an order for a navalised variant of the Vampire FB.5, which had been separately ordered by Air Ministry; the navalised model was quickly given the name Sea Vampire.

The Sea Vampire had several key differences from their land-based counterparts. It could be easily distinguished by the presence of a V-shaped arrester hook that retracted to a high-mounted position above the jet pipe. The Sea Vampire was fitted with enlarged air brakes and landing flaps for superior low-speed control during landing approaches, along with stronger construction for the higher stresses involved in carrier landings and catapult launches.

On 15 October 1948, the first Sea Vampire performed its maiden flight. A pair of prototypes were followed by 18 production aircraft which were used to gain experience in carrier jet operations before the arrival of the two-seat Sea Vampire T.22 trainers. The Sea Vampire was initially delivered to 700 Naval Air Squadron and 702 Naval Air Squadron, soon replacing their piston-engine powered de Havilland Sea Hornets.

=== Australia ===
During 1946, government approval was given for the purchase of an initial 50 Vampire fighter aircraft for the Royal Australian Air Force (RAAF). The first three machines of this batch were British-built aircraft, an F1, F2 and FB.5, and were given serial numbers A78-1 to A78-3. The second aircraft, the F2 (A78-2), was significant in that it was powered by the more powerful Rolls-Royce Nene jet engine, rather than the standard Goblin unit.

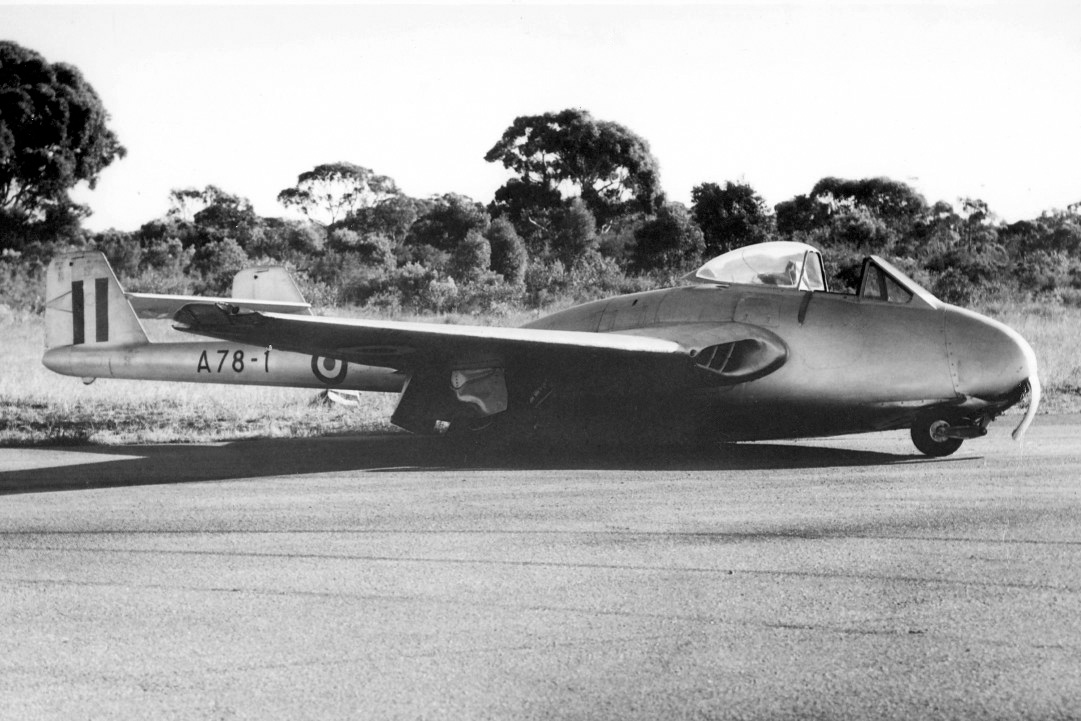
The Vampire F1 A78-1 after crash landing at RAAF Base Point Cook in 1947

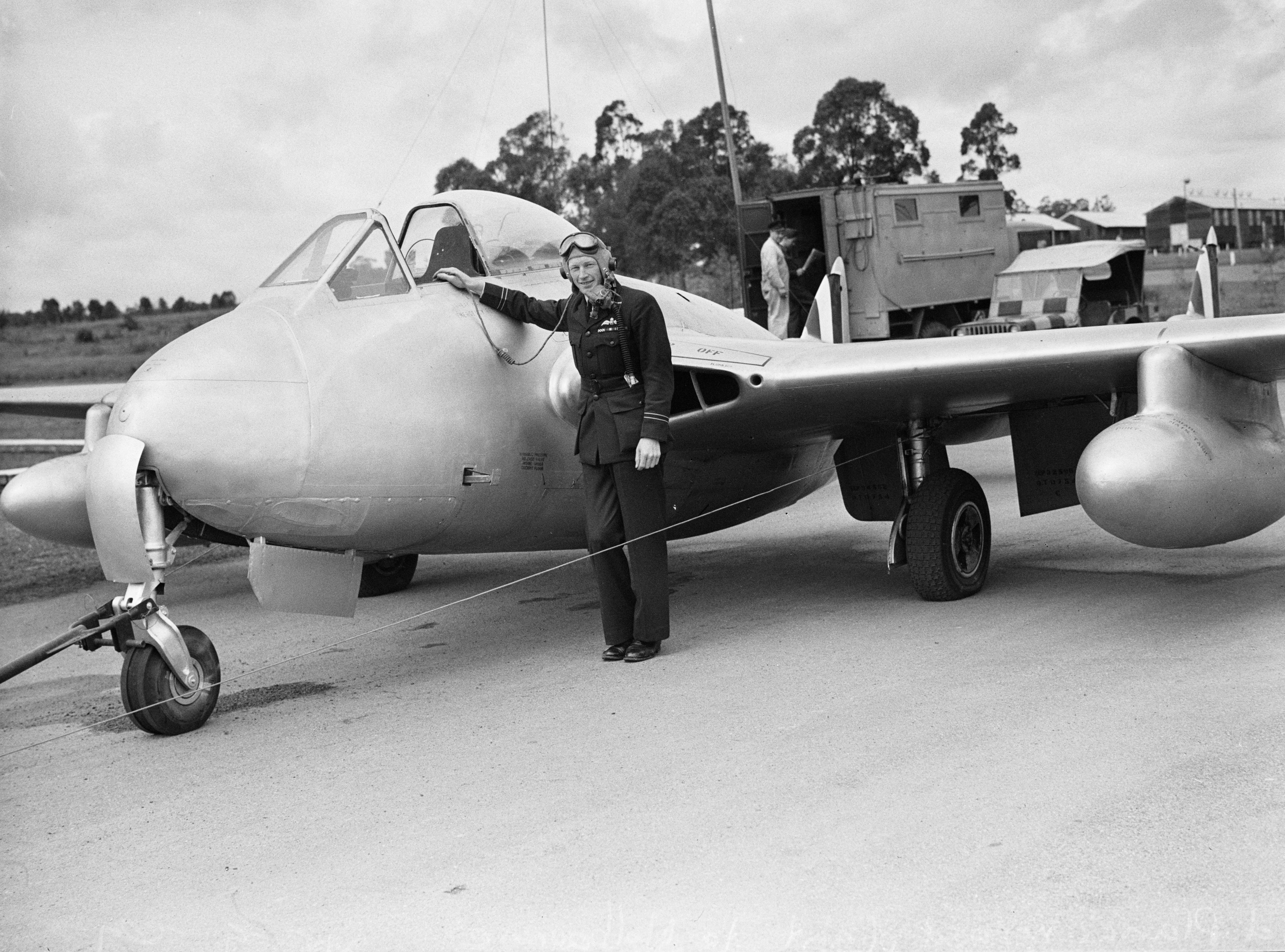
Vampire jet after record flight to Melbourne, Australia, 21 July 1949

All of the 80 F.30 fighters and FB.31 fighter-bomber Vampires that were subsequently built by de Havilland Australia were powered by Commonwealth Aircraft Corporation (CAC) versions of the Nene engine manufactured under licence at their facility in Melbourne. The Nene required a greater intake cross-section than the Goblin, and the initial solution was to mount auxiliary intakes on top of the fuselage behind the canopy. Unfortunately these intakes led to elevator blanking on formation of shock waves, and three aircraft and pilots were lost in unrecoverable dives. All of the Nene-engined aircraft were later modified to move the auxiliary intakes beneath the fuselage, thus entirely avoiding the problem.

In June 1949, the first Vampire F.30 fighter (A79-1) made its first flight; it was followed by 56 more F.30 variants before the final 23 aircraft were completed as FB.31s, being fitted with strengthened and clipped wings along with underwing hardpoints. A single F.30 was also converted to the F.32 standard, which was almost identical to the Vampire FB.9. In 1954, all single seat Vampires were retired by the RAAF, but remained in service in Citizen Air Force squadrons until the early 1960s.

The Vampire T.33 was a two-seat training version, powered by the Goblin turbojet and built in Australia. T.34 and T.35 were used by the RAAF and the Royal Australian Navy (RAN). (In RAAF service they were known as Mk33 through to Mk35W.) Many were manufactured or assembled at de Havilland Australia's facilities in Sydney. The Mk35W was a Mk35 fitted with spare Mk33 wings following overstress or achievement of fatigue life. Vampire trainer production in Australia amounted to 110 aircraft, and the initial order was filled by 35 T.33s for the RAAF; deliveries being made in 1952 with five T.34s for the RAN delivered in 1954. Additional Vampires were imported from Britain during the mid-to-late 1950s. The trainers remained in service in the RAAF until September 1970, and in the RAN until 1971, when they were replaced by the Macchi MB-326.

=== Canada ===
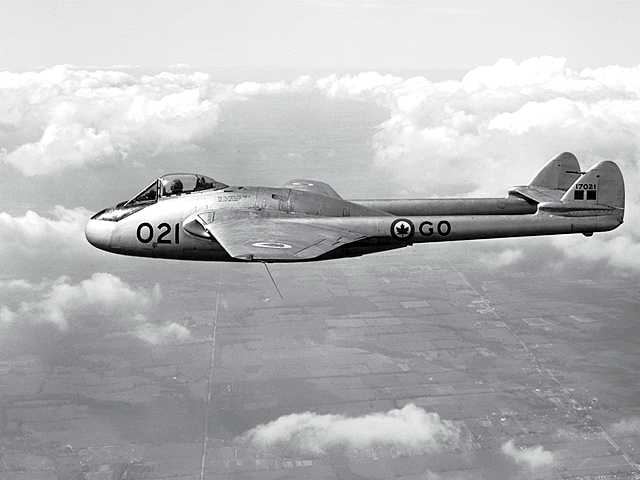
Royal Canadian Air Force Vampire

A single Vampire F.1 began operating in 1946 on an evaluation basis in Canada at the Winter Experimental Establishment in Edmonton. The Vampire F.3 was selected as one of two types of operational fighters for the Royal Canadian Air Force (RCAF) and was first flown in Canada on 17 January 1948 where it went into service as a Central Flying School training aircraft at RCAF Station Trenton. Operating a total of 86 aircraft, the Vampire F.3 became the first jet fighter to enter RCAF service in any significant numbers.

The Vampire had the function of introducing Canadian fighter pilots not only to jet propulsion, but also to other amenities such as cockpit pressurisation and the tricycle landing gear arrangement. It proved to be a popular aircraft, being easy to fly and often considered a "hot rod." In Canadian service, the Vampire served in both operational and air reserve units (400, 401, 402, 411, 438 and 442 squadrons). For three years from 2 May 1949 to 22 August 1951 the RCAF aerobatic team "The Blue Devils" flew airshows throughout North America. In November 1956, the type was retired having been replaced in RCAF service by the Canadair Sabre.

=== Dominican Republic ===
The Dominican Air Force purchased 25 of Sweden's Vampires in 1952. Some of these subsequently saw combat in 1959, preventing an attempted amphibious landing by Cuban revolutionaries. They later took part in the 1965 Dominican Civil War.

=== Egypt ===
The Egyptian Air Force received its first of a planned 66 Vampire FB.52s in December 1950, eventually receiving 50 from de Havilland production. An order for 12 Vampire NF.10 night fighters was cancelled owing to an arms embargo and the aircraft were acquired by the RAF. A factory was built at Helwan to build the Vampire under licence, but political disputes between Egypt and the United Kingdom over the presence of British troops in Egypt led to the project being delayed, before being abandoned following the Egyptian revolution of 1952. Instead, Egypt turned to Italy, and purchased 58 ex-Italian Air Force FB.52As, using Syria as an intermediary, with deliveries from 1955 to 1956.

By 1954, Egypt was operating a fleet of 49 Vampires, which had been acquired from both Italy and Britain, in the fighter-bomber role. In 1955, a further 12 Vampire trainers were ordered, deliveries of which started in July that year. On 1 September 1955, in a response to an Israeli commando raid on an Egyptian-held fort at Khan Yunis, four Egyptian Vampires crossed into Israeli airspace, but were intercepted by Israeli Meteor jets, with two Vampires being shot down. By 1956, Egyptian Vampires were in the process of being replaced in the front-line fighter role by the much more capable Mikoyan-Gurevich MiG-15 and MiG-17 swept-wing fighters, and several Vampires were given to Saudi Arabia and Jordan. During the Suez Crisis, the Egyptians mainly used their Vampires for ground-attack missions against the advancing Israeli forces, particularly at the Mitla Pass, and are recorded as having lost a total of four Vampires in combat with Israeli jet aircraft. Several more were destroyed on the ground by Anglo-French air raids.

=== Finland ===
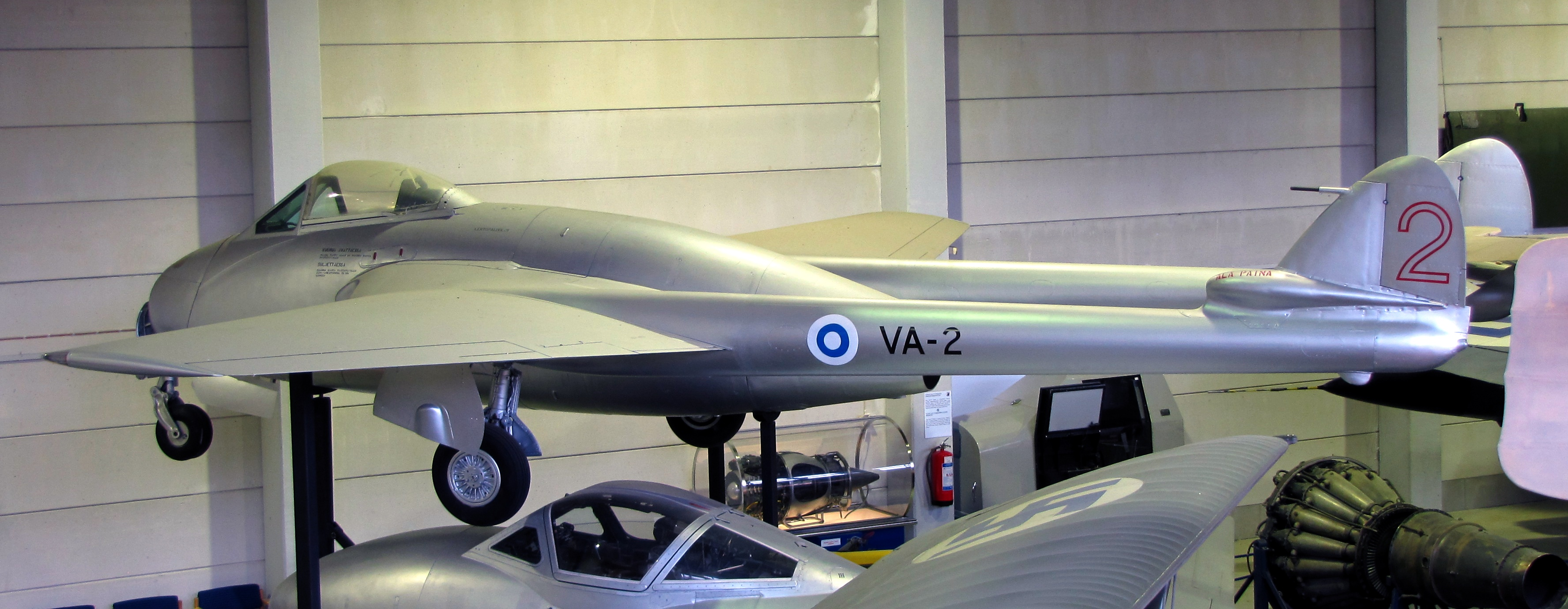
Finnish Air Force de Havilland Vampire Mk.52

The Finnish Air Force received six FB.52 Vampires in 1953. The model was nicknamed "Vamppi" in Finnish service. An additional nine twin-seat T.55s were purchased in 1955. The aircraft were assigned to 2nd Wing at Pori, but were transferred to 1st Wing at Tikkakoski at the end of the 1950s. The last Finnish Vampire was decommissioned in 1965.

=== France ===
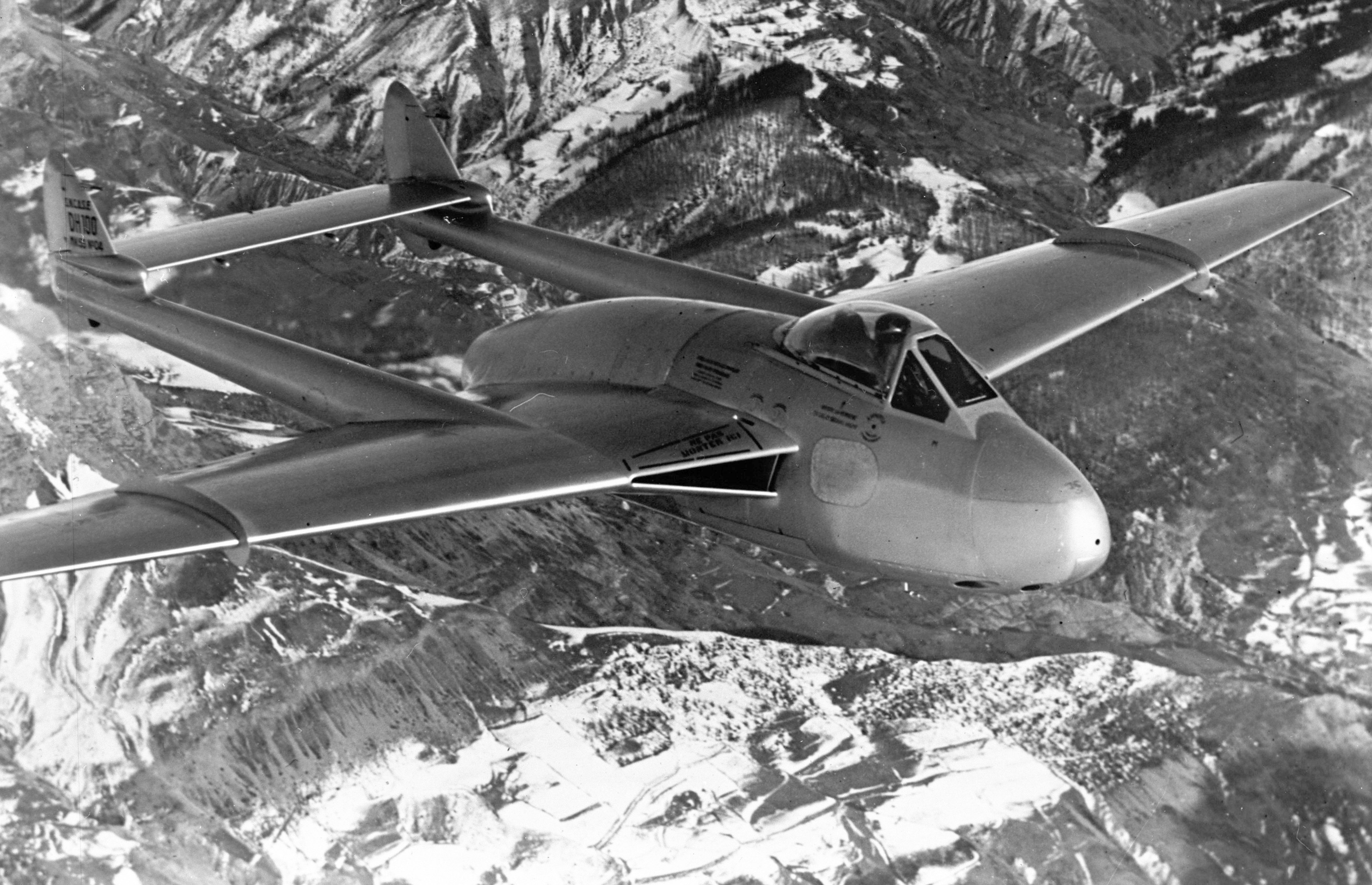
A French Vampire, circa 1948

As part of a larger effort to build up the post-war French Air Force, a number of Goblin-powered Vampire FB.5s were delivered to France from 1949 onwards. This variant of the Vampire was subsequently manufactured under licence by Sud-Est at Marignane, the first 67 aircraft were assembled from British-produced components and were standard aircraft for the most part; these were followed by a further 183 Vampires, which incorporated a greater proportion of French-produced elements. The French developed the FB.53 model, a Nene-powered variant, which was named in French service as the Mistral after the wind of the same name. The Nene engine was alleged to be responsible for the Mistral having greater rate of climb and a higher top speed than the standard Vampire.

A total of 250 Mistrals were built, equipped with Hispano-Suiza built engines, French ejector seats and enlarged wing root ducts. French orders for the type were greatly expanded during the early 1950s as a reaction to the outbreak of the Korean War. The production line was converted for the license-production of the improved de Havilland Sea Venom by the end of 1952 as well. On 2 April 1951, the first Mistral made its maiden flight.

=== India ===
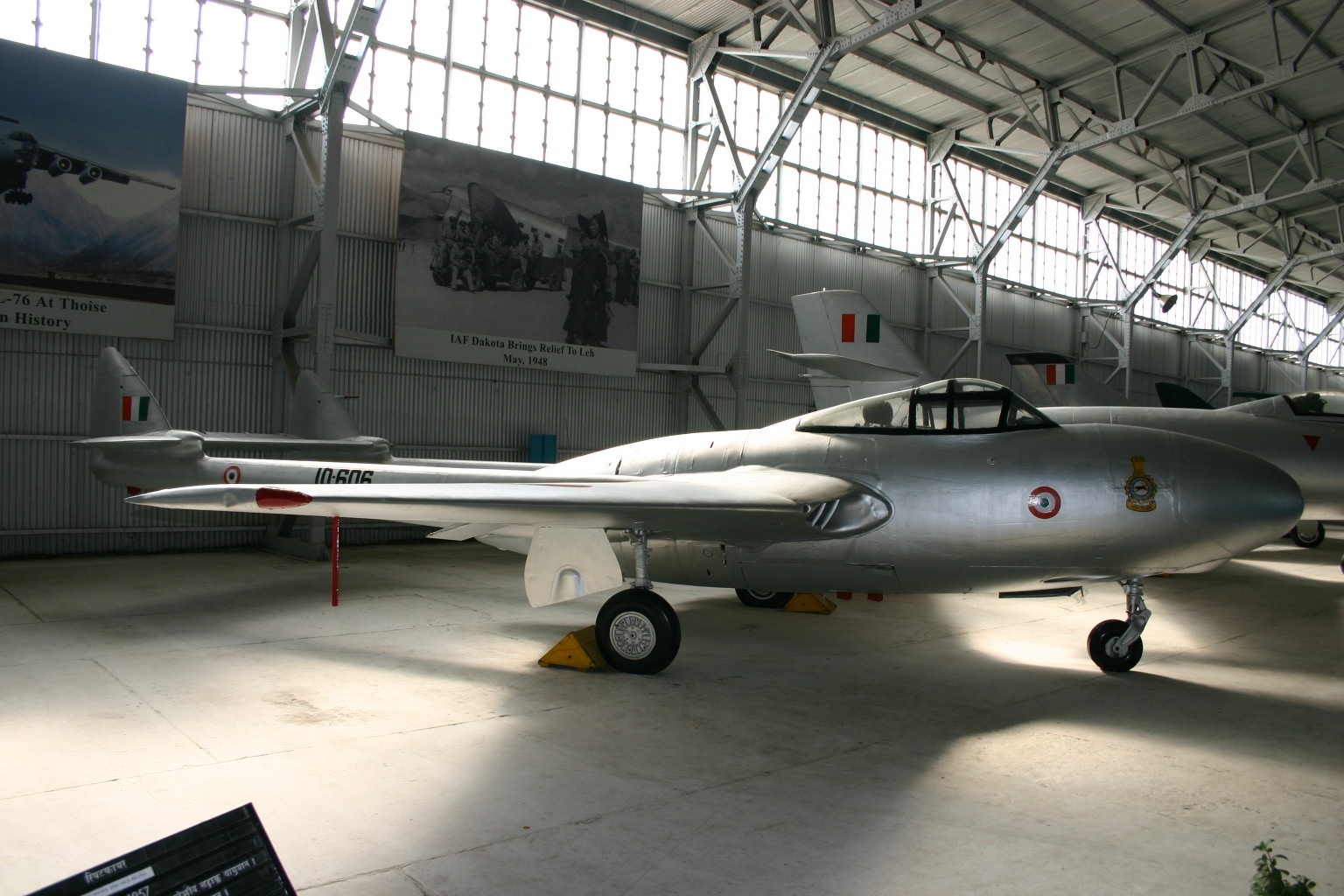
A preserved IAF Vampire at Indian Air Force Museum, Palam

On 6 November 1948, the Indian Air Force (IAF) took delivery of its first three de Havilland Vampires at Palam Air Force Station, Delhi; these were procured under a large-scale expansion and modernisation programme. As its introduction marked the IAF's transition into the jet age, the Vampire presented several challenges to the service, including maintenance difficulties and the need to adopt new operational doctrines. Despite these hurdles, the Vampire played a crucial role in modernizing the IAF and laid the foundation for its future jet operations.

The first unit to received the type was No. 7 Squadron IAF in January 1949. No. 37 Squadron IAF flew a number of Vampire NF54 night reconnaissance missions over Goa during the 1961 Annexation of Goa from Portuguese rule, sometimes coming under anti-aircraft fire. A flight of four IAF Vampires managed to sink a Portuguese patrol vessel off the coast of Diu, using cannon fire and rockets. The remaining Vampires were assigned to defend Bombay and Delhi. India would also acquire 30 of the NF.54 night fighter variant in two tranches (18 in 1954 and 12 in 1957), refurbished from NF.10s being retired from RAF service. They were primarily intended to Intercept Pakistani Halifax bombers and escort IAF B-24 Liberators in the event of a conflict, though they were nearing retirement by the end of 1964 as squadrons started to convert to the Hawker Hunter and MiG-21's. They were often paired with Marconi T-13/14/15 radar stations for GCI interceptions.

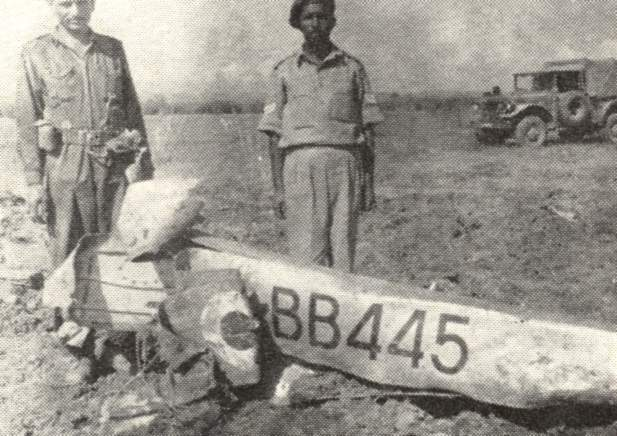
Wreckage of an IAF Vampire shot down in 1965

On 1 September 1965, during the Indo-Pakistani War, No. 45 Squadron IAF responded to a request for strikes against a counter-attack by the Pakistani Army (Operation Grand Slam), and twelve Vampire Mk 52 fighter-bombers were successful in slowing the Pakistani advance. However, the Vampires encountered two Pakistan Air Force (PAF) F-86 Sabres, armed with air-to-air missiles; in the ensuing dogfight, the outdated Vampires were outclassed. One was shot down by ground fire and another three were shot down by Sabres. The Vampires were mostly withdrawn from front line service after these losses, and assigned to training roles ahead of the induction of the HAL HJT-16 Kiran. However a few Vampires did see service in the 1971 Indo-Pakistani war, flying nighttime interdiction sorties, where they attacked Pakistani armour positions, Railway yards and Roads, mostly by cannon fire.

=== Ireland ===
The Vampire entered service with the Irish Air Corps in 1955, and was the first ever jet powered fighter aircraft in Ireland. A total of six Vampire T.55s were acquired and served under No.1 Fighter Squadron, stationed at Casement Air Base. The Vampires replaced the Supermarine Spitfire and Seafire as Ireland's main combat aircraft. The Vampire brought the jet age to Ireland and introduced heavier armaments through the Vampire's cannons, as well as new technology such as ejection seats. The Vampires served until 1975 and were replaced with six Fouga CM.170 Magisters.

=== Italy ===
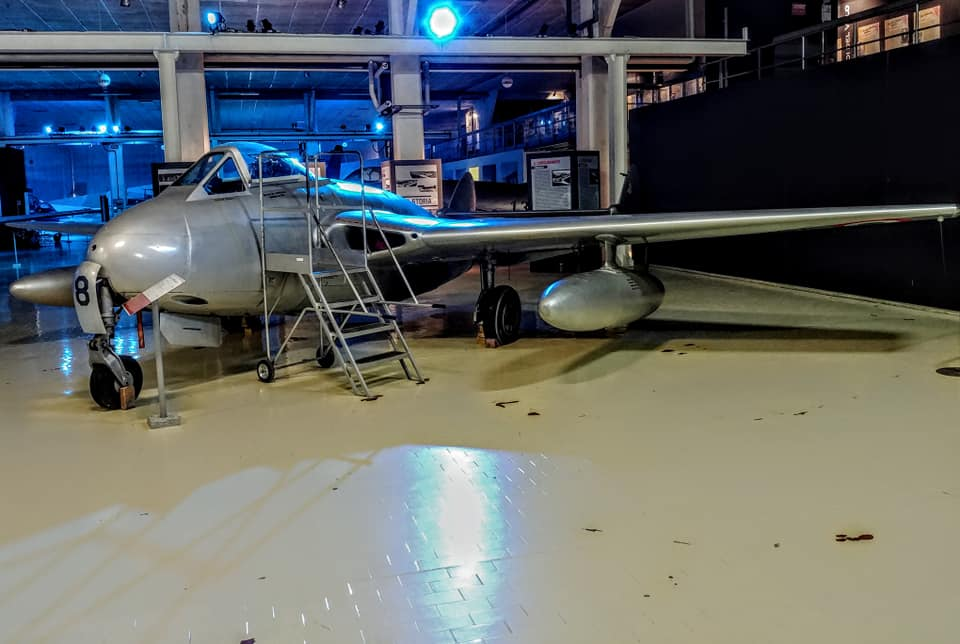
de Havilland Vampire at the Volandia Museum of Malpensa Airport

During the late 1940s, Italy became interested in procuring the Vampire as part of its re-equipment programme following the Second World War. The Meteor had also been considered, but was discarded on grounds of cost. At the invitation of Italian Air Force, a series of aerial demonstrations at Italian air shows were performed by British Vampires during September 1949. On 24 October 1949, an agreement was struck with Fiat to license manufacture the type at its plant in Turin; additional work type would also be undertaken by Macchi at Varese; the agreement included five Vampire FB.5, 51 Vampire FB.52, four Vampire NF.10 and ten Vampire NF.54 to be built in the United Kingdom; a total of 150 Vampire FB.52s were also built in Italy under licence.

On 11 March 1950, the first five Vampire FB.5s arrived at the Jet Flight Training School at Foggia. British-built Vampires were delivered in advance of their Italian counterparts as the latter needed more time to establish their production line. During the early 1950s, Italian Vampires were flown by the Cavallino Rampante, the Italian Air Force's first post-war aerial display team. Following Britain's embargo on the sale of military aircraft to Egypt, 58 ex-Italian Air Force Vampires were refurbished and transferred to Egypt during early 1956; Macchi built 45 additional Vampires to replace these in Italian service.

=== Japan ===
In 1956, the Japan Air Self-Defence Force received a single Vampire T.55 jet trainer for evaluation. Although the type was not chosen for further orders, the aircraft remained in Japan after the completion of its evaluation by the JASDF, and was placed on display at Hamamatsu Air Base in Shizuoka Prefecture.

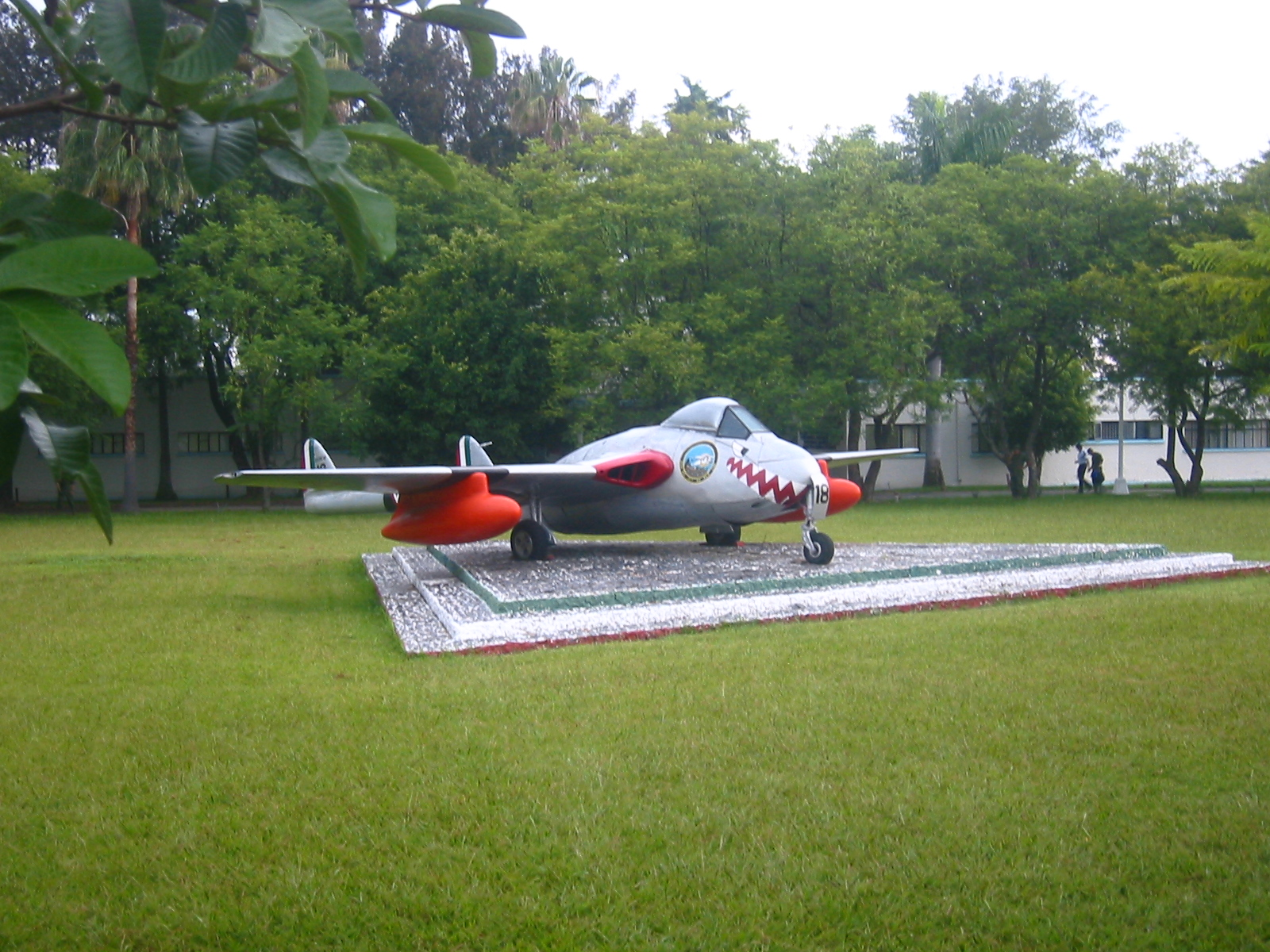
A de Havilland Vampire MK-III from Mexican Air Force exhibited at el Colegio del Aire in Zapopan, Jalisco

=== Mexico ===
In 1961, the Mexican Air Force purchased 15 Vampire MK.IIIs, which had previously served in the Royal Canadian Air Force (RCAF). Six years later, all aircraft were decommissioned following six aircraft losses in accidents related to mechanical failure. Currently, there are four complete aircraft that have been preserved for exhibition only.

=== Norway ===
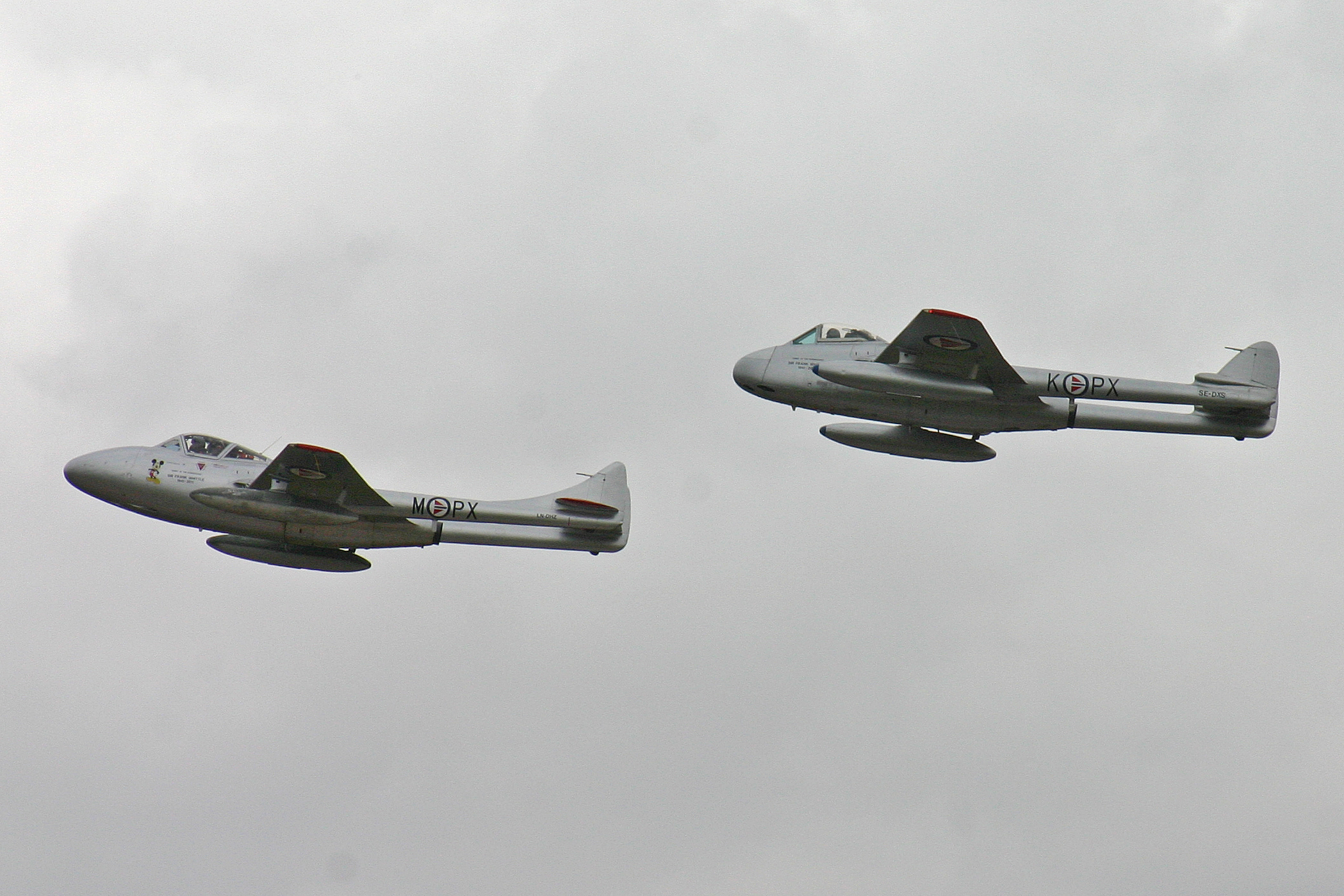
Vampire T55 & FB6 in Norwegian livery

The Royal Norwegian Air Force (RNoAF) purchased a total of 20 Vampire F.3s, 36 FB.52s and six T.55 trainers. The Vampire was in Norwegian use as a fighter from 1948 to 1957, equipping a three-squadron Vampire wing stationed at Gardermoen. In 1957, the type was withdrawn when the RNoAF decided to re-equip with the Republic F-84G Thunderjet. In 1955, the Vampire trainers were replaced by the Lockheed T-33, these aircraft were returned to the United Kingdom and saw later use by the Royal Air Force.

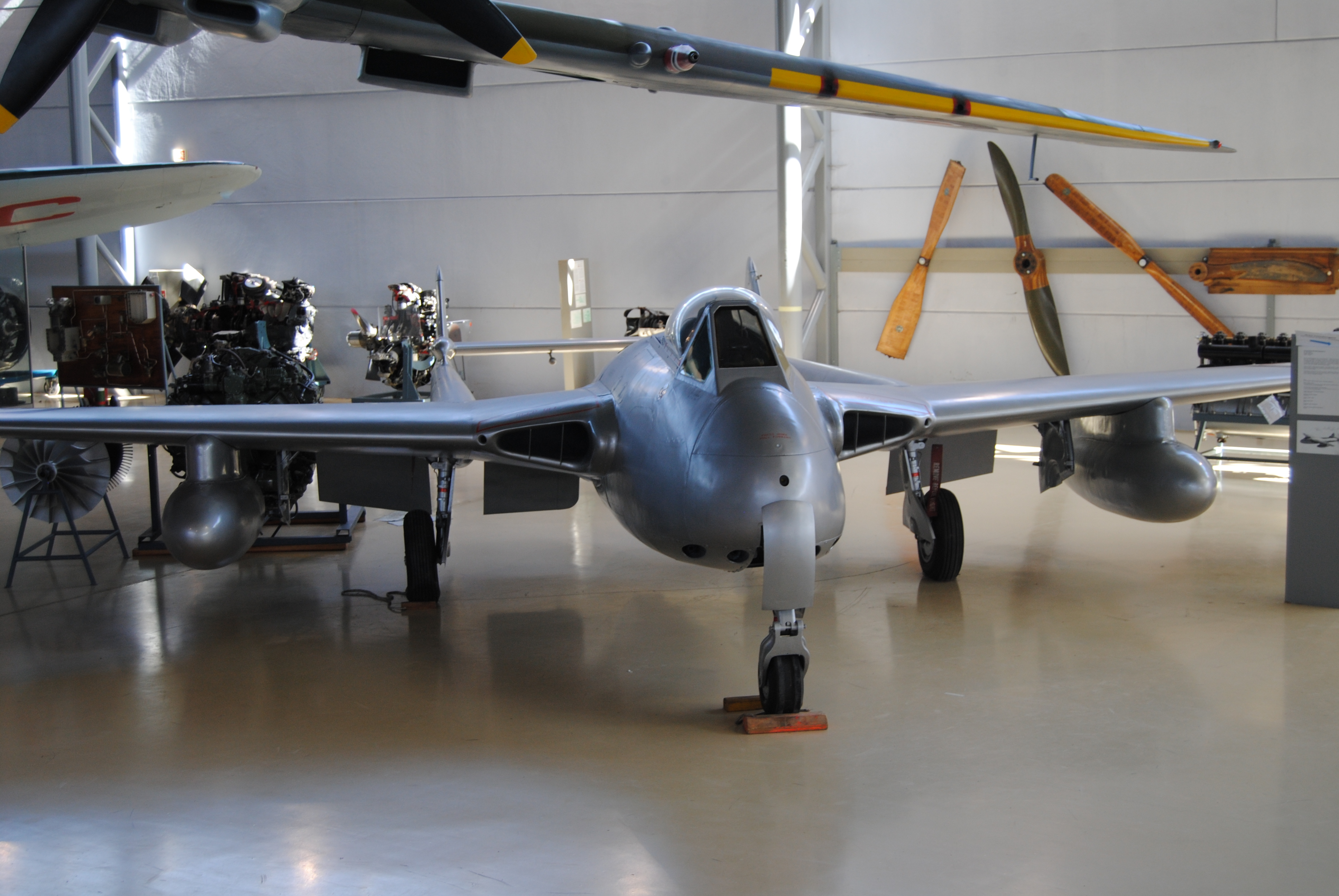
A RNoAF Vampire F.3 displayed at the Norwegian Armed Forces Aircraft Collection

=== Rhodesia/Zimbabwe ===
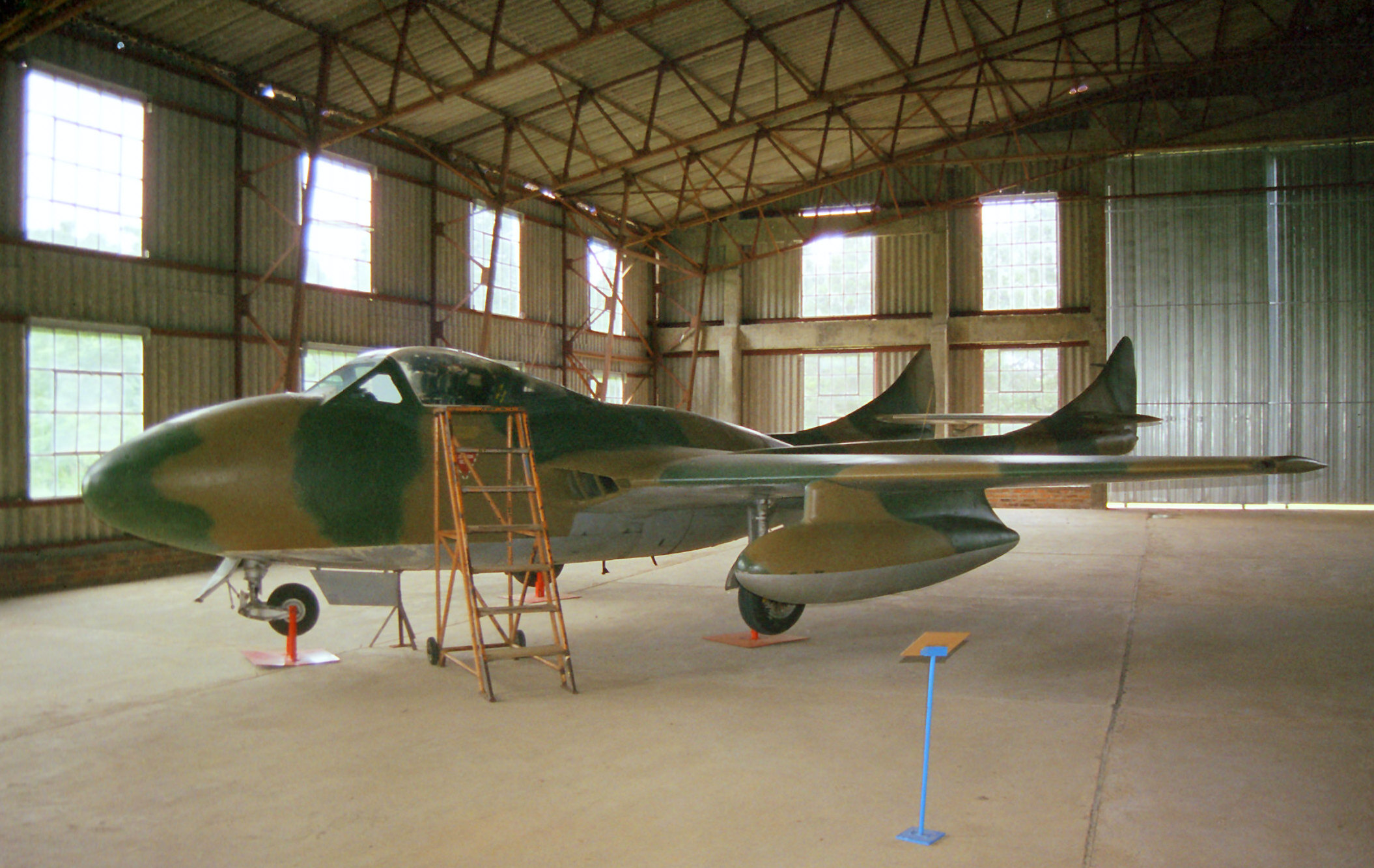
ex-Rhodesian Air Force De Havilland Vampire T.11 (DH.115)

The Rhodesian Air Force acquired 16 Vampire FB.9 fighters and a further 16 Vampire T.11 trainers in the early 1950s, its first jet aircraft, equipping two squadrons. These were regularly deployed to Aden between 1957 and 1961, supporting British counter-insurgency operations. 21 more two-seaters and 13 single-seaters were supplied by South Africa in the late 1960s and early 1970s. In 1977, six were pressed into service for Operation Dingo. Rhodesia operated Vampires until the end of the bush war in 1979; afterwards they remained in service with the Air Force of Zimbabwe. They were eventually replaced by the BAE Hawk 60 in the early 1980s. After 30 years service, they were the last Vampires used on operations anywhere.

=== South Africa ===
A total of 50 DH.100 and a total of 27 DH.115 Vampire aircraft were delivered to the South African Air Force.

=== Sweden ===
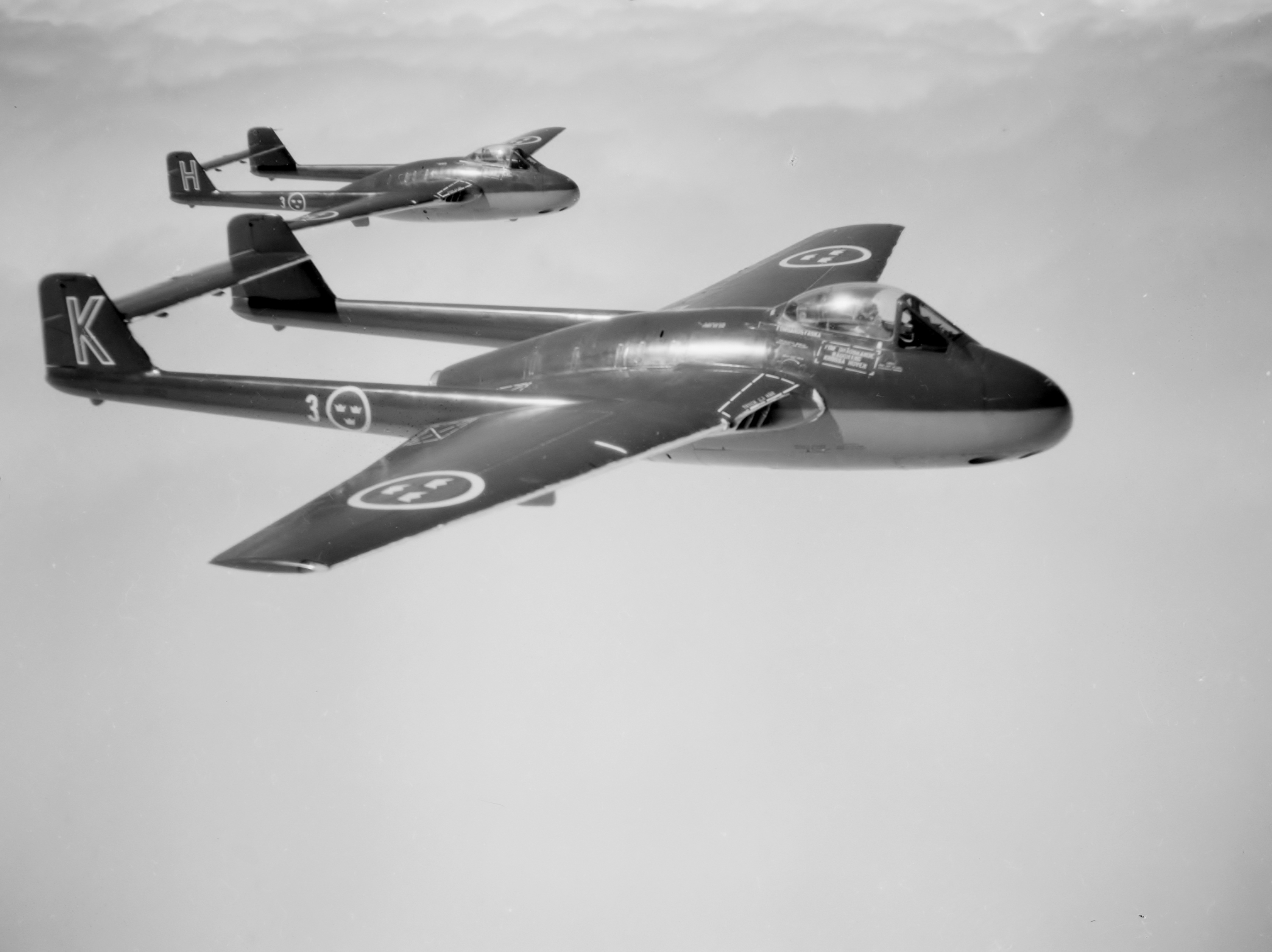
Two Swedish Air Force de Havilland Vampires

In 1946, the Swedish Air Force purchased its first batch of 70 FB 1 Vampires, having looked for a jet-powered fighter to replace the outdated J 22 and SAAB 21 aircraft of its fighter force. In Swedish service, the Vampire received the designation J 28A, with the first aircraft assigned to the Bråvalla Wing (F 13). The type provided such good service that the Vampire was soon selected to serve as the backbone of the fighter force. In 1949, a total of 310 of the more modern FB.50s, based on the Vampire FB.5, were procured and designated J 28B. The last of these was delivered in 1952, after which all piston-engined fighters were decommissioned. In addition, a total of 57 two-seater DH.115 Vampires, designated J 28C, were also acquired for training purposes.

In 1956, the Swedish Vampires were retired from the fighter role, replaced in service with the J 29 (SAAB Tunnan) and J 34 (Hawker Hunter). In 1968, the final Vampire trainer was retired, all having been replaced by the SK 60 (SAAB 105).

=== Switzerland ===
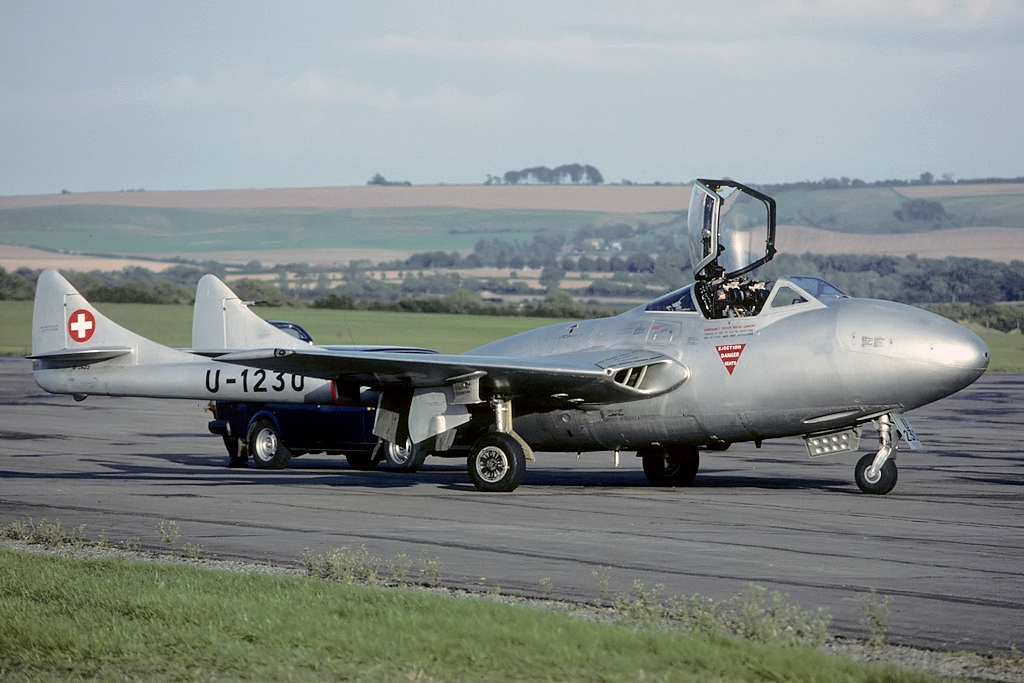
Swiss Air Force de Havilland Vampire T55

In 1946, the Swiss Air Force purchased an initial four Vampire F.1s, one of which crashed on 2 August 1946 while the other three remained in service until 1961. In 1949, the Swiss government signed a contract to locally manufacture the Vampire FB.6 in Switzerland using British-built Goblin engines; accordingly, a batch of 85 Vampire FB.6s were produced. In 1952, the first production Vampire NF.10 was delivered to Switzerland for evaluation purposes.

In 1949, the first batch of 75 Vampire Mk.6 (J-1005 to J-1079) was purchased. Most of these were phased out of service in 1968/1969, the last aircraft being withdrawn in 1973. A second batch of 100 Vampire Mk.6 (J-1101 to J-1200) were built under licence by a consortium of Swiss aviation companies, including Eidgenössische Flugzeugwerke Emmen, Pilatus Aircraft and Flug- und Fahrzeugwerke Altenrhein. Aircraft from this batch were in use from 1951 to 1974, of which some were used for pilot training and as target aircraft until 1990. A further three DH-100 Mk.6 (serials J-1080 to J-1082) were subsequently built from remaining spare parts. A force of 39 DH.115 Mk 55 Vampire two-seat trainers (U-1201 to U-1239) were also in service from 1953 to 1990. During the late 1950s, Switzerland started procuring Hawker Hunters to replace their Vampire fleet in the fighter role.

== Variants ==
=== DH.100 Vampire single seat day fighter/fighter-bomber ===
F.1 (alternatively F.Mk 1 or Mk.1)
single-seat fighter version for the RAF; Three prototypes (named Spider Crab) built for specification E.6/41. 228 production aircraft built, including 70 for Sweden as the J 28A for familiarization. 30 ex-RAF F.1s were transferred to the Armee de l'Air in 1948 for familiarization. TG431 was supplied to Royal Australian Air Force (RAAF) as A78-1 in May 1947 for familiarization. TG278 was modified with extended wings and powered with a Ghost 2.
F.2
Nene-powered prototypes. Two built and three conversions. TX807 was supplied to RAAF as A78-2 in August 1948 for familiarization and technical development.
F.3
single-seat fighter for the RAF. Two prototypes converted from F.1s; 224 were built, 20 were exported to Norway, and 150 to Canada for the Royal Canadian Air Force.
F.4
Nene-powered project, none built.
FB.5
Goblin 2 powered single-seat fighter-bomber with clipped wings; 1123 built, including 930 for the RAF. 94 ex-RAF FB.5s were transferred to the Armee de l'Air in 1949 for operational squadrons. VV465 was supplied to RAAF as A78-3 in May 1949 for familiarization.
FB.6
Goblin 3 powered single-seat fighter-bomber; 175 were built in UK plus 310 built in Sweden as the J 28B and 103 built in Switzerland, including three from spares.
F.8
Ghost-powered F.1 conversion as prototype for de Havilland Venom; One built.
FB.9
tropicalised Goblin-3 powered F.5 fighter-bomber with air conditioning; 348 built, most by de Havilland, and some by Fairey.

=== Export variants ===
F.30
Nene-powered single-seat fighter-bomber for the Royal Australian Air Force; 57 built in Australia by the De Havilland Australia (DHA).
FB.31
Nene-powered upgraded F.30, 28 F.30s converted and 23 built new by De Havilland Australia.
F.32
F.30 with air conditioning; One converted in Australia by De Havilland Australia.
FB.50
exports to Sweden as the J 28B; 310 built, 12 later rebuilt as T.55s.
FB.51
exports to France. 67 built from DH-supplied knockdown kits, 20 built in France by Sud-Est.
FB.52
export FB.6, 546 built including 247 by Hindustan Aircraft Limited
FB.52A
export FB.6 for Aeronautica Militare Italiana; 51 imported and 150 built in Italy by Macchi and Fiat.
FB.53
export single-seat fighter-bombers as patterns for Armee de l'Air to be built by SNCASE

=== DH.113 Vampire Night Fighters ===
NF.10
Goblin-powered two-seat night fighter version for RAF; 81 built including 3 prototypes.
NF.54
export NF.10. Italian Air Force bought 14, and India bought 30 refurbished NF.10s.

=== DH.115 Vampire Trainers ===
NF(T).10
navigation trainer based on NF.10; 36 converted
T.11
private venture Goblin 35 powered two-seat trainer; 526 built by de Havilland and Fairey including one prototype. Some had ejection seats.
T.22
T.11 trainer for Royal Navy; 73 built.
T.33
two-seat trainer based in early specification T.11. Powered by the Goblin turbojet; 36 were built in Australia by de Havilland Australia.
T.33A
upgraded T.33 to late T.11 specification.
T.34
navalized two-seat T.22 trainer for the Royal Australian Navy; five built in Australia by De Havilland Australia. A sixth was delivered as a T.34A
T.34A
T.34 upgraded with ejection seats.
T.35
late T.11 specification two-seat trainers; 68 built in Australia by De Havilland Australia.
T.35A
T.35 upgraded from T.33.
T.55
export trainer; 322 built including 30 in Switzerland, 60 in India by HAL and six converted from T.11s.
PR.55
At least 5 T.55s were modified in India for photo reconnaissance.

=== Sea Vampire ===
F.1
prototype for deck trials, one conversion from Vampire F.1.
F.20
navalised FB.5; 18 converted by English Electric.
F.21
F.3s with strengthened belly and arrester hook for trials of undercarriage-less landings on flexible decks; two built and/or six converted.
T.22
two-seat trainer for Royal Navy; 73 built by de Havilland.

=== SNCASE (Sud-Est) Mistral ===
SE.530 Mistral
Hispano-Nene powered prototypes based on FB.53 for French production; 4 built
SE.532 Mistral
production version; 93 built.
SE.535 Mistral
SE 532 development; 150 built.

=== Flygvapnet ===
J 28A
Swedish F.1 with wings later clipped similarly to F.5; 70 imported.
J 28B
Swedish FB.6, 310 built.
A 28B
J 28B/FB.6 relegated to attack role.
J 28C-1
early specification T.55 Vampire Trainer, 30 purchased in 1952. Initially used in a fighter role.
J 28C-2
late specification T.55, 15 purchased in 1955.
J 28C-3
former J 28B single seater fighters converted to T.55A two seater trainers by de Havilland in 1956, 12 converted.

=== de Havilland Australia ===
P.17
project trainer with local cockpit alterations.

== Operators ==
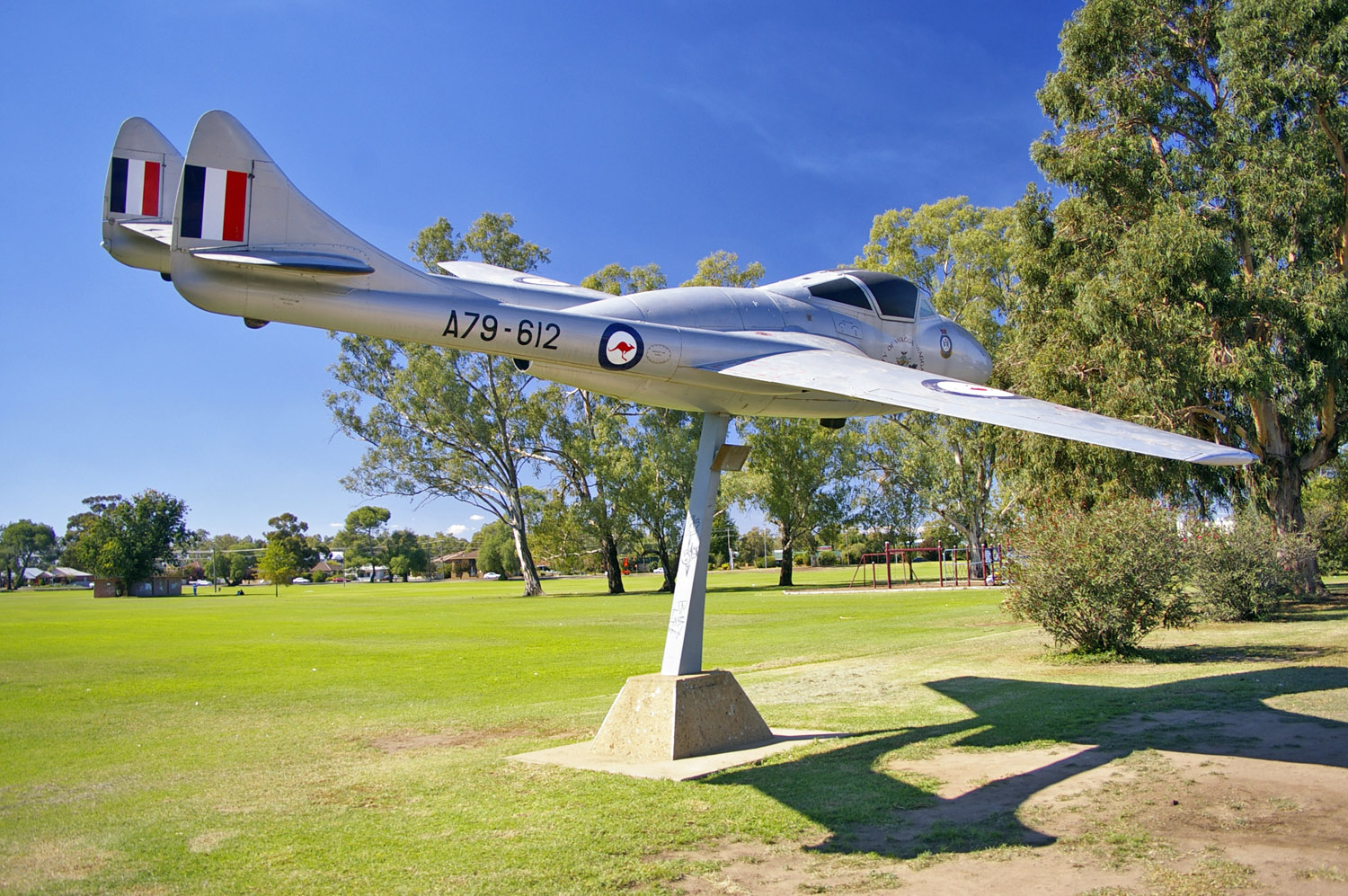
de Havilland Vampire T.35 (A79-612) in Wagga Wagga, New South Wales, Australia

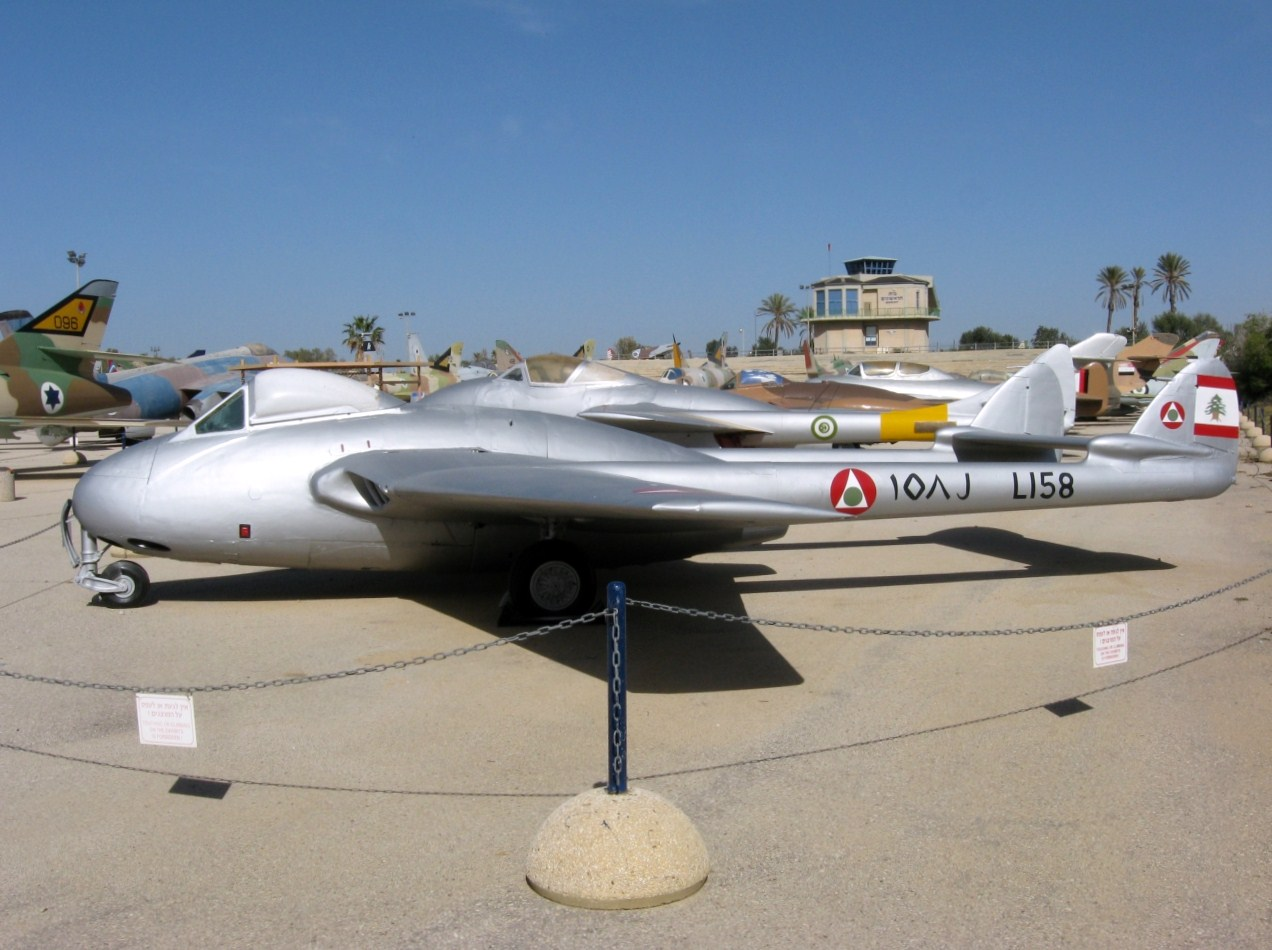
Vampire bearing Lebanese colours at Hatzerim, Israel

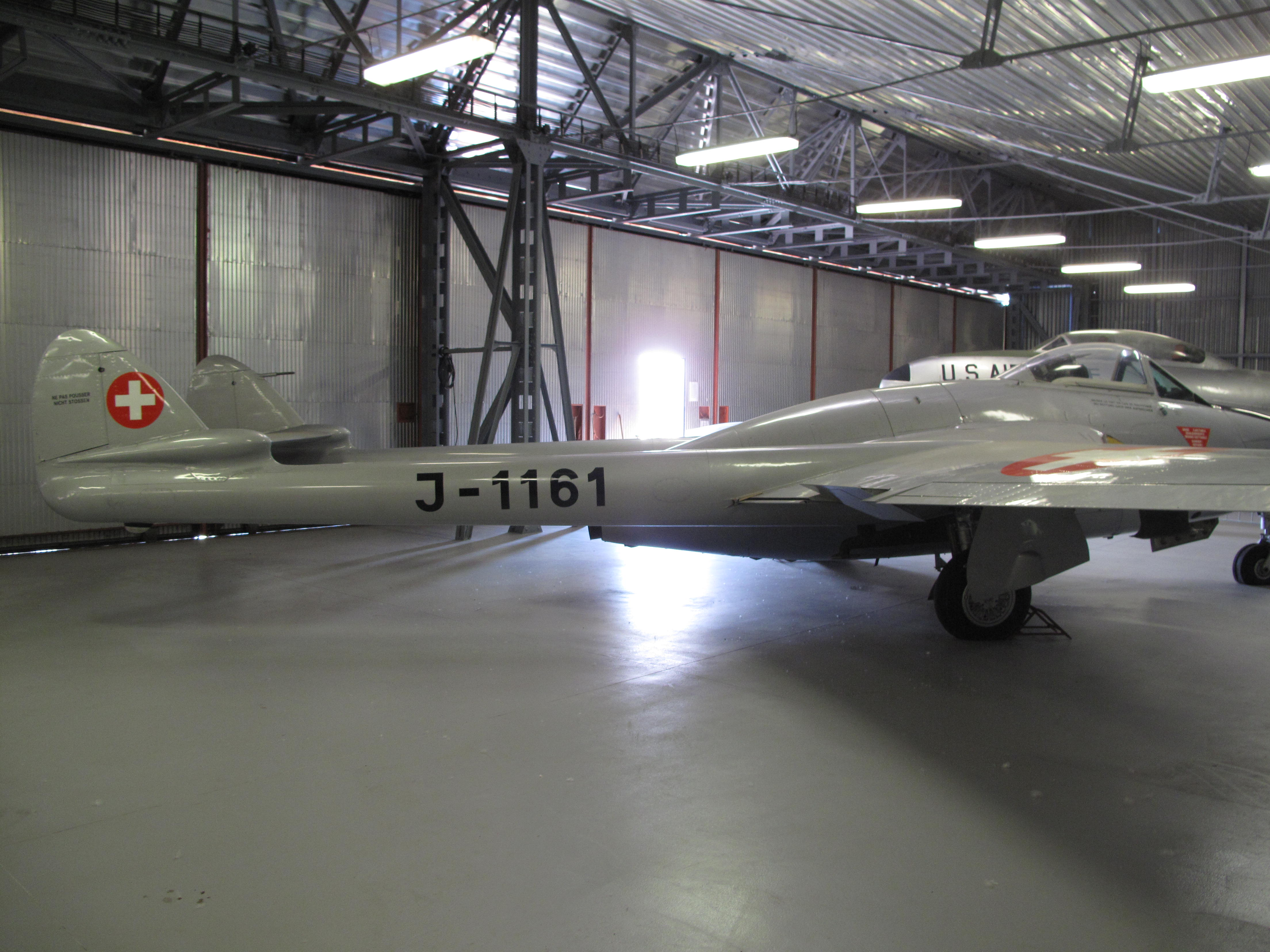
Swiss Air Force Vampire at Letecké muzeum Kbely

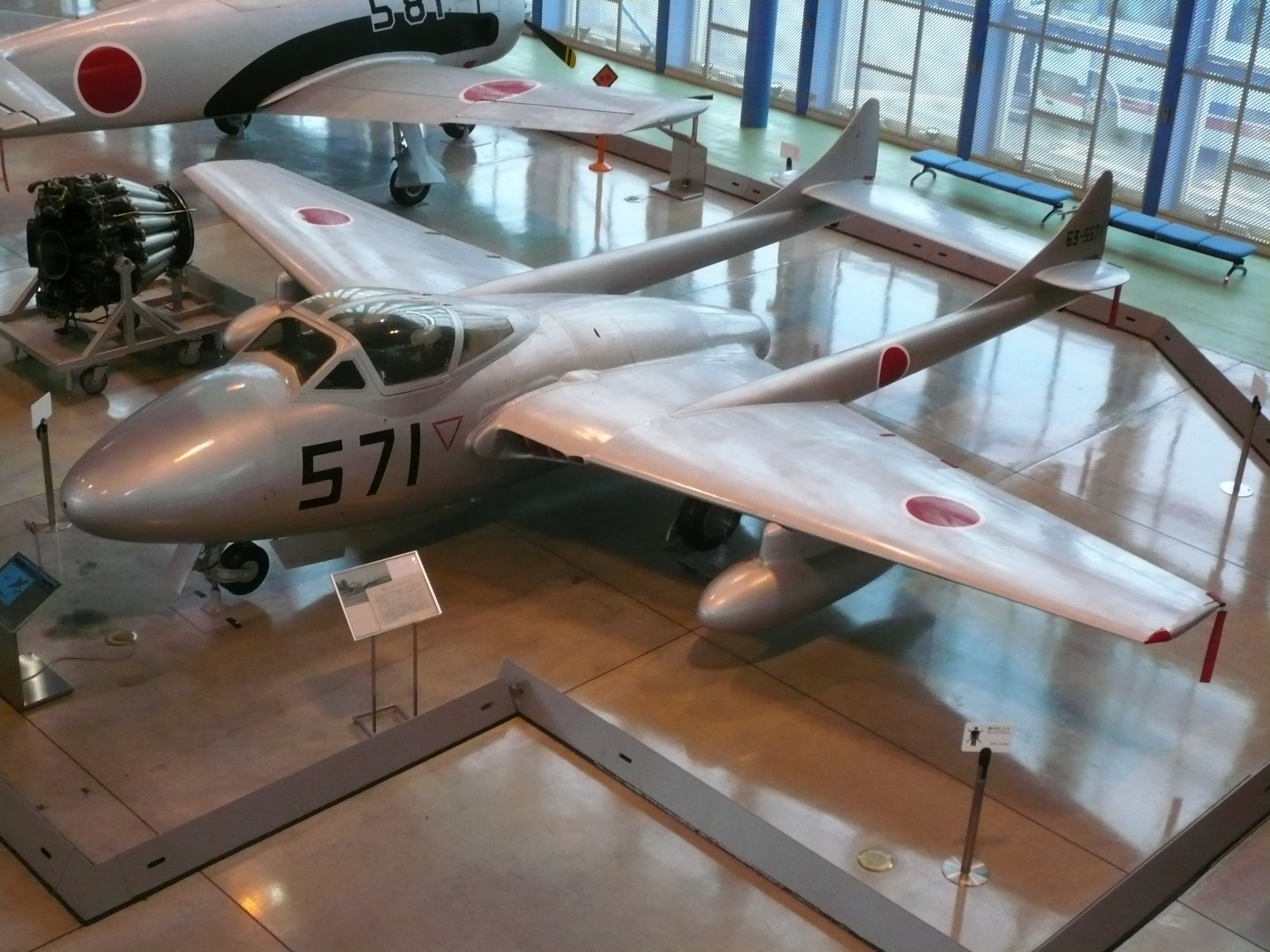
T.55 of Japan Air Self-Defense Force at Hamamatsu Air Base public hall

Australia
Austria
Burma
Canada
Ceylon
Chile
Dominican Republic
Egypt
Finland
France
India
Indonesia
Iraq
Ireland
Italy
Japan
Jordan – nicknamed Abu Tiki (roughly, "Daddy of all whistles") due to noise
Katanga
Lebanon
Mexico -nicknamed Aguacate ("avocado") due to colour and shape.
New Zealand
Norway
Portugal
Rhodesia
Saudi Arabia
South Africa
Sweden
Switzerland
Syria
United Kingdom
Venezuela
Zimbabwe

== Surviving aircraft ==
More than 180 examples survive in 30 countries, with more than seventeen of those in ten countries being airworthy.

A few have been modified for air racing, with four examples making a total of eight appearances at the Reno Air Races so far, winning once.

== Specifications (Vampire FB.6) ==
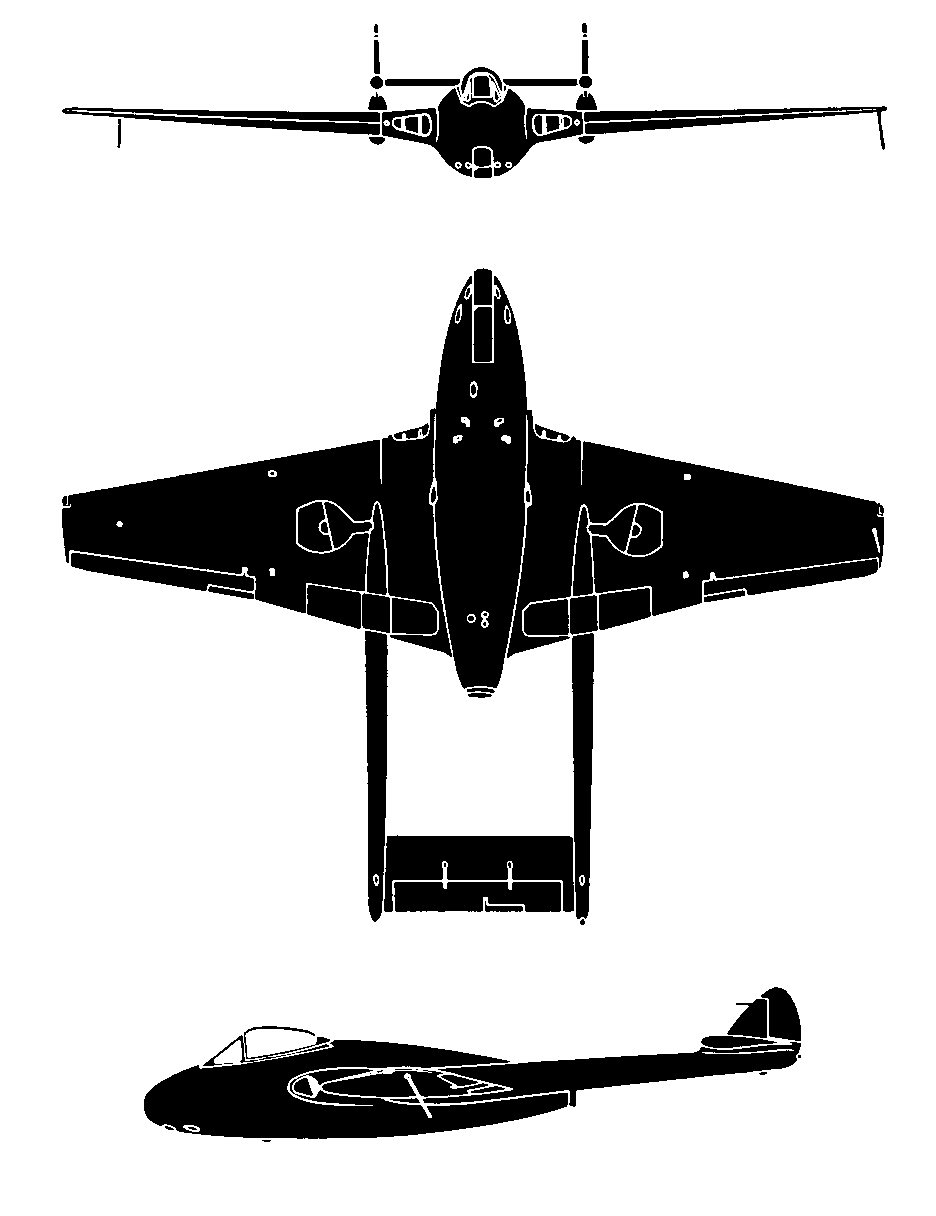
de Havilland Vampire FB.5

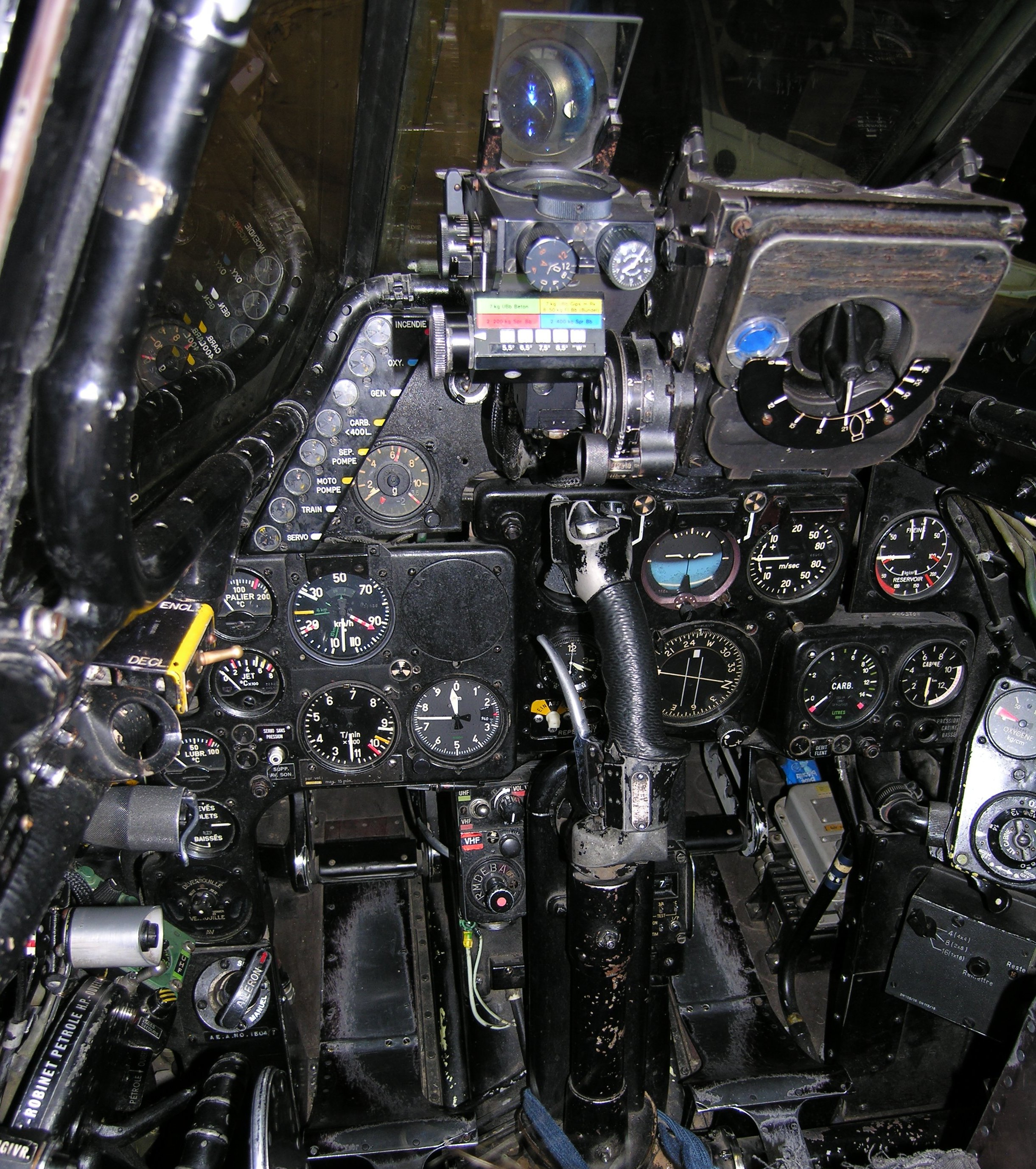
Cockpit layout of the Vampire FB.6

Data from The Illustrated Encyclopedia of Aircraft, The De Havilland Vampire Mk. 5 & 9

General characteristics

- Crew: 1
- Length: 30 ft 9 in (9.37 m)
- Wingspan: 38 ft 0 in (11.58 m)
- Height: 8 ft 10 in (2.69 m)
- Wing area: 262 sq ft (24.3 m^{2})
- Airfoil: root: EC1240/0640 (14%); tip: EC1240/0640 (9%)
- Empty weight: 7,283 lb (3,304 kg)
- Max takeoff weight: 12,390 lb (5,620 kg)
- Powerplant: 1 × de Havilland Goblin 3 centrifugal-flow turbojet engine, 3,350 lbf (14.9 kN) thrust

Performance

- Maximum speed: 548 mph (882 km/h, 476 kn)
- Range: 1,220 mi (1,960 km, 1,060 nmi)
- Service ceiling: 42,800 ft (13,000 m)
- Rate of climb: 4,800 ft/min (24 m/s)
- Wing loading: 39.4 lb/sq ft (192 kg/m^{2})

Armament

- Guns: 4 × 20 mm (0.79 in) Hispano Mk.V cannon with 600 rounds total (150 rounds per gun).
- Rockets: 8 × 3-inch "60 lb" rockets
- Bombs: 2 × 500 lb (225 kg) bombs or two drop-tanks

== See also ==
Related development

- de Havilland Swallow
- de Havilland Venom
- de Havilland Sea Vixen

Aircraft of comparable role, configuration, and era

- Gloster E.1/44 "Gloster Ace" – (United Kingdom)
- Focke-Wulf Flitzer – (Nazi Germany)
- Saab 21R – (Sweden)

Related lists

- List of jet aircraft of World War II
